= Springfield, Anderson County, Texas =

- Unincorporated community
- Location within Texas Location within the United States
- Coordinates: 31°48′19″N 95°28′40″W
- Country: United States
- State: Texas
- County: Anderson
- Elevation: 390 ft (120 m)
- Time zone: UTC-6 (Central (CST))
  - Summer (DST): UTC-5 (CDT)
- Area codes: 430 & 903
- GNIS feature ID: 1380593

Springfield is an unincorporated community in Anderson County, in the U.S. state of Texas. According to the Handbook of Texas, the community had a population of 30 in 2000. It is located within the Palestine, Texas micropolitan area.

== History ==
Springfield was established around 1875. The settlement consisted of a church, only one business, a factory, and several scattered homes along the road in the 1930s. In 1985, it had only one business, a church, and many houses, and became a crossroads community. It had an estimated population of 20 residents from 1939 to 1990 and gained 10 residents in 2000.

== Geography ==
Springfield stands at the juncture of an unnamed country road and Farm to Market Road 837, 2 mi (3.2 km) west of Texas State Highway 19 as well as 19 mi (31 km) northwest of Palestine in the northwestern portion of Anderson County.

== Education ==
Springfield had its own school in the 1930s, which had 163 students enrolled in it during 1932. It then became part of the school in nearby Tennessee Colony in 1955. Today the community is served by the Cayuga Independent School District.
