= Bois d'Arc, Texas =

- Unincorporated community
- Location within Texas Location within the United States
- Coordinates: 31°57′31″N 95°45′11″W
- Country: United States
- State: Texas
- County: Anderson
- Elevation: 459 ft (140 m)
- Time zone: UTC-6 (Central (CST))
  - Summer (DST): UTC-5 (CDT)
- Area codes: 430 & 903
- GNIS feature ID: 2034745

Bois d'Arc is a small unincorporated community in Anderson County, in the U.S. state of Texas. According to the Handbook of Texas, only 10 people lived in Bois d'Arc in 2000. It is a part of the Palestine, Texas micropolitan area.

== History ==
Bois d'Arc had a church, only one business, and several scattered homes along the road. It then became a small crossroads community with only two businesses, a church, and several houses. Only 10 people resided in the settlement in 2000. In the late 1980s, there was a Southern Baptist church, a couple of small stores, and only one house in the community. There was one Osage Orange (Bois d'Arc) tree in that house's backyard. A Baptist church was established in 1914.

== Geography ==
Bois d'Arc stands at the crossroads of Farm to Market Road 860 and Texas State Highway 19, approximately 15 mi (24 km) northwest of Palestine in the northwestern part of Anderson County. There are several houses in the community, with approximately 22 houses within a one-mile radius. There are rolling hills with many varieties of oak, gum, and pine trees. There are only two known Bois d'Arc trees left in the community.

== Demographics ==
The Baptist Church has a membership of over 300, with an average attendance of 90–100. Mostly Anglo residents live in the community, but there are a few Hispanic families as well. The locals raise cattle, horses, and goats.

== Education ==
Bois d'Arc had a school in the 1930s and enrolled 45 students in 1932. It was consolidated with the school in Montalba in 1955. Today the community is served by the Cayuga Independent School District.
