= Bradford, Texas =

- Unincorporated community
- Location within Texas Location within the United States
- Coordinates: 31°59′20″N 95°46′00″W
- Country: United States
- State: Texas
- County: Anderson
- Elevation: 423 ft (129 m)
- Time zone: UTC-6 (Central (CST))
  - Summer (DST): UTC-5 (CDT)
- Area codes: 430 & 903
- GNIS feature ID: 1379452

Bradford is an unincorporated community in Anderson County, located in the U.S. state of Texas. According to the Handbook of Texas, the community had a population of 30 in 2000. It is located within the Palestine, Texas micropolitan area.

== History ==
Bradford was first settled around 1879. A post office was established at Bradford in 1882 and remained in operation until 1907. It is thought to be named for B.L. Bradford, the community's first postmaster. A Presbyterian church, a general store, and steam-powered cotton gins and gristmills were in the settlement in 1884 and had a population of 150 inhabitants. In 1896, the settlement reached its population zenith of 200 and brothers J.B. and D.D. Hanks established a sawmill and gin in the early 1900s. It began to fade soon afterward. It had 125 inhabitants in 1900, which then plunged to about 20 settlers by 1933. There was a factory, another unknown business, and an unknown number of homes scattered along the road in the 1930s. The population increased to 50 in the mid-1940s. It lost half of its population by 1949 and it only had 22 residents from 1974 to 1990. It had a business, a cemetery, and several homes in 1985. It had 30 inhabitants in 2000. The town's only business, Bradford Cafe, formerly Walls General Store, burned to the ground on September 18, 2017.

== Geography ==
Bradford stands at the junction of Farm to Market Road 837 and Texas State Highway 19, 18 mi (29 km) northwest of Palestine in northwestern Anderson County.

== Education ==
Bradford had its own school in 1884. Today the community is served by the Cayuga Independent School District.

== Notable person ==
- Kolby Cooper, country music singer-songwriter
