= Bethel, Anderson County, Texas =

Bethel, Texas
- Unincorporated community
- Location within Texas Location within the United States
- Coordinates: 31°55′13″N 95°55′13″W
- Country: United States
- State: Texas
- County: Anderson
- Elevation: 371 ft (113 m)
- Time zone: UTC-6 (Central (CST))
  - Summer (DST): UTC-5 (CDT)
- Area codes: 430 & 903
- GNIS feature ID: 1379413

Bethel is an unincorporated community in Anderson County, located in the U.S. state of Texas. According to the Handbook of Texas, 50 people lived in the community in 2000. It is a part of the Palestine, Texas micropolitan area.

== History ==
Bethel lies on the upper northeast edge of the land originally granted to José de Jesús Grande on December 17, 1833. Although he agreed in his grant application to attract colonists to cultivate the land, little settlement occurred until after hostilities with the native tribes died down in the mid-1840s.

Early settlers were situated around the land of Charles Gilmore (1796–1880) whose house served as the first polling place, school, and church. He donated part of his land to build the chapel and cemetery of Gilmore's Chapel Methodist Church (now called Gilmore's Chapel Cemetery). By 1852, the community had a general store, a blacksmith shop and post office with Charles Gilmore as postmaster. In 1854, the Baptist congregation in northern Anderson County split into an eastern group and a western group who wanted a church closer to their homes. They began the Judson Baptist Church at an arbor near Gilmore's home. They built the first Judson church building and cemetery (now called Old Judson Cemetery or just "lost cemetery") nearby but moved Judson Church closer to Cayuga after the War. The 1860 federal census recorded 300 inhabitants.

Bethel church and cemetery were erected on land donated by Henry Rampy south of Gilmore's land on July 13, 1859. Rampy, who had come in 1848, intended the property to be used equally by the Baptists, Methodists, and Cumberland Presbyterians. The church was used for about forty years, after which it was abandoned, and the building was torn down. The church cemetery was still in use in 1990, maintained by a voluntary association including descendants of the original grantor. For many years the cemetery was marked by a grove of huge cedar trees. Local legend says that during the Civil War the Confederacy had a campground near the cemetery. Soldiers who died were buried without grave markers. Instead, the cedar trees were planted so that after the war people could return and place markers. Two more Bethel churches (sometimes referred to as Old Bethel Church and New Bethel Church) were constructed further south.

The economy of the area has always been largely agricultural. The post office was discontinued in 1914. During the Great Depression of the 1930s, the population dropped to thirty. After World War II there was a slight increase during the time of major oil discoveries, in which it had 90 occupants. It had 30 inhabitants from the 1970s to 1990. The cemetery is still in the community to this day. As of 2000, the population was fifty people.

== Geography ==
Bethel sits along U.S. Highway 287, 8 mi (13 km) southeast of the Trinity River in the northwestern part of Anderson County. It is also located 21 mi (34 km) northwest of Palestine.

== Education ==
Bethel had a school district until it was consolidated with the Cayuga Independent School District in the 1950s. In 1990, the facilities of the Cayuga ISD were the only buildings that remained in the community. It is still currently served by the Cayuga ISD today.
