= Wells Creek, Texas =

- Unincorporated community
- Location within Texas Location within the United States
- Coordinates: 31°47′54″N 95°33′19″W
- Country: United States
- State: Texas
- County: Anderson
- Elevation: 440 ft (130 m)
- Time zone: UTC-6 (Central (CST))
  - Summer (DST): UTC-5 (CDT)
- Area codes: 430 & 903
- GNIS feature ID: 1380753

Wells Creek is an unincorporated community in Anderson County, located in the U.S. state of Texas. It is located within the Palestine, Texas micropolitan area.

== History ==
Wells Creek is named for the nearby Wells Creek, which was also named for Samuel G. Wells, who was issued a grant for the land on which the community and a majority of the creek are located today. It had a flag stop station and several scattered houses in the 1930s, and only one home was located in the community in 1982.

== Geography ==
Wells Creek sits on Farm to Market Road 3266, along the Missouri Pacific Railroad and near Wells Creek, 4 mi (6.4 km) east of Palestine in the eastern portion of Anderson County.

== Education ==
Public education in Wells Creek is provided by the Palestine Independent School District.
