= Yard, Texas =

- Unincorporated community
- Location within Texas Location within the United States
- Coordinates: 31°51′55″N 95°58′01″W
- Country: United States
- State: Texas
- County: Anderson
- Elevation: 371 ft (113 m)
- Time zone: UTC-6 (Central (CST))
  - Summer (DST): UTC-5 (CDT)
- Area codes: 430 & 903
- GNIS feature ID: 1372012

Yard is an unincorporated community in Anderson County, in the U.S. state of Texas. According to the Handbook of Texas, the community had a population of 18 in 2000. It is located within the Palestine, Texas micropolitan area.

== History ==
The community was named Yard after they accidentally sent a customer's fabric order to the post office department, alongside a list of actual name. The Yard post office, established in 1903, shut down in the 1950s.

== Geography ==
Yard stands on Farm to Market Road 321, adjacent to the Trinity River, 20 mi (32 km) northwest of Palestine in the northwestern portion of Anderson County.

== Education ==
Public education in Yard is provided by the Cayuga Independent School District.
