= Cayuga, Texas =

- Unincorporated community
- Location within the state of Texas Cayuga, Texas (the United States)
- Coordinates: 31°57′26″N 95°58′29″W
- Country: United States
- State: Texas
- County: Anderson
- Elevation: 308 ft (94 m)
- Time zone: UTC-6 (Central (CST))
  - Summer (DST): UTC-5 (CDT)
- ZIP codes: 75832
- Area codes: 430 & 903
- GNIS feature ID: 1379518

Cayuga is an unincorporated community in northwestern Anderson County, Texas, United States. According to the Handbook of Texas, the community had a population of 200 in 2000. It is located within the Palestine, Texas micropolitan area.

== History ==
Cayuga was so named in 1894 by the first postmaster, William Alonzo Davenport, after his native Cayuga, New York. The community began to grow in the 1880s, gathering people and resources from the earlier communities: Gilmore's Chapel, Wild Cat Bluff and Bethel, all settled in the late 1840s and early 1850s.

In 1854, the Judson Baptist Church began at an arbor near Charles Gilmore's home. There the settlers established the first Methodist Church in the northwestern part of Anderson County, and later Judson Baptist Church, in a brush arbor, and a cemetery (originally, Gilmore's Chapel Cemetery, now abandoned but called Old Judson Cemetery or just "lost cemetery"). Judson Church moved to the location of the Judson Cemetery soon thereafter. In 1911 it moved to a site on land donated by H. S. Clay in 1911, and later to its present location. The Joppa Holiness Church served Cayuga from 1899 to 1907, and the Freeman Baptist Church held regular services from 1910 to 1934.

Cayuga remained a small farming community until 1934 when the Tidewater Oil Company discovered oil in a new field; the Discovery Well was the J.N. Edens No. 1. That discovery caused Cayuga to become an oil boomtown overnight. By 1936, it had over 1,000 residents and 15 businesses. It began to go away after World War II, and the community's population plunged to 200 by 1952. It plunged again to 56 residents by 1974, and only two businesses were located in the community. The community was revived when the Richland-Chambers Creek Reservoir was discovered in nearby Freestone and Navarro counties and when four state prisons were established in the area. Large lignite reserves were discovered in the area not long after. Approximately 700 people lived in Cayuga in 1988 and there were several businesses, which included offices of two major petroleum companies in the area. The population plunged to a paltry 56 in 1990 and grew to 200 in 2000.

Cayuga has a post office with the ZIP code 75832.

== Geography ==
Cayuga sits along the junction of U.S. Highway 287 and Farm to Market Road 59, 5 mi (8.0 km) east of the Trinity River in northwestern Anderson County. Nearby cities include Palestine, located 27 mi (43 km) southwest; Corsicana, located 32 mi (51 km) west; and Athens, located 20 mi (32 km) north.

== Education ==
The first school in the area started at the home of Charles Gilmore and was taught by George W. Tuggle, who also served as chief justice of Anderson County. He and his wife, Elizabeth Tuggle, gave a half-acre of their land near Tuggle Springs in the Bethel area for the first schoolhouse on May 7, 1860. It remained until it was moved to the Cayuga-Blackfoot road in the 1880s. It was moved to an unknown location just off Farm to Market Road 59 in 1922, following an argument. In 1974, the school was relocated to Bethel, Texas. Today, the community is served by the Cayuga Independent School District.

== Notable person ==
- Shelby Metcalf, who spent a year as the head basketball coach at Cayuga High School.
