= Elmwood, Texas =

- Unincorporated community
- Location within Texas Location within the United States
- Coordinates: 31°55′11″N 95°37′52″W
- Country: United States
- State: Texas
- County: Anderson
- Elevation: 620 ft (190 m)
- Time zone: UTC-6 (Central (CST))
  - Summer (DST): UTC-5 (CDT)
- Area codes: 430 & 903
- GNIS feature ID: 1379720

Elmwood is an unincorporated community in Anderson County, located in the U.S. state of Texas. According to the Handbook of Texas, the community had a population of 25 in 2000. It is located within the Palestine, Texas micropolitan area.

== History ==
Elmwood was first settled in the 1850s. It was then named for the elm trees in the area in 1881. The community was recognized by the Anderson County Herald for having a literary society and debating and meeting every two weeks. It applied for a post office that year, but it was unsuccessful. There were two stores and a barbershop operating in Elmwood in the 1920s. It had only one business and ten inhabitants in 1933. The community's farms produced mostly cotton, poultry, and dairy products. It had 20 residents from 1952 to 1987 and had a church in 1985. The population was 25 in 2000.

== Geography ==
Elmwood sits at the juncture of county road 441 and Farm to Market Road 315, 11 mi (18 km) northeast of Palestine in northeastern Anderson County.

== Education ==
Elmwood had its own school in 1932 and had 56 white students and 112 African American students enrolled in it. Today the community is served by the Palestine Independent School District.
