= Salmon, Texas =

- Unincorporated community
- Location within Texas Location within the United States
- Coordinates: 31°34′23″N 95°29′54″W
- Country: United States
- State: Texas
- County: Anderson
- Elevation: 509 ft (155 m)
- Time zone: UTC-6 (Central (CST))
  - Summer (DST): UTC-5 (CDT)
- Area codes: 430 & 903
- GNIS feature ID: 1367369

Salmon is an unincorporated community in Anderson County, Texas, United States. According to the Handbook of Texas, it had a population of 20 in 2000. It is located within the Palestine, Texas micropolitan area.

== History ==
Salmon was founded after the nearby town of Elkhart grew out of its incorporated area, taking the name Bryon Switch. The town was renamed Salmon after the postmaster, Meredith D. Salmon, built a post office inside a general store. In 1914, the community comprised three general stores, a cotton gin, and a sawmill. It had telephone service and a population of 100 that same year. It had numerous population estimates, with 10 residents in both 1925 and 1933, and 100 in 1927 and 1929. It then had 80 occupants in 1939, as well as a church, four businesses, and a few scattered houses. The post office remained open until the mid-1950s so the residents of the Salmon community must receive mail through the postmaster in Elkhart. In 1956, the community's population shrunk to a paltry 25 residents, and no businesses were reported. It did jump back to 100 residents by 1964. It then plunged to 20 in 1970 and remained at that level in 2000. As of 1980, the town comprises a single church, one business, and a few houses. To help preserve the history of the town, a replica post office and general store was built in 2002 by a descendant of Meredith D. Salmon, the community's first postmaster.

== Geography ==
Salmon sits along the Missouri Pacific line, U.S. Highway 287, and Texas State Highway 19, 14 mi (23 km) southeast of Palestine in southern Anderson County.

== Education ==
The Elkhart Independent School District serves the residents of Salmon.
