= Massey Lake, Texas =

- Unincorporated community
- Location within Texas Location within the United States
- Coordinates: 31°48′44″N 95°52′06″W
- Country: United States
- State: Texas
- County: Anderson
- Elevation: 289 ft (88 m)
- Time zone: UTC-6 (Central (CST))
  - Summer (DST): UTC-5 (CDT)
- Area codes: 430 & 903
- GNIS feature ID: 1378648

Massey Lake is an unincorporated community in Anderson County, located within the U.S. state of Texas. It is located within the Palestine, Texas micropolitan area.

== Geography ==
Massey Lake stands along Farm to Market Road 2054, 14 mi (23 km) northwest of Palestine and 2 mi (3.2 km) southwest of Tennessee Colony in the western part of Anderson County.

== Demographics ==
Massey Lake is estimated to have a population of 20, and according to the Texas Almanac, has remained at around 20 people between 1925 and 1966, the last year in which data was collected. In the 2020 census, Massey Lake and its zip code were part of a mostly-middle aged census grouping of just under 10,000 people.

== Education ==
Massey Lake had three schools, with two during the 1930s and 1940s and only one in 1985. Today the community is served by the Cayuga Independent School District.
