= Swanson Hill Church, Texas =

- Unincorporated community
- Location within Texas Location within the United States
- Coordinates: 31°44′12″N 95°32′34″W
- Country: United States
- State: Texas
- County: Anderson
- Elevation: 381 ft (116 m)
- Time zone: UTC-6 (Central (CST))
  - Summer (DST): UTC-5 (CDT)
- Area codes: 430 & 903
- GNIS feature ID: 1379644

Swanson Hill Church, formerly known as Deanwright, is an unincorporated community in Anderson County, in the U.S. state of Texas. It is located within the Palestine, Texas micropolitan area.

== History ==
The community was named Deanwright in the 1930s and had several homes and a church located on-site. H.C. Swanson was an early settler in the community. Its name was changed to Swanson Hill Church in 1982 and it had a church and several scattered houses. The church was still standing in 1985 and the community could not be located on the county highway map in 2000.

== Geography ==
Swanson Hill Church stands along Farm to Market Road 323, 4 mi (6.4 km) southeast of Palestine in central Anderson County.

== Education ==
A school called Swanson Hill School was established in the community in the 1930s. It was thought to be named for H.C. Swanson and had an enrollment of 88 White students in 1932. It then consolidated with the Palestine Independent School District in 1955. The community continues to be served by the Palestine ISD to this day.
