= Long Lake, Texas =

- Unincorporated community
- Location within Texas Location within the United States
- Coordinates: 31°38′59″N 95°46′52″W
- Country: United States
- State: Texas
- County: Anderson
- Elevation: 236 ft (72 m)
- Time zone: UTC-6 (Central (CST))
  - Summer (DST): UTC-5 (CDT)
- Area codes: 430 & 903
- GNIS feature ID: 1361751

Long Lake is an unincorporated community in Anderson County, in the U.S. state of Texas. It is located within the Palestine, Texas micropolitan area.

== Geography ==
Long Lake sits along the Union Pacific line, U.S. Routes 79 and 84 along the Trinity River, 11 mi (18 km) southwest of Palestine in southwestern Anderson County.

== Education ==
Long Lake had its own school in 1939, as well as a school called Green Bay High School in 1982. Today, the community is served by the Westwood Independent School District.
