= Crystal Lake, Texas =

- Unincorporated community
- Location within Texas Location within the United States
- Coordinates: 31°41′23″N 95°30′19″W
- Country: United States
- State: Texas
- County: Anderson
- Elevation: 331 ft (101 m)
- Time zone: UTC-6 (Central (CST))
  - Summer (DST): UTC-5 (CDT)
- Area codes: 430 & 903
- GNIS feature ID: 2034804

Crystal Lake is an unincorporated community in Anderson County, located in the U.S. state of Texas. According to the Handbook of Texas, the community had a population of 20 in 2000. It is located within the Palestine, Texas micropolitan area.

== History ==
Crystal Lake had several homes and a golf course in the 1930s. A church called Antioch Church and several scattered homes were located in the community in 1982 and only one business was reported in the community in 1985. It had a population of 20 in 2000.

== Geography ==
Crystal Lake stands along U.S. Highway 84 and the Texas State Railroad, 8 mi (13 km) east of Palestine in eastern Anderson County. It stands near a lake with the same name.

== Economy ==
Crystal Lake is a church and recreation community with fishing and camping facilities that are used by the Crystal Lake Country Club.

== Education ==
Crystal Lake had a school that belonged to the Swanson Spring school district in the 1930s. It served 49 students in 1932 and was then consolidated with the Palestine Independent School District in 1955. Today, the community is served by the Slocum Independent School District.
