= Cayuga High School =

Location
- 17750 N US287; Cayuga, Anderson County, Texas 75832-0427; United States; 31.922313°N 95.923772°W

Information
- School type: Public, high school
- Locale: Rural: Remote
- School district: Cayuga ISD
- NCES School ID: 481320000821
- Principal: Russell Holden
- Teaching staff: 17.72 (on an FTE basis)
- Grades: 9–12
- Enrollment: 187 (2023–2024)
- Student to teacher ratio: 10.55
- Colors: Black and Gold
- Athletics conference: UIL Class AA
- Mascot: Wildcat/Ladycat
- Website: Cayuga High School

Cayuga High School is a public high school located in Cayuga, Texas. It is part of the Cayuga Independent School District located in northwestern Anderson County and classified as a 2A school by the UIL. During 2023-2024, Cayuga High School had an enrollment of 187 students and a student to teacher ratio of 10.55. The school received an A from the Texas Education Agency for the 2024–2025 school year.

== Athletics ==
The Cayuga Wildcats compete in the following sports

- Baseball
- Basketball
- Cross Country
- Football
- Golf
- Softball
- Tennis
- Track and Field
- Volleyball

=== State Titles ===
- Boys Basketball
  - 1951(1A), 1953(1A), 1954(1A), 2010(1A/D1)
- Football
  - 2009(1A/D2)
- Girls Track
  - 1985(1A), 1986(1A)

=== 2010 State Champions (Basketball) ===
Season Info

- Record 22-2
- 11 100-point games
- 10 consecutive 100-point games
- 6 Seniors
- 89.6 PPG

Coaches:
Head Coach: Greg Jenkins
Assistant Coaches: Russell Holden, Carl Ivins, Greg Branch

- Patrick Boxie #0
- Billy Duncan #1
- Sha’keal Jenkins #2
- D’onte Jackson #3
- Malcome Kennedy #4
- Chris Turner #5
- Hunter Jenkins #10
- Traylon Shead #15
- Josiah Summerville #20
- Preston Anderson #21
- CJ Wagner #22
- Caleb Summerville #23
- Don Holly #32
- Dalevin Campbell #33
- Zac Bowman #44
- Melvin Shead #52
- Deon Shofner #55

=== Traylon Shead ===
Traylon Shead (graduate of 2010) committed to play running back at the University of Texas. Shead is the all-time touchdown leader in Texas High School Football History. Shead is also number 2 in rushing yards behind "The Sugar Land Express" Kenneth Hall
