= Elmtown, Texas =

- Unincorporated community
- Location within Texas Location within the United States
- Coordinates: 31°53′46″N 95°37′43″W
- Country: United States
- State: Texas
- County: Anderson
- Elevation: 489 ft (149 m)
- Time zone: UTC-6 (Central (CST))
  - Summer (DST): UTC-5 (CDT)
- Area codes: 430 & 903
- GNIS feature ID: 1379719

Elmtown is an unincorporated community in Anderson County, located in the U.S. state of Texas. It is located within the Palestine, Texas micropolitan area.

== History ==
This community was named for the elm trees that lined the nearby Mound Prairie creek. A post office was established at Elmtown in 1901 and remained in operation until 1906. It had only two businesses and ten settlers in 1933 and not long after, its population was estimated as 50 in the late 1930s. A factory was in operation in the 1940s and all that remained in the 1980s was a cemetery located at the crossroads. It was still listed on county highway maps to refer to the community's extension at that same time.

== Geography ==
Elmtown stands at the junction of an unnamed county road and Farm to Market Road 315, 9 mi (14 km) north of Palestine in northern Anderson County.

== Education ==
Today Elmtown is served by the Palestine Independent School District.
