= Fosterville, Texas =

- Unincorporated community
- Location within Texas Location within the United States
- Coordinates: 32°00′39″N 95°36′53″W
- Country: United States
- State: Texas
- County: Anderson
- Elevation: 427 ft (130 m)
- Time zone: UTC-6 (Central (CST))
  - Summer (DST): UTC-5 (CDT)
- Area codes: 430 & 903
- GNIS feature ID: 1378317

Fosterville is an unincorporated community in Anderson County, located in the U.S. state of Texas. It is located within the Palestine, Texas micropolitan area.

== History ==
A post office was established at Fosterville in 1870 and remained in operation until 1907. The community itself was founded sometime before 1870 when the post office was established. It had an estimated 70 inhabitants in 1884. There were Baptist, Colored Baptist, and Christian churches, four blacksmith shops, two water-powered cotton gins and sawmills, two doctors, and a general store located in the settlement that same year. It had an estimated 40 residents in 1890 and gained ten more inhabitants six years later. It had a sawmill and numerous homes by the 1930s. The community did not have its name shown on the 1985 county highway map, but did have one business in operation that year. A cemetery was located in the community in 2000, even though it was unable to be located on that map.

== Geography ==
Fosterville stands at the junction of Hilton Tap Road and Farm to Market Road 315 near Indian Creek, 17 mi (27 km) northeast of Palestine in northeastern Anderson County.

== Education ==
Fosterville had its own school in 1884 and it disappeared by the 1930s. Today the community is served by the Frankston Independent School District.
