= Keith Crawford =

American football player (born 1970)

No. 85, 45, 20, 81, 41, 86
- Positions: Wide receiver, cornerback

Personal information
- Born: November 21, 1970 (age 55); Palestine, Texas, U.S.
- Listed height: 6 ft 2 in (1.88 m)
- Listed weight: 188 lb (85 kg)

Career information
- High school: Westwood
- College: Howard Payne
- NFL draft: 1993: undrafted

Career history
- New York Giants (1993); Green Bay Packers (1994–1995); St. Louis Rams (1996–1997); Atlanta Falcons (1998)*; Kansas City Chiefs (1998); Green Bay Packers (1999); Memphis Maniax (2001)
- * Offseason or practice squad member only

Career NFL statistics
- Receptions: 13
- Receiving yards: 252
- Tackles: 26
- Stats at Pro Football Reference

Keith LaCharles Crawford (born November 21, 1970, in Palestine, Texas) is a former cornerback in the National Football League.

== Career ==
Crawford spent his first season in the NFL with the New York Giants. After a year away from the NFL, he joined the Green Bay Packers for the 1995 NFL season. He then spent the next two seasons with the St. Louis Rams and a season with the Kansas City Chiefs. In his final season in the NFL, he returned to the Packers. He also played for the Memphis Maniax of the XFL.

He played at the collegiate level at Howard Payne University.
