= Jarvis, Texas =

- Ghost town
- Location within Texas Location within the United States
- Coordinates: 31°45′19″N 95°26′42″W
- Country: United States
- State: Texas
- County: Anderson
- Elevation: 299 ft (91 m)
- Time zone: UTC-6 (Central (CST))
  - Summer (DST): UTC-5 (CDT)
- Area codes: 430 & 903
- GNIS feature ID: 1379998

Jarvis is a ghost town in Anderson County, in the U.S. state of Texas. It is a part of the Palestine, Texas micropolitan area. Although it is considered a ghost town by the Handbook of Texas, the Geographic Names Information System classifies it as an unincorporated community.

== History ==
An unsuccessful oil-drilling operation occurred in the area in 1909. In the 1930s, the community had a few homes, two churches, and only one operating business. Then the 1982 county highway map showed a few scattered houses in Jarvis, while a church named Fields Chapel was located a half mile north of the area along U.S. Highway 84. The community has never been listed on county highway maps since 1985, but the church was still in operation.

== Geography ==
Jarvis stood along the Texas State Railroad at the junction of two county roads and just south of U.S. Highway 84, about 10 mi (16 km) east of Palestine in the southeastern portion of Anderson County.

== See also ==
- Wild Cat Bluff, Texas
