= Tucker, Texas =

- Unincorporated community
- Location within Texas Location within the United States
- Coordinates: 31°40′25″N 95°44′53″W
- Country: United States
- State: Texas
- County: Anderson
- Elevation: 292 ft (89 m)
- Time zone: UTC-6 (Central (CST))
  - Summer (DST): UTC-5 (CDT)
- Area codes: 430 & 903
- GNIS feature ID: 1370179

Tucker is an unincorporated community in Anderson County, located within the U.S. state of Texas. According to the Handbook of Texas, the community had a population of 304 in 2000. It is located within the Palestine, Texas micropolitan area.

== Geography ==
Tucker sits approximately 2 mi (3.2 km) away from the Trinity River, as well as along the intersection of U.S. Highways 79 and 84 on the Missouri Pacific Railroad, 8 mi (13 km) southwest of Palestine in the southwestern portion of Anderson County.

== Education ==
A school called Green Bay was located in the community for the settlement's African American students and, as of 1884, there was a school for white students. The community continues to be served by the Westwood ISD to this day.
