= Todd City, Texas =

- Unincorporated community
- Location within Texas Location within the United States
- Coordinates: 31°55′13″N 95°55′13″W
- Country: United States
- State: Texas
- County: Anderson
- Elevation: 375 ft (114 m)
- Time zone: UTC-6 (Central (CST))
  - Summer (DST): UTC-5 (CDT)
- Area codes: 903, 430
- GNIS feature ID: 1380667

Todd City is an unincorporated community in Anderson County, in the U.S. state of Texas. According to the Handbook of Texas, only 10 people lived in the community in 2000. It is located within the Palestine, Texas micropolitan area.

== Geography ==
Todd City sits at the juncture of Farm to Market Road 19 and an unknown country road, 3 mi (4.8 km) west of the Neches River, as well as some 14 mi (23 km) northeast of Palestine in the northeastern portion of Anderson County.

== Education ==
Todd City is served by the Neches Independent School District.
