= Cronin, Texas =

- Unincorporated community
- Location within Texas Location within the United States
- Coordinates: 31°40′35″N 95°37′00″W
- Country: United States
- State: Texas
- County: Anderson
- Elevation: 299 ft (91 m)
- Time zone: UTC-6 (Central (CST))
  - Summer (DST): UTC-5 (CDT)
- Area codes: 430 & 903
- GNIS feature ID: 1379607

Cronin is an unincorporated community in Anderson County, located in the U.S. state of Texas. Cronin is 290 feet above sea level. It is a part of the Palestine, Texas micropolitan area.
