= Blackfoot, Texas =

- Unincorporated community
- Location within Texas Location within the United States
- Coordinates: 31°56′47″N 95°50′07″W
- Country: United States
- State: Texas
- County: Anderson
- Elevation: 390 ft (120 m)
- Time zone: UTC-6 (Central (CST))
  - Summer (DST): UTC-5 (CDT)
- Area codes: 430 & 903
- GNIS feature ID: 1379426

Blackfoot is an unincorporated community in Anderson County, located in the U.S. state of Texas. According to the Handbook of Texas, 33 people lived in the community in 2000. It is a part of the Palestine, Texas micropolitan area.

== History ==
A Primitive Baptist church was located in Blackfoot and was preached by a family member of a resident named Cynthia Ann Parker. The community's first settlers came from South Carolina and Mississippi and included Isaac Brown, Abe Hoff, and D.M. Crisp. The community was supposedly named when Uncle Hamp Hanks Sr., was told that he was in the "Blackfoot nation" when he arrived there in 1870. Friendship Baptist Church was the oldest church in the community, established in 1860. It stood on the line between Ward and Blackfoot. A man named Josh Taylor donated land to the community to build a First Christian church there in 1890, but one was already established a few years earlier. A post office was established at Blackfoot in 1886 and remained in operation until 1907. William U. Stafford was the postmaster and mail was then routed through Montalba after the post office's closure in 1907. The most common agriculture raised in Blackfoot were hogs, corn, cattle, and cotton. The community's first cotton gin was built around 1880 and both Obe Childress and A.M. Kay operated it for over 60 years. The community then received electricity in 1941 when the REA New Area Co-op was established, and it eventually received telephone service in 1959. A field was uncovered in the area during a strike in the East Texas Oil Field in 1930 and had wells that continued to produce oil in the late 1950s. In 1935, a justice of the peace courthouse was established in the settlement and was used for precinct court at the start of the 20th century. This building stood on the Isabell farm until a windstorm blew it down in 1973. Before the Civil War, a total of 40 people lived in Blackfoot. It then decreased to 30 in 1896 and increased dramatically to 200 by 1936. The Friendship Baptist Church, a cemetery, and two dairies were located in Blackfoot in 1988. Its population in both 1990 and 2000 was 33.

== Geography ==
Blackfoot is located 20 miles northwest of Palestine on Farm to Market Road 860 in the northwestern portion of Anderson County.

== Education ==
Before the Civil War, Blackfoot had a school named The Stillhouse School, and the teacher's name was Mrs. Eilding. Later, in 1942, a two-room school, called the Isabel school, was consolidated with the now-defunct Ward-Blackfoot-Springfield Independent School District. Today the community is served by the Cayuga Independent School District.
