= 2015 Texas campsite shooting =

Mass shooting in Texas, US

- Location: Anderson County, Texas, US
- Date: November 15, 2015
- Attack type: Murders and mass shooting
- Weapons: .22 caliber revolver and .45 caliber revolver
- Deaths: Carl Johnson, 77; Thomas Kamp, 45; Hannah Johnson, 40; Nathan Kamp, 23; Austin Kamp, 21; Kade Johnson, 6
- Perpetrators: William Mitchell Hudson, 33
- Verdict: Guilty of capital murder; sentenced to death in 2017
- Convictions: Capital murder (three counts)

On November 15, 2015, near Palestine, Texas, United States, 33-year-old William Mitchell Hudson (born July 3, 1982) fatally shot six members of a family who were camping at a local campsite. Armed with both a .22-caliber and a .45-caliber revolver, Hudson reportedly committed the murders because he was unhappy about losing his family's land, which was sold to one of the victims. Hudson was arrested, charged, and found guilty of capital murder, and consequently sentenced to death on November 15, 2017.

== Shootings ==
Seven members of an extended family set up their camp at the campsite near Palestine, Texas, on the day of the shooting. The seven campers were 45-year-old Thomas "Tom" Kamp and his 40-year-old girlfriend Hannah Johnson; Hannah Johnson's parents, 77-year-old Carl Johnson and 73-year-old Cynthia Johnson; Thomas Kamp's two adult sons, 23-year-old Nathan Kamp and 21-year-old Austin Kamp; and Hannah's six-year-old son Kade Johnson. Thomas, who had two more sons with the birth mother of Austin and Nathan before they divorced, bought the campsite not long before, prior to the camping trip, and he invited both the brothers from California (where they lived with their mother and two other brothers) to camp with him and the other four to celebrate Nathan's upcoming 24th birthday. The campsite was the same land that originally belonged to the family of 33-year-old William Mitchell Hudson, who was reportedly resentful and aggrieved at losing his family's land due to his inability to buy it.

While the seven were camping, Hudson approached the group to befriend them, and helped them to dislodge their truck and trailer as they got stuck in the mud. Hudson also joined the group for some drinks, although at one point, he was upset with the group for cutting the padlock off the property prior to setting camp. Later on, Hudson left the area to collect more firewood together with Thomas, Austin, Nathan, and Kade, while Carl, Cynthia, and Hannah remained there to prepare dinner. The prosecution's contention was that that due to his anger and resentment for losing the land that his family owned for generations before it was sold, Hudson shot the victims with a .22-caliber and a .45-caliber revolver, killing six of them in the process. Hudson first killed Kade, Thomas, Nathan, and Austin and left their bodies at a stock pond behind his residence near the campsite, before he alone returned to the campsite to shoot the remaining three campers. Among the trio, Carl and Hannah died from the shooting. Autopsy results showed that all the six deceased victims died from gunshot wounds and extreme blunt-force trauma.

Cynthia, the sole survivor of the seven victims, managed to stay alive by hiding herself from Hudson, until she found conditions safe enough to come out and call the police. Investigators searched the area, and as they got near to Hudson's home, they discovered a tractor with bloodstains, and they approached Hudson's house. Although Hudson barricaded himself inside, he eventually chose to give up and he was then arrested.

== Charges ==
On November 19, 2015, Hudson was charged with six counts of capital murder, an offense that carries either the death penalty or life imprisonment without the possibility of parole.

On February 25, 2016, Hudson was formally indicted by a jury for three counts of capital murder. The Anderson County district attorney was expected to pursue the death penalty for Hudson, who pleaded not guilty to the charges.

In January 2017, Hudson's trial was to be moved from Anderson County to another location, due to pretrial publicity. In February 2017, the trial was confirmed to be conducted in Brazos County, and a preliminary trial date was set for September 25, 2017.

== Background of the shooter ==
William Mitchell Hudson was born in Anderson County, Texas, on July 3, 1982. Hudson, who had a sister, dropped out of school at age 17 after his junior year. He went on to complete his general education development test and obtain a high-school diploma and later took up a job at a bus maintenance barn at the Palestine Independent School District for a few years. Former high school classmates of Hudson's recalled him as an athletic student who played tennis and basketball, and was fond of hunting whitetail deer with his father and friends in the pine forests of East Texas.

When Hudson was 17, he was arrested for family violence after he threatened to kill his father and himself. On another occasion, Hudson was arrested for assault after he tailed a man to a local gas station in East Texas and threatened to kill him, and a gun fell out of Hudson's pocket after the man pushed Hudson.

During his adulthood, Hudson struggled with alcoholism and temper issues. In 2004, he was married and his only child, a daughter, was born in 2006, but the marriage lasted for several years before it ended with a divorce. Hudson's ex-wife testified that Hudson was often violent due to his alcoholic tendencies and temper (which both persisted despite her attempt to reconcile their marriage), and on two occasions, Hudson threatened to kill her with a shotgun aimed at her head. A former girlfriend also stated she ended her relationship with Hudson due to his alcoholism and partly due to him throwing plates at her while she was taking care of her daughter, who was sick. Some of Hudson's friends described him to be a moody person with a quick temper, which worsened whenever he was intoxicated by alcohol.

== Murder trial ==
On September 26, 2017, jury selection commenced for the capital murder trial of William Hudson.

On November 1, 2017, Hudson officially went on trial for murdering the six campers at the Palestine campsite back in 2015. Hudson faced three counts of capital murder pertaining to the deaths of two of the victims, Carl Johnson and his daughter Hannah. Originally, Hudson submitted an insanity plea before he withdrew it midtrial.

During the trial, the jurors were shown the photographs of the crime scene and the recording of the 911 call made by the sole surviving victim. A forensic expert testified that the DNA from one of Hudson's victims, Hannah Johnson, was found on the crotch of the boxer shorts he was wearing when he was arrested, and the DNA of several of the victims was found on Hudson's clothing, tractor, and his hands and cuticles.

On November 7, 2017, the jury found Hudson guilty of all three counts of capital murder. Carina Lujambio, the mother of Nathan and Austin Kamp, stated that during the trial before the guilty verdict, she could feel the terror and fear harbored by the sole survivor during the shooting as the recording played in the courtroom, she hoped for Hudson to receive the death penalty, and stated, "Anything less than the death penalty is a misuse of everything our justice system stands for."

During the sentencing hearing, several people known to Hudson, including his ex-wife and ex-girlfriend, testified about his troubled life before the murders. Several medical professionals and psychologists also came to court to testify about Hudson's mental state. Among them, Tim Proctor, a psychologist and expert witness for the prosecution, testified that Hudson was a psychopath, which he diagnosed based on Hudson's personality problems and behavior issues since his adolescent years, and he also referred to Hudson's sister's testimony that her brother harmed animals in several instances during his younger years. A neurologist, Dr. Erin Phillips, testified that signs of atrophy were in Hudson's brain, and the defense argued that Hudson's mental and cognitive states were affected by substance abuse and injury from past accidents, as part of their submissions to oppose the death penalty.

On November 15, 2017, Hudson was sentenced to death upon the jury's unanimous recommendation for capital punishment. In his statement to the media, Texas Attorney General Ken Paxton, who directed the prosecution to seek the death penalty, expressed his gratitude that justice had been served for the six victims of the campsite shooting and condemned Hudson as a "vicious killer".

After hearing the verdict, Lujambio stated that she was at peace because Hudson was sentenced to death for killing two of her four sons, and she stated that her native San Diego had lost "two outstanding citizens", describing her sons to be kind and compassionate.

== Death row and appeals ==
On April 14, 2021, the Texas Court of Criminal Appeals dismissed William Hudson's direct appeal against his death sentence.

A January 2022 report named Hudson as one of 19 inmates held on death row in Texas for murders committed in East Texas. A 2023 report showed that Hudson was one of 184 inmates held on death row in Texas.

As of 2025, Hudson remains on death row at the Allan B. Polunsky Unit.

== See also ==
- Capital punishment in Texas
- List of death row inmates in the United States § Texas
- List of mass shootings in the United States
