= Montalba, Texas =

Montalba
- Unincorporated community
- Location within the state of Texas Montalba (the United States)
- Coordinates: 31°52′36″N 95°43′58″W
- Country: United States
- State: Texas
- County: Anderson
- Elevation: 427 ft (130 m)
- Time zone: UTC-6 (Central (CST))
  - Summer (DST): UTC-5 (CDT)
- ZIP codes: 75853
- Area codes: 903, 430
- GNIS feature ID: 1363057

Montalba is an unincorporated community in central Anderson County, Texas, United States. According to the Handbook of Texas, the community had a population of 809 in 2019. It is located within the Palestine, Texas micropolitan area.

== History ==
Although Montalba is unincorporated, it has a post office, with the ZIP code of 75853.

== Geography ==
Montalba lies along Texas State Highway 19, 10 mi (16 km) northwest of the city of Palestine, the county seat of Anderson County in the north central part of the county.

== Education ==
Today the community is served by the Palestine Independent School District.

== Notable person ==
Elton Bomer, formerly state representative and Texas Secretary of State, resides in Montalba.
