= Texas State Highway 294 =

State highway in Texas

State Highway 294
- SH 294, highlighted in red

Route information
- Maintained by TxDOT
- Length: 42.18 mi (67.88 km)
- Existed: 1939–present

Major junctions
- West end: US 79 / US 84 near Oakwood
- US 287 / SH 19 at Elkhart
- East end: SH 21 at Alto

Location
- Country: United States
- State: Texas

Highway system
- Highways in Texas; Interstate; US; State; Former; Toll; Loops; Spurs; FM/RM; Park; Rec
← SH 293	→ SH 295

State Highway 294 (SH 294) is a state highway in the U.S. state of Texas that runs from U.S. Highway 79 and U.S. Highway 84 (US 79/US 84) east to Alto in East Texas. The 42-mile-long (68 km) route was designated on September 26, 1939 along its current route, replacing part of State Highway 7 (SH 7).

== Route description ==
SH 294 begins at an intersection with US 79/US 84 in far southwestern Anderson County and proceeds to the east through agricultural and forested areas. The route intersects US 287/SH 19 in the town of Elkhart, and is concurrent with those two routes to the southeast towards Crockett. Just southeast of town, SH 294 splits from US 287/SH 19 and continues to the east through the southern portion of Anderson County. The route then crosses the Neches River into Cherokee County. It then continues through the southwest section of the county before reaching its terminus at SH 21 in Alto.

== History ==
The route of SH 294 was originally slated to be an eastward extension of SH 7 as early as 1933. On September 26, 1939, SH 7 was rerouted across a number of already-built routes further to the south. A few sections of the original route had already been constructed, including the bridge across the Neches River, and those that had not already been assigned to SH 7 were designated SH 294.

== Major junctions ==
County	Location	mi	km	Destinations	Notes
Anderson				US 79 / US 84	
Anderson				US 287 / SH 19 – Elkhart	
Cherokee				SH 21 – Alto	
1.000 mi = 1.609 km; 1.000 km = 0.621 mi
