= Wild Cat Bluff, Texas =

Ghost town in Andersen County, Texas

Wild Cat Bluff is a ghost town in northwestern Anderson County, Texas, United States, and is a part of the Palestine, Texas micropolitan area.

== History ==
Wild Cat Bluff was located where Wildcat Creek enters the Trinity River, and served as a ferry crossing and a shipping point for area farmers. Wild Cat Bluff thrived while the river served as a main form of transportation, but declined after the arrival of the railroads to the county in 1870. Some of the residents moved to the new community developing to the east.

== See also ==
- Jarvis, Texas
- List of ghost towns in Texas
