= Texas State Highway 19 =

State highway in Texas

State Highway 19

Route information
- Maintained by TxDOT
- Length: 188.4 mi (303.2 km)
- Existed: April 4, 1917–present

Major junctions
- South end: I-45 in Huntsville
- US 190 in Huntsville; US 84 in Palestine; US 79 in Palestine; I-20 in Canton; US 80 near Fruitvale; I-30 / US 67 in Sulphur Springs
- North end: Bus. US 82 / Bus. US 271 in Paris

Location
- Country: United States
- State: Texas

Highway system
- Highways in Texas; Interstate; US; State; Former; Toll; Loops; Spurs; FM/RM; Park; Rec
← SH 18	→ I-20

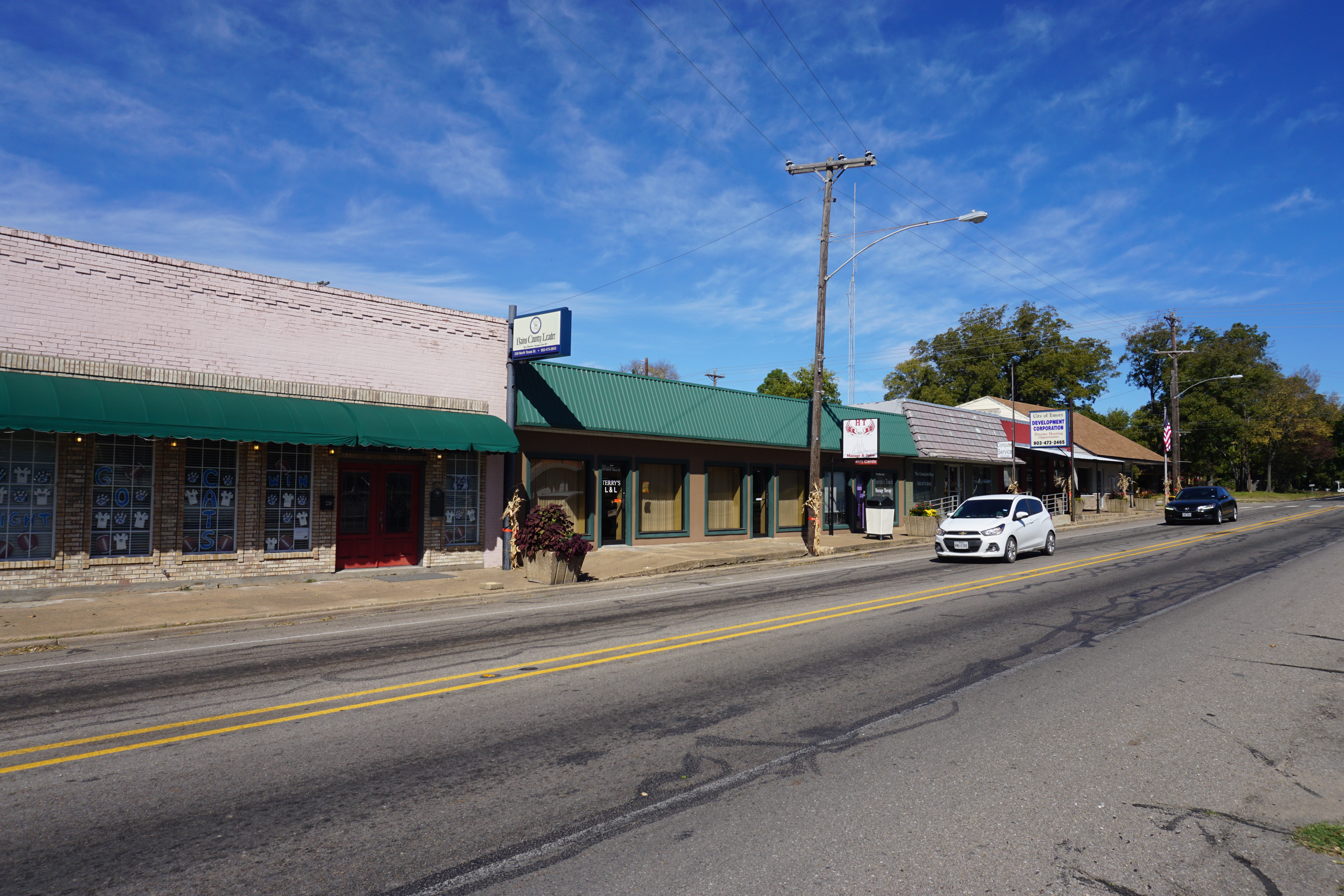
Texas State Highway 19 in Emory

State Highway 19 (SH 19) is a state highway in Texas runs from Huntsville to Paris in east Texas.

== Route description ==
SH 19 begins at an interchange with Interstate 45 in southeast Huntsville. The highway runs through the eastern edge of the town as an expressway running close to the Sam Houston National Forest. The expressway ends at an intersection with SH 30 and runs through rural areas before reaching the town of Trinity. SH 19 runs north towards Crockett where the highway begins a concurrency with US 287. The two highways leave each other just northwest of Palestine. SH 19 runs northwest to Athens, running around the town with US 175/SH 31. The highway next runs through Canton, where it intersects I-20. SH 19 runs through more rural areas of East Texas until the highway comes to Emory. The highway turns more northeast before running through the western part of Sulphur Springs. SH 154 joins SH 19, before leaving just east of Cooper. SH 24 joins the highway, where the two highways run together before ending in Paris.

A widening project for SH 19 between Montalba, north of Palestine, and Athens began in 2013, providing passing lanes, left turn lanes, and a shoulder. The segment in Henderson County was completed in 2014, but the Anderson County portion was not completed until spring 2019.

== History ==
Historic SH 19

SH 19 was one of the original 25 Texas state highways proposed on June 21, 1917, overlaid on top of the Paris-Houston Highway. The original proposal was for it to run from the Texas/Oklahoma border north of Paris to Houston. On February 5, 1918, it was extended south to Freeport. On August 21, 1923, SH 19 was pared back significantly, eliminating the section north of Grand Saline. On August 4, 1932, it had extended north to Alba. On May 13, 1935, it was rerouted to end in Fruitvale. On September 4, 1935, an eventual extension via Emory, Commerce, Ladonia, and Bonham to Oklahoma was proposed. On August 1, 1936, the section from Canton to Grand Saline was restored as SH 19T. SH 19T was cancelled when the rerouting of SH 19 from Canton to Fruitvale opened. On September 26, 1939, the sections south of Palestine which were cosigned with US 287 and US 75 were dropped. One section became part of SH 45 (now SH 30), and another was renumbered to SH 288. On April 15, 1940, SH 19 was extended north to Sulphur Springs, a modification of the much longer proposed extension that was not designated. On September 26, 1945, SH 19 was routed over FM 647 from 1 mile south of the Hopkins County line through Emory to Dunbar. On August 24, 1960, it was extended northward to its original starting point of Paris and again to the south to Huntsville, replacing a portion of SH 45. On May 21, 1979, SH 19 was extended over Loop 405 in Huntsville.

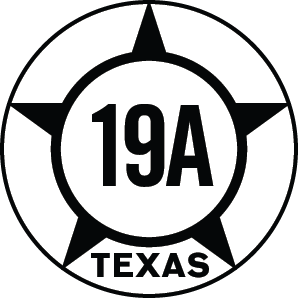
Historic SH 19A

SH 19A was a spur route of SH 19 that was originally planned on February 18, 1919, splitting off at Angleton and traveling to Palacios. On March 19, 1923, it was extended east to Galveston and west to Ganado, with the old route to Palacios being changed to SH 19B. On August 21, 1923, the route had been renumbered as SH 58 (now SH 35).

SH 19B was a spur route of SH 19 that was originally planned on March 19, 1923, from Midfield to Palacios replacing part of rerouted SH 19A. On August 21, 1923, the route had been renumbered as SH 59.

== Junction list ==
County	Location	mi	km	Destinations	Notes
Walker	Huntsville	0.0	0.0	I-45 – Dallas, Houston	Southern terminus; I-45 exit 113
Walker	Huntsville	1.4	2.3	SH 75	Interchange
Walker	Huntsville	1.6	2.6	FM 3411 east	No southbound access
Walker	Huntsville	2.4	3.9	US 190 / Bearkat Boulevard – Sam Houston State University	Interchange
Walker	Huntsville	4.1	6.6	SH 30	Interchange
Walker	Huntsville	4.8	7.7	FM 2821 (Fish Hatchery Road)	Interchange; north end of expressway
Walker	Huntsville	6.0	9.7	SH 30 south	
Walker	Riverside	15.3	24.6	FM 405 south – Dodge	
Walker	Riverside	15.8	25.4	FM 980 – W.J. Estelle Unit, Ellis Unit	
Trinity River		16.3	26.2	Unnamed bridge	
Trinity		19.3	31.1	FM 3453 east	
Trinity	Trinity	20.5	33.0	FM 1617 north	
Trinity	Trinity	21.1	34.0	FM 1617 south	
Trinity	Trinity	21.7	34.9	FM 230 west (Main Street)	
Trinity	Trinity	21.8	35.1	SH 94 east to FM 356 – Groveton, Lufkin	
Trinity	Barnes Switch	26.6	42.8	FM 1893 north	
Houston	Lovelady	35.7	57.5	FM 230 west / FM 1280 – Austonio, Friday	
Houston		41.0	66.0	FM 231 south	
Houston	Crockett	48.2	77.6	Loop 304 (truck route)	
Houston	Crockett	48.7	78.4	FM 2110 south (Austin Street)	
Houston	Crockett	49.7	80.0	SH 7 west / SH 21 west	South end of SH 7/SH 21 overlap
Houston	Crockett	49.76	80.08	US 287 south / SH 7 east	North end of SH 7 overlap; south end of US 287 overlap
Houston	Crockett	49.82	80.18	SH 21 east	North end of SH 21 overlap
Houston	Crockett	51.2	82.4	Loop 304 (truck route)	
Houston		53.0	85.3	FM 2160 west	
Houston	Latexo	55.5	89.3	FM 2663 east	
Houston	Grapeland	61.6	99.1	Bus. US 287 north – Grapeland	
Houston	Grapeland	62.2	100.1	FM 2423	
Houston	Grapeland	63.1	101.5	FM 227 – Grapeland, Augusta	
Houston	Grapeland	63.5	102.2	FM 228	
Houston		64.4	103.6	Bus. US 287 south – Grapeland	
Anderson		72.8	117.2	SH 294 east – Slocum	South end of SH 294 overlap
Anderson	Elkhart	73.3	118.0	FM 1817 north – Alderbranch	
Anderson	Elkhart	73.7	118.6	SH 294 west – Downtown Elkhart	North end of SH 294 overlap
Anderson		79.3	127.6	FM 2419 south	
Anderson	Palestine	81.6	131.3	Loop 256 (truck route)	
Anderson	Palestine	83.4	134.2	US 84 east (Park Avenue)	South end of US 84 overlap
Anderson	Palestine	83.7	134.7	US 84 west / US 287 north (Spring Street)	North end of US 84/ US 287 overlap
Anderson	Palestine	83.9	135.0	Loop 127 (Crawford Street)	
Anderson	Palestine	84.4	135.8	US 79 north (Palestine Avenue) – Jacksonville	South end of US 79 overlap
Anderson	Palestine	84.5	136.0	SH 155 north (Link Street) – Tyler, Frankston	
Anderson	Palestine	85.7	137.9	US 79 south / US 287 south – Austin	North end of US 79 overlap; south end of US 287 overlap
Anderson	Palestine	86.4	139.0	Loop 256	Interchange
Anderson		88.3	142.1	US 287 north – Corsicana	North end of US 287 overlap; access to Palestine Municipal Airport
Anderson	Montalba	95.1	153.0	FM 321 – Tennessee Colony, Neches	
Anderson		96.8	155.8	FM 2330 west	
Anderson	Bois d'Arc	100.9	162.4	FM 860 west – Blackfoot	
Anderson	Bradford	103.2	166.1	FM 837 – Springfield, Brushy Creek	
Henderson	Athens	115.7	186.2	FM 1615 south	
Henderson	Athens	115.8	186.4	FM 753 west – Malakoff	
Henderson	Athens	116.5	187.5	Loop 7 west / Bus. SH 19 north – Athens	Interchange; south end of Loop 7 overlap
Henderson	Athens	118.9	191.4	US 175 east / Bus. US 175 west – Jacksonville, Athens	Interchange; south end of US 175 overlap
Henderson	Athens	120.3	193.6	FM 2495 – Athens	Interchange
Henderson	Athens	121.7	195.9	SH 31 east / Bus. SH 31 west – Tyler, Athens	Interchange; south end of SH 31 overlap
Henderson	Athens	122.4	197.0	FM 1616 – Murchison	
Henderson	Athens	124.1	199.7	Loop 7 west (US 175 west/SH 31 west) / Bus. SH 19 south – Athens	Interchange; north end of US 175/SH 31/Loop 7 overlap
Henderson		127.1	204.5	FM 2752 east	
Henderson		129.6	208.6	FM 2709 west – Eustace	
Van Zandt		133.3	214.5	FM 1861 – Eustace, Martins Mill, Purtis Creek State Park	
Van Zandt		135.9	218.7	FM 1256 west to FM 316	
Van Zandt		137.3	221.0	FM 858 east – Martins Mill	
Van Zandt		142.4	229.2	FM 1651 west – Tundra	
Van Zandt		145.2	233.7	RM 2909 south – Mt. Pisgah, Walnut Springs, Martins Mill	
Van Zandt	Canton	146.1	235.1	SH 243 – Kaufman, Tyler	
Van Zandt	Canton	146.9	236.4	SH 64 (Dallas Street) – Wills Point, Tyler	
Van Zandt	Canton	148.4	238.8	I-20 – Dallas, Tyler, Shreveport	I-20 exit 527.
Van Zandt		156.0	251.1	US 80 – Edgewood, Grand Saline	
Van Zandt		161.2	259.4	FM 859 south – Edgewood	
Sabine River		161.8	260.4	Unnamed bridge	
Rains		165.3	266.0	FM 2324 west – Flats, Lake Tawakoni	
Rains	Emory	167.9	270.2	FM 3274 south	
Rains	Emory	168.0	270.4	US 69 – Greenville, Mineola	
Rains	Emory	168.1	270.5	FM 2795	
Rains	Emory	168.6	271.3	FM 275 north – Miller Grove	
Rains		173.9	279.9	FM 514 west – Point	South end of FM 514 overlap
Rains		174.4	280.7	FM 514 east – Yantis, Lake Fork Reservoir	North end of FM 514 overlap
Hopkins		179.0	288.1	FM 1567 west – Miller Grove	South end of FM 1567 overlap
Hopkins		179.3	288.6	FM 1567 east – Arbala	North end of FM 1567 overlap
Hopkins	Sulphur Springs	186.3	299.8	SH 11 east – Winnsboro	South end of SH 11 overlap
Hopkins	Sulphur Springs	186.9	300.8	I-30 (US 67) – Dallas, Texarkana	I-30 exit 122.
Hopkins	Sulphur Springs	187.8	302.2	Bus. US 67 to I-30 – Sulphur Springs	
Hopkins	Sulphur Springs	188.4	303.2	SH 11 west – Commerce	North end of SH 11 overlap
Hopkins	Sulphur Springs	189.9	305.6	FM 2285 – Peerless	Access to CHRISTUS Mother Frances Hospital - Sulphur Springs
Hopkins	Sulphur Springs	191.6	308.4	SH 154 east (Church Street) / Loop 301 south – Sulphur Springs	South end of SH 154 overlap
Hopkins		193.1	310.8	FM 1537 east – Mahoney	
Hopkins		198.4	319.3	FM 71 – Cooper State Park	
Hopkins	Tira	202.0	325.1	FM 1536 east – Tira	
South Sulphur River		204.3	328.8	Unnamed bridge	
Delta		205.2	330.2	SH 154 west – Cooper	North end of SH 154 overlap
Delta		206.6	332.5	FM 1529 west – Cooper	
Delta		207.8	334.4	FM 895 east – Charleston	
Delta		211.0	339.6	SH 24 south – Cooper	South end of SH 24 overlap
Delta		211.6	340.5	FM 198 – Enloe, Lake Creek	
Delta		212.2	341.5	FM 1335 south	
North Sulphur River		213.3	343.3	Unnamed bridge	
Lamar		215.6	347.0	FM 1184	
Lamar		219.1	352.6	FM 2036 west – Atlas	
Lamar	Paris	223.4	359.5	Loop 286 to US 82 / US 271 – Bonham, Clarksville, Mt. Pleasant	Interchange; access to Paris Regional Medical Center
Lamar	Paris	224.0	360.5	FM 1497 south (3rd Street Southeast)	
Lamar	Paris	224.4	361.1	FM 1507 east – Eiffel Tower	
Lamar	Paris	225.7	363.2	Bus. US 82 east / Bus. US 271 (Clarksville Street) Bus. US 82 west / Bus. US 271 north	Northern terminus of SH 19/SH 24
1.000 mi = 1.609 km; 1.000 km = 0.621 mi: Concurrency terminus; Incomplete access

== Business routes ==
SH 19 has one business route.

=== Athens business loop ===
Business State Highway 19-J
- Location: Athens
- Length: 4.186 mi (6.737 km)
- Existed: 2010–present

Business State Highway 19-J (Bus. SH 19-J) is a 4.186 mi (6.737 km) long business route through Athens. The route was designated on May 27, 2004 after SH 19 proper was re-routed east onto the Jed Robinson Loop, also designated as US 175, SH 31 and Loop 7 (formerly FM 317). Bus. SH 19-J begins at an interchange with the Jed Robinson Loop and SH 19, north of downtown Athens, heading south on North Palestine Street, while SH 19 heads east along the loop around the city. Bus. SH 19-J continues south through the town square, which is the location of the Henderson County Courthouse and also comprises the junction with Bus. SH 31-H (Tyler Street) and Bus. US 175-G (Corsicana Street). For a short distance, the business route is paralleled by FM 2494, which takes South Praireville Street, before cutting east, away from Bus. SH 19-J on Lakeside Drive. The business route curves southeast, still following Palestine Street, past the northern terminus of FM 59 at West Cayuga Drive, before reaching its southern terminus at the Jim Robinson Loop, where SH 19 splits from Loop 7 and serves as a continuation of the route.

Major intersections

The entire route is in Athens, Henderson County.

mi	km	Destinations	Notes
0.000	0.000	SH 19 north / Loop 7 (Jim Robinson Loop) SH 19 south – Palestine	Southern terminus; road continues south as SH 19
1.471	2.367	FM 39 south (West Cayuga Drive)	Northern terminus of FM 39
2.582	4.155	Bus. US 175 (Corsicana Street)	
2.658	4.278	Bus. SH 31-H (Tyler Street)	
4.186	6.737	US 175 / SH 19 south / SH 31 / Loop 7 (Jim Robinson Loop) – Malakoff, Eustace SH 19 north – Canton	Northern terminus; road continues north as SH 19
1.000 mi = 1.609 km; 1.000 km = 0.621 mi
