= Alderbranch, Texas =

- Unincorporated community
- Location within Texas Location within the United States
- Coordinates: 31°41′20″N 95°27′29″W
- Country: United States
- State: Texas
- County: Anderson
- Elevation: 367 ft (112 m)
- Time zone: UTC-6 (Central (CST))
  - Summer (DST): UTC-5 (CDT)
- Area codes: 430 & 903
- GNIS feature ID: 1379330

Alderbranch is an unincorporated community in Anderson County, located in the U.S. state of Texas. According to the Handbook of Texas, only five people lived in the community in 2000. It is located within the Palestine, Texas micropolitan area.

== History ==
A post office was established at Alderbranch in 1863 and remained in operation until 1913. Its name was divided into two words, Alder Branch until it was eventually changed into one full word in the 1930s. B.F. Chambers established a sawmill in the community in the early 1880s. By 1884, there were water-powered sawmills, two churches, two general stores, and cotton gins in the community. In 1896, it had a Methodist and Baptist church, two sawmills, two cotton gins, a flour mill, and gin, and one general store. Only one business was reported in the community in the 1930s and a sawmill was located less than a mile east. Several scattered dwellings were in the community in 1982 and was listed on highway maps in 1985. In 1884, 40 people inhabited the community. It reached its population zenith of 60 circa 1890, but it decreased to 30 as of 1896. In the 1930s, 25 people lived in Alderbranch, and by 2000, only five people lived there.

On April 18, 2019, a home in Alderbranch was blown off its foundation during a storm. The family who lived in the home was asleep inside the house when the house was pushed 10 feet off its foundation, the roof was blown off, and the back was destroyed. Debris from half of the roof was found approximately 30 yards east of the house. After the incident, neighbors provided food, shelter, and supplies for the family while they gathered their belongings.

== Geography ==
Alderbranch sits along Farm to Market Road 323, 11 mi (18 km) southeast of Palestine, and is the Alder Branch of Squirrel Creek in southeastern Anderson County.

== Education ==
In 1884, Alderbranch had a district school, which disappeared by 1896. Today, the community is served by the Slocum Independent School District.
