= Westwood High School (Palestine, Texas) =

Public school in Texas, United States

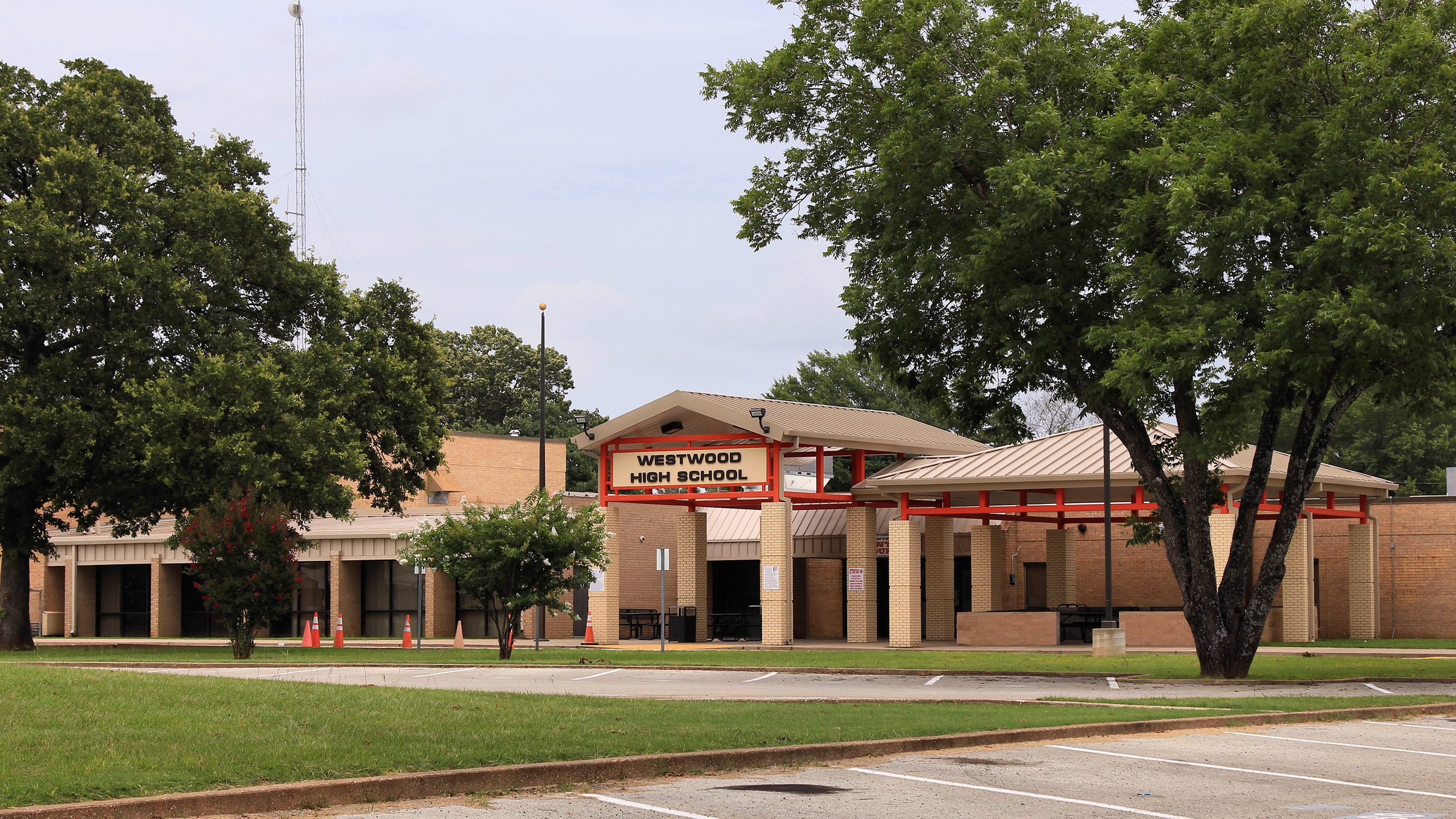

Location
- 1820 Panther Blvd. Palestine, Anderson County, Texas 75803-8483; United States; 31.7303°N 95.6800°W

Information
- School type: Public, high school
- Motto: Academics First, Excellence Always
- Locale: Town: Distant
- School district: Westwood ISD
- Superintendent: Wade Stanford
- NCES School ID: 484329004915
- Principal: Scott Nettles
- Faculty: 36.84 (on an FTE basis)
- Grades: 9–12
- Enrollment: 404 (2023–2024)
- Student to teacher ratio: 10.97
- Colors: Orange, Black & White
- Athletics conference: UIL Class 3A
- Mascot: Panthers/Lady Panthers
- Website: Westwood High School

Westwood High School is a public high school located in Palestine, Texas, United States, and classified as a 3A school by the University Interscholastic League (UIL). It is part of the Westwood Independent School District located in west central Anderson County. The school is located on US Hwy 79 just west of the city of Palestine. During 2023–2024, Westwood High School had an enrollment of 404 students and a student to teacher ratio of 10.97. The school received an overall rating of "C" from the Texas Education Agency for the 2024–2025 school year.

== Athletics ==
The Westwood Panthers compete in these sports:

- Baseball
- Basketball
- Cross country
- Football
- Golf
- Powerlifting
- Softball
- Tennis
- Track and field
- Volleyball
- Soccer

=== State Finalists ===
- Boys Basketball
  - 2026(3A/D2)
