= Westwood Independent School District =

School district in Texas, United States

Coordinates: 31°43′37.4″N 95°40′52.8″W

Location
- Palestine, Texas ESC Region 7 United States

District information
- Type: Public Independent school district
- Motto: Building a Foundation of Excellence
- Grades: EE through 12
- Superintendent: Ed Lyman
- Schools: 4
- NCES District ID: 4843290

Students and staff
- Students: 1,365 (2023–2024)
- Teachers: 107.19 (on an FTE basis) (2023–2024)
- Staff: 145.69 (on an FTE basis) (2023–2024)
- Student–teacher ratio: 12.73 (2023–2024)

Other information
- Website: www.westwoodisd.net

Westwood Independent School District is a public school district based in Palestine, Texas, United States. The district serves part of Palestine and rural areas in west-central Anderson County.

In 2009, the school district was rated "academically acceptable" by the Texas Education Agency.

== Schools ==
- Westwood High School (grades 9-12)
- Westwood Junior High School (grades 7-8)
- Westwood Elementary School (grades 3-6)
- Westwood Primary School early childhood education-grade 2)
