= Palestine Herald-Press =

American daily newspaper

- Type: Daily newspaper
- Format: Broadsheet
- Owner(s): CNHI
- Publisher: Jake Mienk
- Editor: PennyLynn Webb
- Founded: 1849, as Palestine Advocate
- Language: English
- Headquarters: 519 Elm Street; Palestine, Texas 75802; United States
- Circulation: 1,880 (as of 2023)
- Website: palestineherald.com

The Palestine Herald-Press is a daily newspaper published in Palestine, Texas, distributed in Tuesday through Friday mornings and a Weekend edition delivered on Saturday mornings. It is owned by CNHI.

== History ==
Founded in 1849 as the Palestine Advocate, the Palestine Daily Herald came about following the Hamilton family's 1903 merger of the Advocate with the Palestine Press and Palestine Daily Visitor. The name "Press" was added under the Patrick family's ownership in 1966. That family sold the paper in 1998 to Alabama-based CNHI.

In 2008, the manager of the Herald-Press was accused of embezzling over $100,000 from the paper.

In 2020, Editor Jeffery Gerritt won the Pulitzer Prize for Editorial Writing for an editorial series titled "Death Without Conviction." The series focused on a record number of inmates who died while in custody in county jails across Texas and compiled information obtained from Texas Public Information Act requests. Many inmates who died were pre-trial detainees who had not been convicted of crimes and were awaiting trial.
