= Anderson County, Texas =

County in Texas, United States

- County
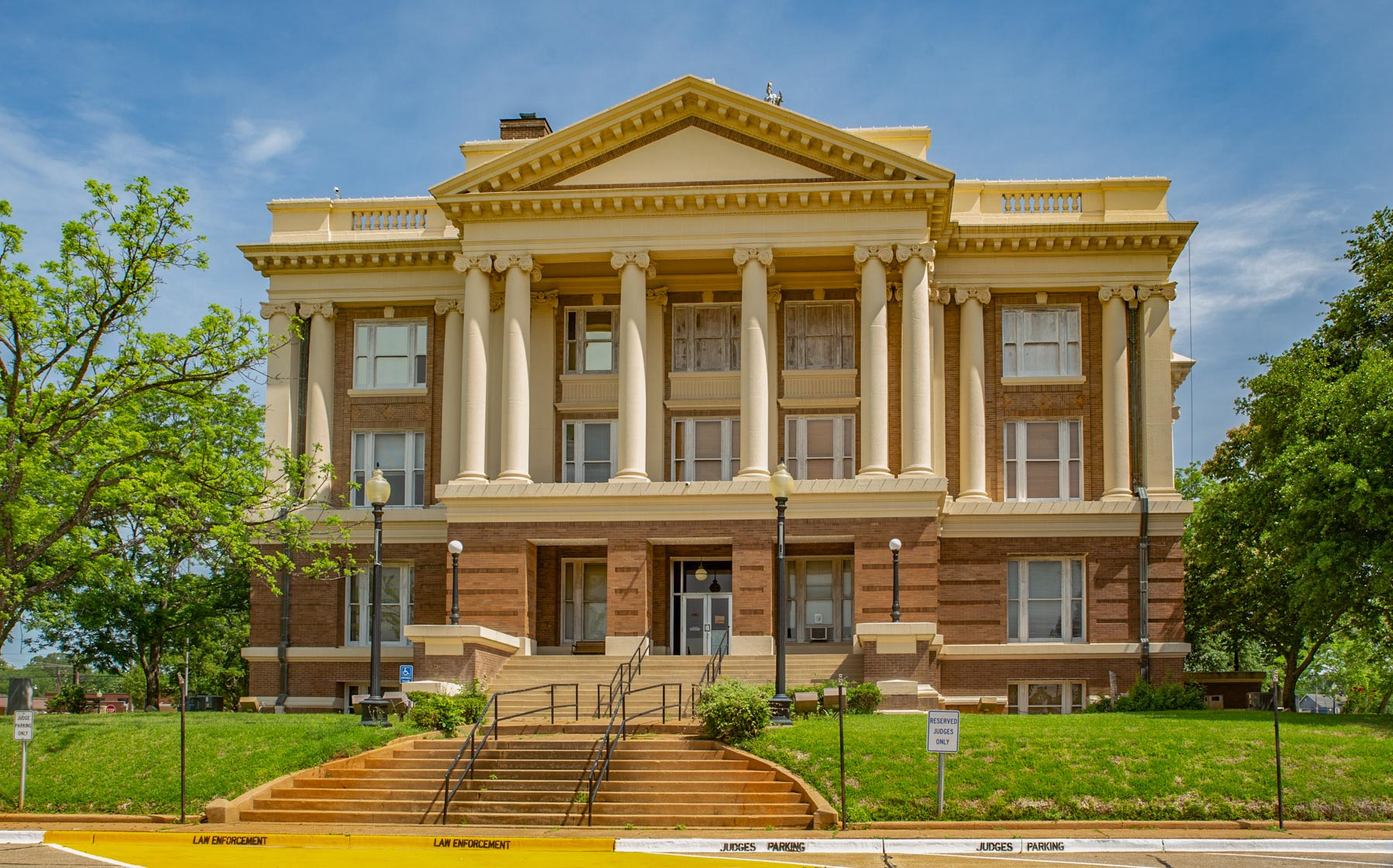
- The Anderson County Courthouse in Palestine

- Location within the U.S. state of Texas
- Coordinates: 31°49′N 95°39′W
- Country: United States
- State: Texas
- Founded: March 24, 1846
- Named for: Kenneth L. Anderson
- Seat: Palestine
- Largest city: Palestine

Area
  - Total: 1,078 sq mi (2,790 km^{2})
  - Land: 1,063 sq mi (2,750 km^{2})
  - Water: 15 sq mi (39 km^{2}) 1.4%

Population (2020)
  - Total: 57,922
  - Estimate (2025): 59,805 ▲
  - Density: 54/sq mi (21/km^{2})
- Time zone: UTC−6 (Central)
  - Summer (DST): UTC−5 (CDT)
- Congressional district: 6th
- Website: www.andersoncountytx.gov

Anderson County is a county in the U.S. state of Texas. Located within East Texas, its county seat is Palestine. As of the 2020 United States census, its population was 57,922. Anderson County comprises the Palestine micropolitan statistical area. Anderson County was organized in 1846 and was named after Kenneth Lewis Anderson (1805–1845), the last vice president of the Republic of Texas.

== History ==
=== Native Americans ===
Native Americans friendly to the settlers resided in East Texas before the Kiowa, Kickapoo, Kichai, Apache, and Comanche relocated to the territory. These tribes hunted, farmed the land, and were adept traders. By 1772, they had settled on the Brazos at Waco and on the Trinity upstream from present Palestine. The Tawakoni branch of Wichita Indians originated north of Texas, but migrated south into East Texas. From 1843 onward, the Tawakoni were part of treaties made by both the Republic of Texas and the United States.

On May 19, 1836, an alliance of Comanche, Kiowa, Caddo, and Wichita attacked Fort Parker (Limestone County), killing and taking settlers captive. The survivors escaped to Fort Houston, which had been erected in Anderson County in 1835 as protection against Indians. Some early residents of Anderson County were related to Cynthia Ann Parker, who was among the captives.

In October 1838, Gen. Thomas Jefferson Rusk conducted a raid against hostile Indians at Kickapoo, near Frankston. This ended the engagements with the Indians in East Texas for that year.

=== Anglo settlement ===
In 1826, empresario David G. Burnet received a grant from the Coahuila y Tejas legislature to settle 300 families in what is now Anderson County. Most of the settlers came from the southern states and Missouri.

Baptist leader Daniel Parker and eight other men organized the Pilgrim Predestinarian Regular Baptist Church in Lamotte, Illinois in 1833. This entire group migrated to the Texas frontier, arriving in Austins Colony in November 1833, and establishing Fort Parker (Limestone County) in 1834. In October 1834, in consequence of "their members were becoming scattered in a wilderness," the Church agreed to adjourn until the majority of their members settled.

After the Texas Revolution and the attack on Fort Parker, Daniel Parker and some of the survivors moved to Fort Houston (Anderson County). They established a new community south of the fort.

=== Incorporation ===
The First Legislature of the State of Texas formed Anderson County from Houston County on March 24, 1846. The county was named for Kenneth Lewis Anderson. Palestine was named the county seat.

Anderson County voted for secession from the Union. When the American Civil War began, former Palestine district judge Judge John H. Reagan served in the cabinet of the Confederate government as postmaster general, being captured at the end of the war and spending 22 months in solitary confinement. During Reconstruction, District Nine Court Judge Reuben A. Reeves, a resident of Palestine, was removed from office as "an obstruction to Reconstruction" in part because of his refusal to allow blacks to participate as jurors in the judicial process.

In 1875, the International – Great Northern Railroad placed its machine and repair shops and general offices in Palestine, causing the community to double in size over the next 5 years. For a time, it was a rough railroad town, dominated by male workers.

White violence against blacks occurred in the county, most frequently by lynchings of black men. But in July 1910, at least 22 blacks were killed in white rioting near Slocum, a majority-black community, in what is called the Slocum massacre. Racial and economic tensions had been high in the post-Reconstruction era and southern states had disenfranchised blacks and imposed Jim Crow in furtherance of white supremacy. Anderson County tied for 13th place in a list of the 25 American counties with the highest number of lynchings between 1877 and 1950 (all were located in the South).

Oral tradition in the African-American community holds that as many as 200 blacks may have been killed in the massacre. An estimated 200 whites rioted and attacked blacks on the roads, in the fields, and in Slocum on July 29–30, 1910. Many black homes were burned, and black families fled for their lives, having to abandon their property and assets. This town is about 20 miles east of the county seat at Palestine.

At the time, as was usual, white newspapers described such events as a "race riot" by blacks. Texas newspapers had contributed to problems by reporting false rumors that 200 blacks were arming. Afterward, 11 men were arrested and seven were indicted, including James Spurger, said by many to be the instigator, but no prosecution resulted. The massacre had been preceded by racial tensions, rumors, and, for 6 months, at least one lynching per month of Blacks in East Texas.

In January 2016, the state installed a highway historical marker in Slocum to recognize this unprovoked white attack on the black community. It was part of a history of white violence against blacks.

In 1926, the Humble Oil and Refining Company, in partnership with the Rio Bravo Company, started an exploration drilling program along Boggy Creek, in what turned our to be the Boggy Creek salt dome. On March 19, 1927, the Elliott and Clark No. 1 encountered the Woodbine Formation at a depth of 3,838 feet (1,170 m) and produced 62 barrels of oil per hour, but showed salt water after producing only 15,000 barrels. On November 10, 1927, the Elliott and Clark No. 2, 150 feet to the west, was completed as a gas well. On February 4, 1928, the first oil-producing well in Anderson County, the Humble-Lizzie Smith No. 1, was completed, producing 80 BOPD. By May 1931, 80 wells had been drilled in the Boggy Creek Oil Field, 6 of which produced gas, 33 oil, and 41 were dry holes.

The Fairway Oil Field was discovered in 1960, and straddles the border of Anderson and Henderson Counties. Oil is produced from the Lower Cretaceous James Limestone member of the Pearsall formation.

The Gus Engeling Wildlife Management Area was purchased by the state between 1950 and 1960, much of it formerly owned by Milze L. Derden. The area was renamed in 1952 for Gus A. Engeling, the first state biologist assigned to the area who was killed by a poacher on December 13, 1951.

== Geography ==
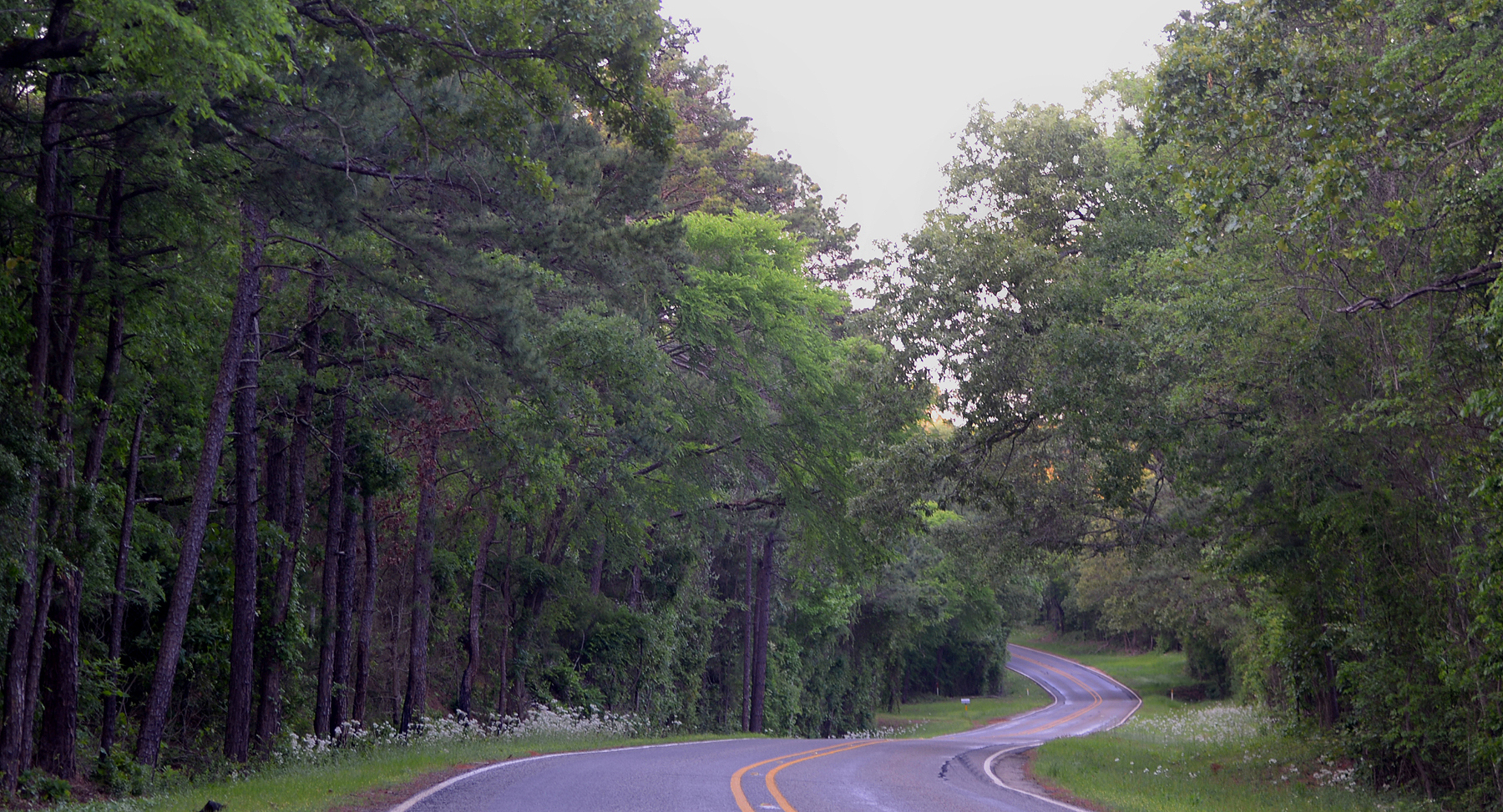
Farm to Market Road 315 north of Palestine, Anderson County, Texas, USA (April 2017)

Anderson County is situated at the threshold of two ecoregions, the piney woods to the east, and the East Central Texas forests, also referred to as post oak savanna to the west. The terrain of Anderson County consists of hills carved by drainages and gullies, with numerous lakes and ponds. The Trinity River flows southward along the west boundary line of the county; the Neches River flows southward along its east boundary line, and Brushy Creek flows southeastward through the central portion of the county. The terrain slopes to the south and east, with its highest points along the midpoint of its northern boundary line at 551 ft (168 m) ASL. The county has a total area of 1,078 square miles (2,790 km^{2}), of which 1,063 square miles (2,750 km^{2}) are land and 15 square miles (39 km^{2}) (1.4%) are covered by water.

The county is wholly located within area codes 430 and 903.

=== Major highways ===
- U.S. Highway 79
- U.S. Highway 84
- U.S. Highway 175
- U.S. Highway 287
- State Highway 19
- State Highway 155
- State Highway 294
- Loop 127
- Loop 256
- Spur 324

=== Adjacent counties ===
- Henderson County (north)
- Cherokee County (east)
- Houston County (south)
- Leon County (southwest)
- Freestone County (west)

=== Protected areas ===
- Big Lake Bottom Wildlife Management Area (part)
- Gus Engeling Wildlife Management Area
- Neches River National Wildlife Refuge (part)
- Richland Creek Wildlife Management Area (part)

=== Lakes ===
- Big Twin Lake
- Cox Lake
- Crystal Lake
- Hudson Lake
- Lake Dogwood
- Lake Frankston
- Lost Prairie Lake
- Pineywoods Lake
- Spring Lake
- Williams Lake

== Communities ==
=== City ===
- Palestine (county seat)

=== Towns ===
- Elkhart
- Frankston

=== Census designated places ===
- Neches

=== Unincorporated areas ===
- Alderbranch
- Bethel
- Blackfoot
- Bois d'Arc
- Bradford
- Brushy Creek
- Cayuga
- Cronin
- Crystal Lake
- Elmtown
- Elmwood
- Fosterville
- Greens Bluff
- Long Lake
- Massey Lake
- Montalba
- Mound City (partly in Houston County)
- Pert
- Salmon
- Slocum
- Springfield
- Swanson Hill Church
- Tennessee Colony
- Todd City
- Tucker
- Wells Creek
- Yard

=== Ghost towns ===
- Jarvis
- Wild Cat Bluff

=== Population ranking ===
The population ranking of the following table is based on the 2020 census of Anderson County.

† county seat

Rank	City/Town/etc.	Municipal type	Population (2010 Census)	1	† Palestine	City	57,496	2	'Elkhart	Town	1,299	3	Frankston	1,170

== Demographics ==
Historical population
Census	Pop.	Note	%±
1850	2,684		—
1860	10,398		287.4%
1870	9,229		−11.2%
1880	17,395		88.5%
1890	20,923		20.3%
1900	28,015		33.9%
1910	29,650		5.8%
1920	34,318		15.7%
1930	34,643		0.9%
1940	37,092		7.1%
1950	31,875		−14.1%
1960	28,162		−11.6%
1970	27,789		−1.3%
1980	38,381		38.1%
1990	48,024		25.1%
2000	55,109		14.8%
2010	58,458		6.1%
2020	57,922		−0.9%
2025 (est.)	59,805	▲	3.3%
U.S. Decennial Census; 1850–1900 1910; 1920 1930 1940; 1950 1960 1970; 1980 1990 2000; 2010 2020

=== Racial and ethnic composition ===
Anderson County, Texas – Racial and ethnic composition Note: the US Census treats Hispanic/Latino as an ethnic category. This table excludes Latinos from the racial categories and assigns them to a separate category. Hispanics/Latinos may be of any race.
Race / Ethnicity (NH = Non-Hispanic)	Pop 1970	Pop 1980	Pop 1990	Pop 2000	Pop 2010	Pop 2020	% 1970	% 1980	% 1990	% 2000	% 2010	% 2020
White alone (NH)	20,759	28,283	32,665	34,762	35,792	33,098	74.70%	73.69%	68.02%	63.08%	61.23%	57.14%
Black or African American alone (NH)	6,948	8,115	11,091	12,897	12,222	11,430	25.00%	21.14%	23.09%	23.40%	20.91%	19.73%
Native American or Alaska Native alone (NH)	15	87	117	135	192	193	0.05%	0.23%	0.24%	0.24%	0.33%	0.33%
Asian alone (NH)	7	84	107	243	283	381	0.03%	0.22%	0.22%	0.44%	0.48%	0.66%
Native Hawaiian or Pacific Islander alone (NH)	x	x	x	7	16	13	x	x	x	0.01%	0.03%	0.02%
Other race alone (NH)	60	16	91	11	37	113	0.22%	0.04%	0.19%	0.02%	0.06%	0.20%
Mixed race or Multiracial (NH)	x	x	x	349	629	1,583	x	x	x	0.63%	1.08%	2.73%
Hispanic or Latino (any race)	x	1,796	3,953	6,705	9,287	11,111	x	4.68%	8.23%	12.17%	15.89%	19.18%
Total	27,789	38,381	48,024	55,109	58,458	57,922	100.00%	100.00%	100.00%	100.00%	100.00%	100.00%

=== 2020 census ===
As of the 2020 census, the county had a population of 57,922, which represented a 0.9% decline from the 58,458 residents recorded at the 2010 census. The median age was 40.7 years; 18.2% of residents were under the age of 18 and 16.3% were 65 years of age or older. For every 100 females there were 152.5 males, and for every 100 females age 18 and over there were 165.3 males age 18 and over.

The racial makeup of the county was 60.3% White, 20.0% Black or African American, 0.6% American Indian and Alaska Native, 0.7% Asian, <0.1% Native Hawaiian and Pacific Islander, 12.2% from some other race, and 6.2% from two or more races. Hispanic or Latino residents of any race comprised 19.2% of the population.

About 32.1% of residents lived in urban areas, while 67.9% lived in rural areas.

Of the 17,371 households in the county, 31.1% had children under 18 living in them, 48.7% were married-couple households, 17.8% were households with a male householder and no spouse or partner present, and 28.4% were households with a female householder and no spouse or partner present. About 27.0% of all households were made up of individuals, and 13.0% had someone living alone who was 65 or older.

About 13.7% of the 20,131 housing units were vacant. Among occupied housing units, 71.1% were owner-occupied and 28.9% were renter-occupied. The homeowner vacancy rate was 1.9%, and the rental vacancy rate was 10.2%.

=== 2020 American Community Survey ===
According to the 2020 American Community Survey five-year estimates, the median household income was $45,847, and 14.1% of the population lived at or below the poverty line. Among residents under 18, 21.5% were living in poverty, and 9.9% of those 65 or older were below the poverty line.

=== 2010 census ===
As of the 2010 census, Anderson County had 58,458 residents, up from 55,109 at the 2000 census.

=== 2000 census ===
From its initial population of 2,684 in the 1850 census, Anderson County's population increased to 55,109 people at the 2000 U.S. census. At that time, of the 15,678 households, 34.1% had children under 18 living with them, 55.5% were married couples living together, 13.2% had a female householder with no husband present, and 27.7% were not families. About 24.8% of all households were made up of individuals, and 11.8% had someone living alone who was 65 or older. In 2000, the median income for a household was $31,957 and for a family was $37,513. Males had a median income of $27,070 versus $21,577 for females, and the per capita income for the county was $13,838. About 12.70% of families and 16.50% of the population were below the poverty line, including 21.6% of those under 18 and 16.6% of those 65 or over.

== Government and politics ==
=== Government ===
Anderson County is governed by a commissioners' court. It consists of the county judge, who is elected at-large and presides over the full court, and four commissioners, who are elected from the county's four single-member precincts.

==== County commissioners ====
Office	Name	Party
County judge	Robert D. Johnston	Republican
Precinct 1	Greg Chapin	Republican
Precinct 2	Rashad Mims	Democratic
Precinct 3	Kenneth Dickson	Republican
Precinct 4	Joey Hill	Republican

==== County officials ====
Office	Name	Party
County clerk	Mark Staples	Republican
Criminal district attorney	Allyson Mitchell	Republican
District clerk	Teresa Coker	Republican
Sheriff	W. R. (Rudy) Flores	Republican
Tax assessor-collector	Teri Garvey Hanks	Republican
Treasurer	Tara Holliday	Republican

==== Constables ====
Office	Name	Party
Precinct 1	David Franklin	
Precinct 2	Doug Lightfoot	Republican
Precinct 3	Kim Dickson	Republican
Precinct 4	James Muniz	Republican

==== State prisons ====
The Texas Department of Criminal Justice operates state prisons for men in the county. The prisons Beto, Coffield, Michael, and Powledge units and the Gurney Unit transfer facility are located in an unincorporated area 7 miles (11 km) west of Palestine. The Beto Unit has the Correctional Institutions Division Region II maintenance headquarters.

=== Courts ===
==== Justices of the peace ====
Office	Name	Party
Precinct 1	Gary Thomas	
Precinct 2	Tammy Lightfoot	
Precinct 3	James Todd	Republican
Precinct 4	James Westley	Republican

==== County court at law ====
Jeff Doran, a Republican, is the judge of the county court at law.

==== District courts ====
Office	Name	Party
3rd district court	Mark Calhoon	Republican
87th district court	Deborah Oakes Evans	Republican
349th district court	Pam Foster Fletcher	Republican
369th district court	Michael Davis	Republican

=== Politics ===
Anderson is a strongly Republican county, voting Republican in every election since 1980 (as of 2020). The county last voted Democratic in 1976, when Jimmy Carter won 57% of the county's votes. Hillary Clinton managed to win just 19.8% of the vote in the county, the least of any presidential candidate since 1944.

United States presidential election results for Anderson County, Texas
Year	Republican		Democratic		Third party(ies)	
Year	No.	%	No.	%	No.	%
1912	444	19.38%	1,737	75.82%	110	4.80%
1916	501	18.71%	1,984	74.11%	192	7.17%
1920	323	8.23%	2,355	59.98%	1,248	31.79%
1924	562	47.19%	374	31.40%	255	21.41%
1928	1,814	50.94%	1,747	49.06%	0	0.00%
1932	259	5.60%	4,354	94.10%	14	0.30%
1936	289	7.15%	3,749	92.80%	2	0.05%
1940	688	11.51%	5,281	88.37%	7	0.12%
1944	467	8.53%	4,342	79.32%	665	12.15%
1948	1,199	23.07%	3,242	62.37%	757	14.56%
1952	4,637	57.18%	3,462	42.69%	10	0.12%
1956	4,181	60.47%	2,710	39.20%	23	0.33%
1960	3,642	52.16%	3,296	47.21%	44	0.63%
1964	3,362	41.10%	4,809	58.78%	10	0.12%
1968	2,828	29.86%	3,447	36.40%	3,196	33.75%
1972	5,826	72.24%	2,233	27.69%	6	0.07%
1976	4,172	42.94%	5,499	56.60%	44	0.45%
1980	5,970	52.69%	5,163	45.57%	197	1.74%
1984	8,634	64.32%	4,747	35.36%	42	0.31%
1988	7,858	55.95%	6,128	43.63%	59	0.42%
1992	5,598	38.70%	5,322	36.79%	3,546	24.51%
1996	6,458	48.19%	5,693	42.49%	1,249	9.32%
2000	9,835	65.22%	5,041	33.43%	204	1.35%
2004	11,525	70.70%	4,678	28.70%	98	0.60%
2008	11,884	71.35%	4,630	27.80%	141	0.85%
2012	12,262	75.64%	3,813	23.52%	137	0.85%
2016	13,201	77.76%	3,369	19.84%	407	2.40%
2020	15,110	78.59%	3,955	20.57%	162	0.84%
2024	15,597	80.57%	3,635	18.78%	126	0.65%

United States Senate election results for Anderson County, Texas1
Year	Republican		Democratic		Third party(ies)	
Year	No.	%	No.	%	No.	%
2024	15,022	78.17%	3,872	20.15%	322	1.68%

United States Senate election results for Anderson County, Texas2
Year	Republican		Democratic		Third party(ies)	
Year	No.	%	No.	%	No.	%
2020	14,943	78.35%	3,792	19.88%	337	1.77%

Texas Gubernatorial election results for Anderson County
Year	Republican		Democratic		Third party(ies)	
Year	No.	%	No.	%	No.	%
2022	11,762	81.43%	2,545	17.62%	138	0.96%

== Education ==
These school districts serve areas in Anderson County:

- Athens Independent School District (partial)
- Cayuga Independent School District
- Elkhart Independent School District (partial)
- Frankston Independent School District (partial)
- La Poynor Independent School District (partial)
- Neches Independent School District
- Palestine Independent School District
- Slocum Independent School District
- Westwood Independent School District

== Media ==
Anderson County is part of the Dallas/Fort Worth DMA. Local TV media outlets include: KDFW-TV, KXAS-TV, WFAA-TV, KTVT-TV, KERA-TV, KTXA-TV, KDFI-TV, and KDAF-TV. Other nearby TV stations that provide coverage for Anderson County come from the Tyler/Longview/Jacksonville market and they include: KLTV, KTRE-TV, KYTX-TV, KFXK-TV, and KETK-TV.

Newspapers serving Anderson County include the Palestine Herald-Press in Palestine.

== See also ==
- National Register of Historic Places listings in Anderson County, Texas
- Recorded Texas Historic Landmarks in Anderson County
- East Texas Oil Field
- Category:People from Anderson County, Texas
- List of counties in Texas
