= Palestine Independent School District =

School district in Texas, United States

Location
- Palestine, Texas ESC Region 7 USA

District information
- Type: Public Independent school district
- Grades: EE through 12
- Superintendent: Jason Marshall
- Schools: 6 (2011–12)
- Budget: $35,200,000 (2021-2022)
- NCES District ID: 4834050

Students and staff
- Students: 3360 (2021–22)
- Teachers: 260 (2021–22) (on full-time equivalent (FTE) basis)
- Student–teacher ratio: 13:1 (2021–22)

Other information
- Website: Palestine ISD

Palestine Independent School District is a public school district based in Palestine, Texas, United States, that serves about 3,500 students in central Anderson County.

In 2021, the school district was rated "B" by the Texas Education Agency.

== Schools ==
- Palestine High School (grades 9–12)
- Palestine Junior High (grades 7–8)
- A. M. Story Elementary School (grades 4–6)
- Southside Elementary School (grades 2–3)
- Northside Primary School (kindergarten–grade 1)
- Washington Early Childhood Center (early childhood education, prekindergarten)

== Students ==
=== Ethnicity ===
Students during the 2006–2007 school year:

- Total: 3,405 (100.0%)
- White: 1,311 (38.5%)
- Hispanic: 1,062 (31.2%)
- African American: 996 (29.3%)
- Asian/Pacific Islander: 30 (0.9%)
- Native American: 6 (0.2%)

=== Grade level ===
Students during the 2006–2007 school year:

- Early Childhood Education and Pre-Kindergarten: 181 (5.3%)
- Elementary (K-5): 1,579 (46.4%)
- Middle School (6–8): 720 (21.1%)
- High School (9–12): 925 (27.2%)
- Class of 2006 Graduates: 187

=== Other statistics ===
- Economically Disadvantaged (2006–2007): 65.1% (2,217)
- Annual Dropout Rate, Grades 7–12 (2005–2006): 3.1%
- Average SAT Score (Class of 2006): 1013
- Average ACT Score (Class of 2006): 21.2

== Leadership ==
Palestine ISD is led by a superintendent chosen by a board of trustees.

Board of Trustees

- Ms. Davi Ingram, President
- Mr. Jeffery Schwab, Vice President
- Dr. Michael Garcia, Secretary
- Ms. Shereece Jogie
- Mr. Kurt Herrington
- Mr. Michael Bennett
- Mr. Eddy Hutchinson
