= Cayuga Independent School District =

School district in Texas, United States

Location
- Cayuga, Texas ESC Region 7 USA

District information
- Type: Public Independent school district
- Grades: EE through 12
- Superintendent: Joe E. Satterwhite III (Jes)
- Schools: 3
- NCES District ID: 4813200

Students and staff
- Students: 589 (2023–2024)
- Teachers: 48.73 (on an FTE basis) (2023–2024)
- Staff: 77.97 (on an FTE basis) (2023–2024)
- Student–teacher ratio: 12.09 (2023–2024)

Other information
- Website: www.cayugaisd.com

Cayuga Independent School District is a public school district based in Cayuga, Texas (USA) in unincorporated Anderson County, Texas (USA).

In 2009, the school district was rated "recognized" by the Texas Education Agency.

== Schools ==
Located in northwestern Anderson County, the district has three campuses:

- Cayuga High School (Grades 9-12)
- Cayuga Middle (Grades 6-8)
- Cayuga Elementary (Grades EE-5) (2003 National Blue Ribbon School).
