= Palestine, Texas =

City in Texas

- City
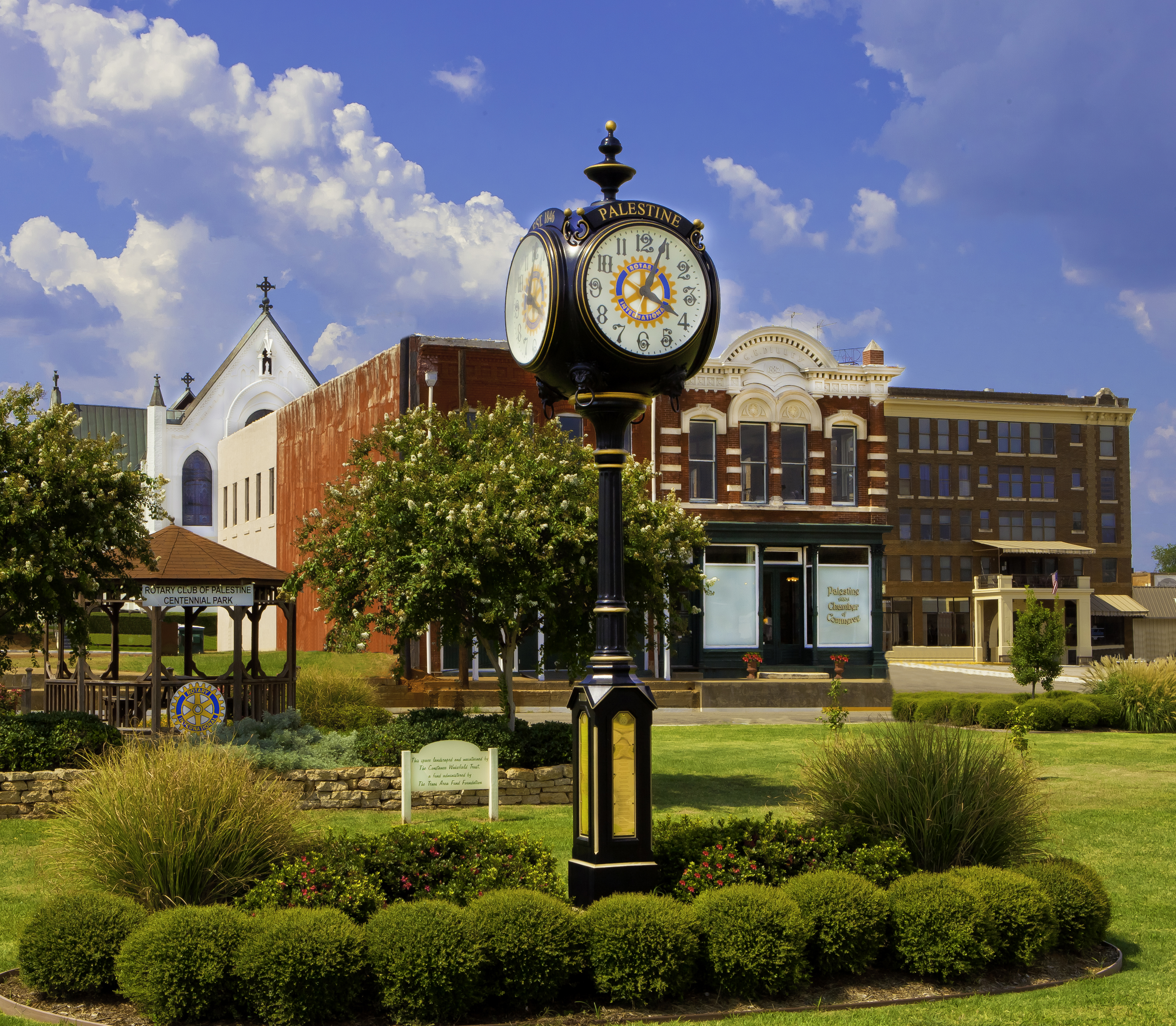
- Downtown Palestine

- Logo

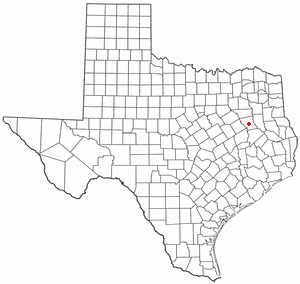
- Location of Palestine, Texas

- Coordinates: 31°45′16″N 95°38′48″W
- Country: United States
- State: Texas
- County: Anderson
- Incorporated: 1846

Government
  - Type: Council–manager

Area
  - Total: 19.63 sq mi (50.83 km^{2})
  - Land: 19.42 sq mi (50.30 km^{2})
  - Water: 0.20 sq mi (0.53 km^{2})
- Elevation: 509 ft (155 m)

Population (2020)
  - Total: 18,544
  - Density: 912.9/sq mi (352.46/km^{2})
- Time zone: UTC-6 (Central (CST))
  - Summer (DST): UTC-5 (CDT)
- ZIP codes: 75801-75803, 75882
- Area codes: 903, 430
- FIPS code: 48-54708
- GNIS feature ID: 2411355
- Website: www.cityofpalestinetx.com

Palestine (/ˈpælɪstiːn/ PAL-ist-een) is a city in and the seat of Anderson County in the U.S. state of Texas. It was named after Palestine, Illinois, by preacher Daniel Parker, who had migrated from that town.

The city had a 2020 U.S. census population of 18,544, making it the sixth-largest incorporated municipality in Northeast Texas by population. Palestine is a relatively small city located in the Piney Woods, equidistant from the major cities of Dallas, Houston, and Shreveport, Louisiana.

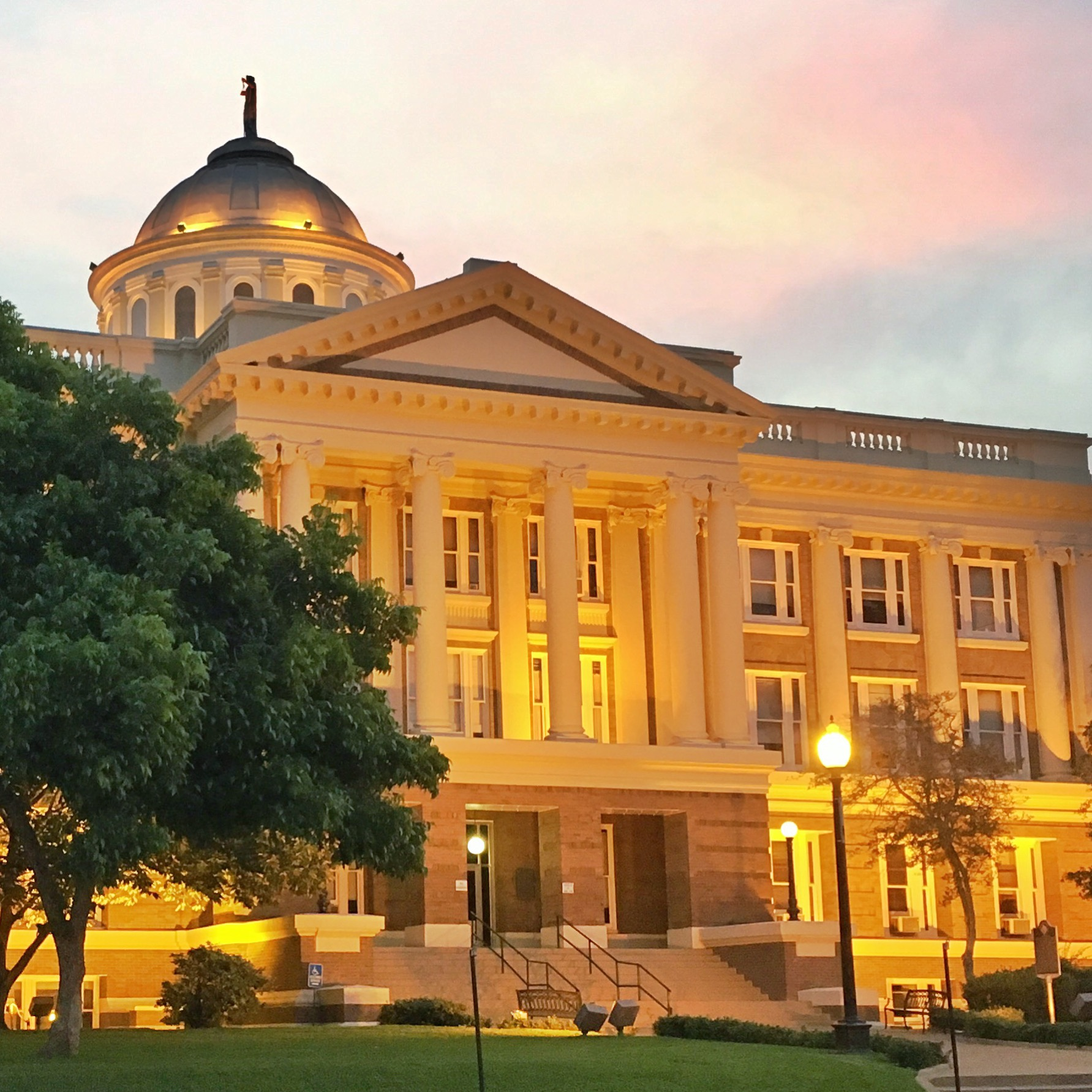
Courthouse in Palestine, Texas

It is notable for its natural environment, and has a notable dogwood blooming season. It has 23 historical sites on the National Register of Historic Places, and was the western terminus of the historic Texas State Railroad. Today, this steam-and-diesel railroad museum operates tourist trains between Palestine and Rusk.

== History ==
Indigenous groups, such as the Coushatta Tribe, occupied this area for thousands of years before European encounter. During the years of Spanish and Mexican control of major parts of the Southwest, what became East Texas was lightly settled by Europeans.

=== Founding ===
A trading post was established by Anglo-Americans circa 1843, and some settlers gathered around it. In 1846, the Texas Legislature incorporated Palestine to serve as a seat for the newly established Anderson County. James R. Fulton, Johnston Shelton, and William Bigelow were hired by the first Anderson County commissioners to survey the surrounding land and lay out a town site. This consisted of a central courthouse square and the surrounding 24 blocks.

The city was named after Palestine, Illinois, as suggested by Micham Main and or Daniel Parker, a minister of Pilgrim Church who had migrated with the Main family and numerous other settlers from that town.

By 1858, Palestine had grown to a population of about 2,000. An 1861 state almanac showed that the city was connected to the rest of Texas by a thrice-weekly stagecoach that served Huntsville, Crockett, and Nacogdoches. In 1861, a joint resolution called for the construction of the Metropolitan Railroad from Texarkana to Austin, passing through Palestine, Henderson, and Fairfield. These plans were interrupted when the American Civil War broke out.

A book burning took place in Palestine shortly before the Civil War. The town government passed a resolution to examine textbooks to ensure they were supportive of slavery, to prohibit northerners from teaching, and to discourage local merchants from doing business with northerners who did not support slavery. The next day, a vigilance committee destroyed textbooks that they considered an antislavery conspiracy.

In the postwar period, during the Reconstruction era, the timber trade and town growth were stimulated in the 1870s by the construction of a railroad through there. The city had a population of more than 10,000 by 1898.

=== Railroad ===
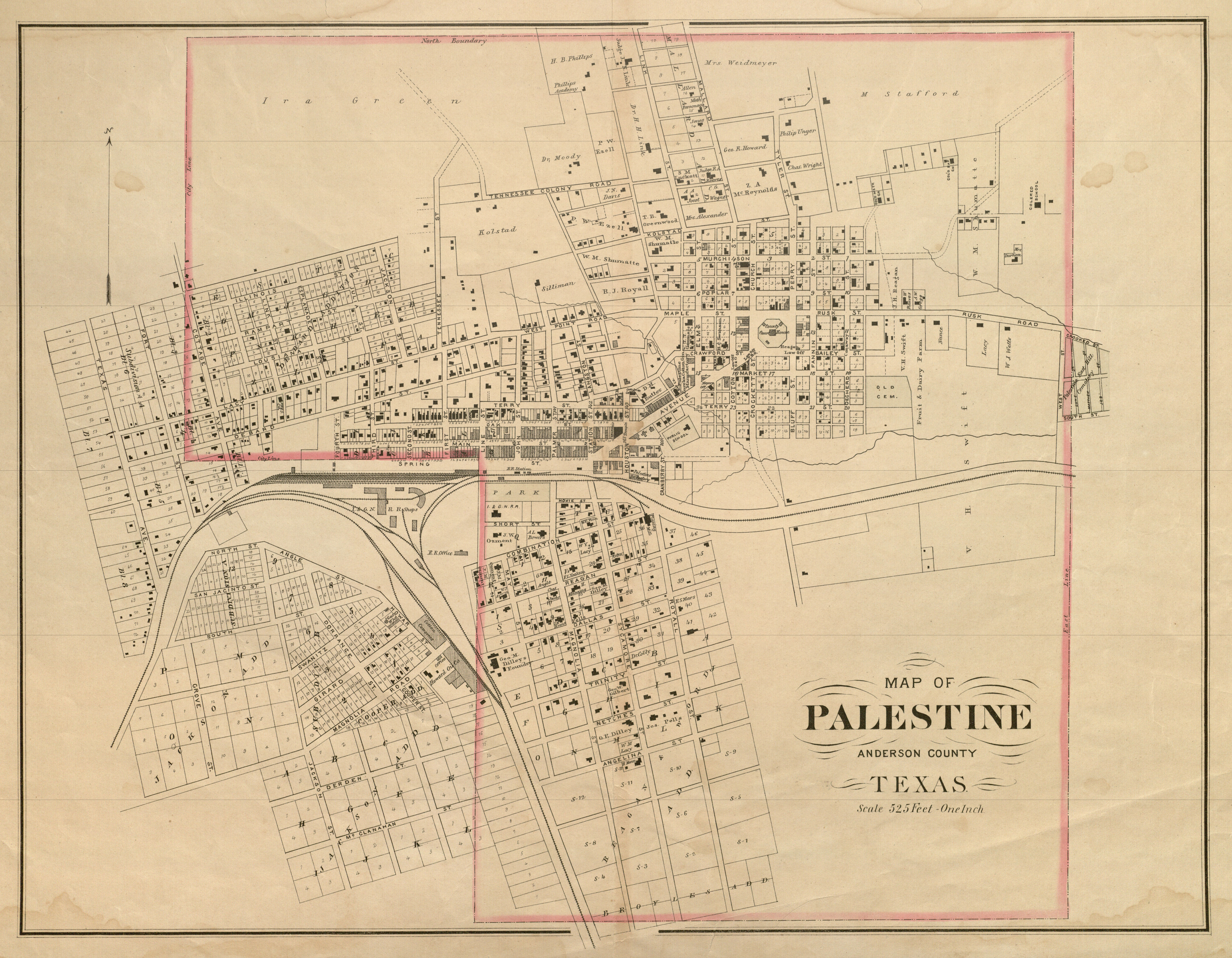
Map of Palestine, circa 1885

The International Railroad and the Houston and Great Northern Railroad first connected Palestine to the city of Hearne in 1872. Later that year, it was connected northeast to Longview. The railroad merged in 1873 to become the International and Great Northern Railroad (IGN).

The IGN later became part of the Missouri Pacific Railroad, and ultimately, the Union Pacific Railroad. In 1875, IGN president H.M. Hoxie moved to Palestine and built the first Victorian mansion there. Successful merchant owners and railroad executives built other elaborate homes along South Sycamore Street.

The IGN built a major depot in 1892 and a modern passenger coach shop in 1902, making Palestine an important locomotive and coach location. These shops continued to operate until 1954. At that time, the present facility was built, which is exclusively for freight-car repair.

Today, the Palestine Car Shop is one of only two car shops on the Union Pacific Railroad that perform major modifications and repairs to freight cars. The Palestine UP workforce has more than 100 employees.

After the state completed the Rusk Penitentiary near the city of Rusk, the state leased convict labor to the railroad as workers. The railroad originally transported raw materials to the iron smelter located at the Rusk Penitentiary. In 1906, the line reached Maydelle, and by 1909, the line was completed when it reached Palestine.

Regularly scheduled train service ceased in 1921. The line was leased to various railroad companies until 1969, when they abandoned it during national restructuring of the industry. The Texas Legislature adapted the railroad as a state park in 1972, to be devoted to operating trains that showed some of the state's railroad history.

The Texas State Railroad is a state park that allows visitors to ride trains pulled by diesel and steam locomotives between the park's Victorian-style depots and through the forests of East Texas. This short railroad line dates to 1883.

=== Modern era ===
The Slocum massacre was a mass killing of Black residents by white mobs on July 29–30, 1910, in Slocum, an unincorporated community in Anderson County near Palestine in East Texas. The death toll reported by major newspapers ranged between eight and 22, but evidence suggests as many as 200 African Americans were killed.

In 1914, the county's fourth courthouse was completed; it is still in use. One of the many historical sites is Sacred Heart Catholic Church, which was designed by Nicholas J. Clayton.

In 1928, oil was discovered at Boggy Creek, east of Palestine. The production of oil resources added to and diversified the town's economy. Palestine became a center for oil-well servicing and supplies in support of other producing fields found later elsewhere in Anderson County.

Construction of the earth-filled Blackburn Crossing Dam on the Upper Neches River, creating Lake Palestine as a reliable source of water, was begun in 1960 and completed in 1962. A municipal water authority manages this resource. The dam was enlarged from 1969 to 1972 to 75 feet high, and 5,720 feet long.

Debris from the 2003 Space Shuttle Columbia disaster was found in and near Palestine and other East Texas towns. Palestine's NASA Columbia Scientific Balloon Facility (renamed in honor of the shuttle crew), has flown 1,700 high-altitude balloons for universities and research agencies.

On November 15, 2015, a mass shooting took place at a campsite several miles northwest of Palestine. Six people were killed by an intoxicated neighbor (who was armed with a .22-caliber revolver and a .45-caliber revolver) who was upset about losing his family's land. The shooter, 33-year-old William Mitchell Hudson, was charged with capital murder. He was convicted and sentenced to death by a Brazos County jury on November 15, 2017.

== Geography ==
Palestine is located near the center of Anderson County. Several numbered highways converge on the city, including U.S. Highways 79, 84, and 287, plus Texas State highways 19 and 155. Dallas is 110 miles (180 km) to the northwest, and Houston is 150 miles (240 km) to the south. Tyler is 47 miles (76 km) to the northeast.

According to the United States Census Bureau, the city has a total area of 19.6 square miles (50.7 km^{2}), of which 0.19 sq mi (0.5 km^{2}), or 1.06%, is covered by water.

=== Lake Palestine ===
Lake Palestine is a freshwater lake created in 1962 by the construction of the Blackburn Crossing dam on the Neches River. A 25,600-acre lake with a total length of 18 miles, 135 miles of shoreline, and an average depth of 16.25 ft, it offers an array of freshwater fish species, including largemouth bass, white crappie, and catfish. The Upper Neches River Municipal Water Authority owns and operates Lake Palestine.

The City of Palestine has a water contract for 25 million gallons of water per day. It is served by a channel dam, 13 miles of pipeline, and a water treatment plant, which the city operates for water coming into the city.

=== Climate ===
Palestine has a humid subtropical climate (Köppen: Cfa) with long, hot summers and short, mild winters. The average warmest month is July; the highest recorded temperature was 109 °F (43 °C) on September 4, 2000. On average, the coolest month is January, and the lowest recorded temperature was −1 °F (−18 °C) on December 23, 1989. The maximum average precipitation occurs in June.

Climate data for Palestine, Texas (1991–2020 normals, extremes 1984–present)
Month	Jan	Feb	Mar	Apr	May	Jun	Jul	Aug	Sep	Oct	Nov	Dec	Year
Record high °F (°C)	82 (28)	92 (33)	90 (32)	92 (33)	99 (37)	103 (39)	107 (42)	107 (42)	109 (43)	96 (36)	88 (31)	84 (29)	109 (43)
Mean maximum °F (°C)	75.3 (24.1)	79.0 (26.1)	83.4 (28.6)	86.2 (30.1)	91.0 (32.8)	94.6 (34.8)	98.6 (37.0)	100.1 (37.8)	96.2 (35.7)	90.4 (32.4)	82.3 (27.9)	77.0 (25.0)	100.5 (38.1)
Mean daily maximum °F (°C)	58.9 (14.9)	62.7 (17.1)	70.1 (21.2)	76.9 (24.9)	83.6 (28.7)	89.9 (32.2)	93.9 (34.4)	94.7 (34.8)	89.0 (31.7)	79.9 (26.6)	68.1 (20.1)	60.4 (15.8)	77.3 (25.2)
Daily mean °F (°C)	47.0 (8.3)	50.8 (10.4)	57.7 (14.3)	64.7 (18.2)	72.8 (22.7)	79.6 (26.4)	83.1 (28.4)	83.0 (28.3)	76.9 (24.9)	67.1 (19.5)	55.8 (13.2)	48.6 (9.2)	65.6 (18.7)
Mean daily minimum °F (°C)	35.2 (1.8)	38.9 (3.8)	45.3 (7.4)	52.5 (11.4)	62.1 (16.7)	69.3 (20.7)	72.3 (22.4)	71.3 (21.8)	64.8 (18.2)	54.2 (12.3)	43.6 (6.4)	36.8 (2.7)	53.9 (12.2)
Mean minimum °F (°C)	20.1 (−6.6)	24.7 (−4.1)	27.8 (−2.3)	36.4 (2.4)	47.8 (8.8)	60.0 (15.6)	66.5 (19.2)	64.8 (18.2)	51.6 (10.9)	38.3 (3.5)	27.2 (−2.7)	23.1 (−4.9)	17.9 (−7.8)
Record low °F (°C)	9 (−13)	0 (−18)	16 (−9)	28 (−2)	37 (3)	48 (9)	58 (14)	53 (12)	40 (4)	27 (−3)	18 (−8)	−1 (−18)	−1 (−18)
Average precipitation inches (mm)	4.05 (103)	3.87 (98)	4.11 (104)	4.13 (105)	4.32 (110)	4.50 (114)	2.57 (65)	3.66 (93)	3.31 (84)	4.23 (107)	3.85 (98)	4.20 (107)	46.80 (1,189)
Average snowfall inches (cm)	0.0 (0.0)	0.1 (0.25)	0.0 (0.0)	0.0 (0.0)	0.0 (0.0)	0.0 (0.0)	0.0 (0.0)	0.0 (0.0)	0.0 (0.0)	0.0 (0.0)	0.0 (0.0)	0.0 (0.0)	0.1 (0.25)
Average precipitation days (≥ 0.01 in)	9.9	10.0	10.2	8.8	9.3	8.5	6.6	6.1	7.5	7.1	9.2	9.6	102.8
Average snowy days (≥ 0.1 in)	0.0	0.1	0.0	0.0	0.0	0.0	0.0	0.0	0.0	0.0	0.0	0.0	0.1
Source: NOAA

== Demographics ==
Historical population
Census	Pop.	Note	%±
1850	2,000		—
1860	1,938		−3.1%
1870	2,311		19.2%
1880	2,997		29.7%
1890	5,838		94.8%
1900	8,297		42.1%
1910	10,482		26.3%
1920	11,039		5.3%
1930	11,445		3.7%
1940	12,144		6.1%
1950	12,503		3.0%
1960	13,974		11.8%
1970	14,525		3.9%
1980	15,948		9.8%
1990	18,042		13.1%
2000	17,598		−2.5%
2010	18,712		6.3%
2020	18,544		−0.9%
U.S. Decennial Census

At the 1850 United States census, Palestine had a population around 2,000; a decade later, its population declined to 1,938, yet has since increased in population since to a historic 18,712 at the 2010 U.S. census. As of the 2020 census, 18,544 people lived in the city.

=== Racial and ethnic composition ===
Palestine city, Texas – racial and ethnic composition Note: the US Census treats Hispanic/Latino as an ethnic category. This table excludes Latinos from the racial categories and assigns them to a separate category. Hispanics/Latinos may be of any race.
Race / ethnicity (NH = Non-Hispanic)	Pop 2000	Pop 2010	Pop 2020	% 2000	% 2010	% 2020
White alone (NH)	10,292	9,780	8,450	58.48%	52.27%	45.57%
Black or African American alone (NH)	4,330	4,297	4,439	24.61%	22.96%	23.94%
Native American or Alaska Native alone (NH)	47	64	69	0.27%	0.34%	0.37%
Asian alone (NH)	139	162	166	0.79%	0.87%	0.90%
Native Hawaiian or Pacific Islander alone (NH)	7	11	6	0.04%	0.06%	0.03%
Other race alone (NH)	7	25	56	0.04%	0.13%	0.30%
Mixed-race or multiracial (NH)	157	272	598	0.89%	1.45%	3.22%
Hispanic or Latino (any race)	2,619	4,101	4,760	14.88%	21.92%	25.67%
Total	17,598	18,712	18,544	100.00%	100.00%	100.00%

=== 2020 census ===
As of the 2020 census, the median age was 36.5 years; 26.2% of the residents were under 18 and 17.7% were 65 or older. For every 100 females, there were 90.0 males, and for every 100 females 18 and over, there were 83.7 males 18 and over.

About 97.6% of residents lived in urban areas, while 2.4% lived in rural areas.

Of thee 6,945 households in Palestine, 36.2% had children under 18 living in them, 40.9% were married-couple households, 16.8% were households with a male householder and no spouse or partner present, and 36.4% were households with a female householder and no spouse or partner present. About 29.3% of all households were made up of individuals, and 13.6% had someone living alone who was 65 or older.

The city had were 7,733 housing units, of which 10.2% were vacant. The homeowner vacancy rate was 2.3% and the rental vacancy rate was 8.7%.

Racial composition as of the 2020 census
Race	Number	Percentage
White	9,440	50.9%
Black or African American	4,530	24.4%
American Indian and Alaska Native	160	0.9%
Asian	173	0.9%
Native Hawaiian and other Pacific Islander	6	0.0%
Some other race	2,451	13.2%
Two or more races	1,784	9.6%

As the city's population has grown despite interval declines from 1990 to 2020, its racial and ethnic makeup continues to be dominated by non-Hispanic or non-Latino Whites and Black or African Americans according to official census records.

Palestine racial composition as of 2020 (NH = Non-Hispanic) (Note: Note: the US Census treats Hispanic/Latino as an ethnic category. This table excludes Latinos from the racial categories and assigns them to a separate category. Hispanics/Latinos can be of any race.)
Race	Number	Percentage
White (NH)	8,450	45.56%
Black or African American (NH)	4,439	23.93%
Native American or Alaska Native (NH)	69	0.37%
Asian (NH)	166	0.9%
Pacific Islander (NH)	6	0.03%
Some other race (NH)	56	0.3%
Multiracial (NH)	598	3.22%
Hispanic or Latino	4,760	25.67%
Total	18,544	

=== 2000 census ===
In 2000, the racial and ethnic makeup was 64.60% White, 24.77% African American, 0.49% Native American, 0.79% Asian, 0.07% Pacific Islander, 7.90% from other races, and 1.37% from two or more races. Hispanics or Latino Americans of any race were 14.88% of the population.

In 2000, of 6,641 households, 34.9% had children under 18 living with them, 47.2% were married couples living together, 18.0% had a female householder with no husband present, and 31.0% were not families. About 28.0% of all households were made up of individuals, and 13.7% had someone living alone who was 65 or older. The average household size was 2.57 and the average family size was 3.13.

At the 2000 U.S. census, the median income for a household in the city was $30,497, and for a family was $36,806. Males had a median income of $28,331 versus $20,662 for females. The per capita income for the city was $15,514. About 16.6% of families and 20.7% of the population were below the poverty line, including 27.7% of those under age 18 and 14.6% of those age 65 or over.

=== 2020 American Community Survey estimates ===
Since the 2020 census, the median household income increased to $40,684 and households were paid a median of $817 a month.

== Economy ==
Typical of many rural American communities, Palestine's economy is stimulated by small businesses and local chains from national and international retailers. The largest employer is the Texas Department of Criminal Justice, which employs more than 3,900. Other significant employers include a thriving medical and healthcare sector that tends to the large population of retirees.

== Government ==
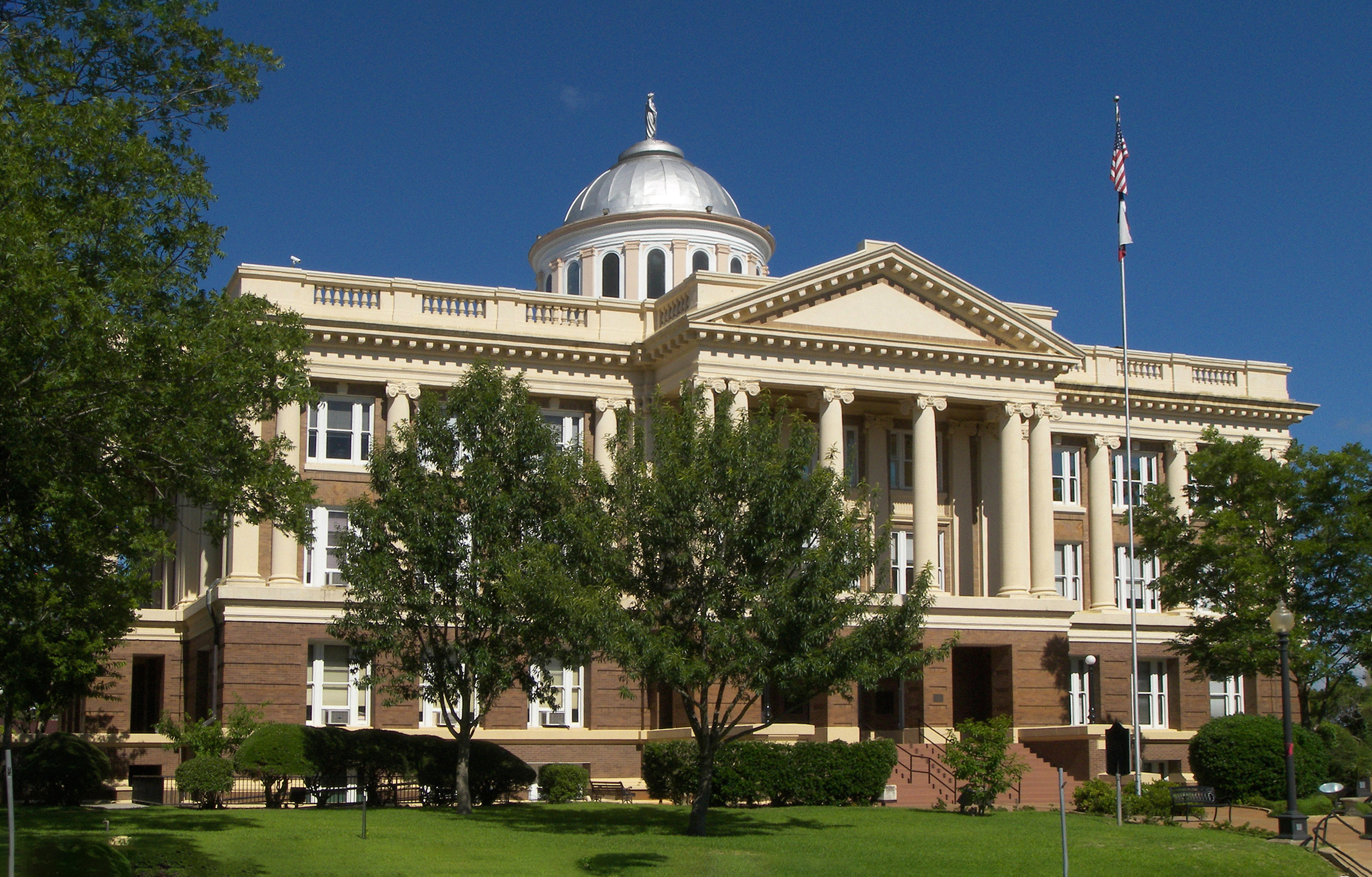
The Anderson County Courthouse in Palestine was designated a Recorded Texas Historic Landmark in 1988 and listed on the National Register of Historic Places on September 28, 1992.

=== Local government ===
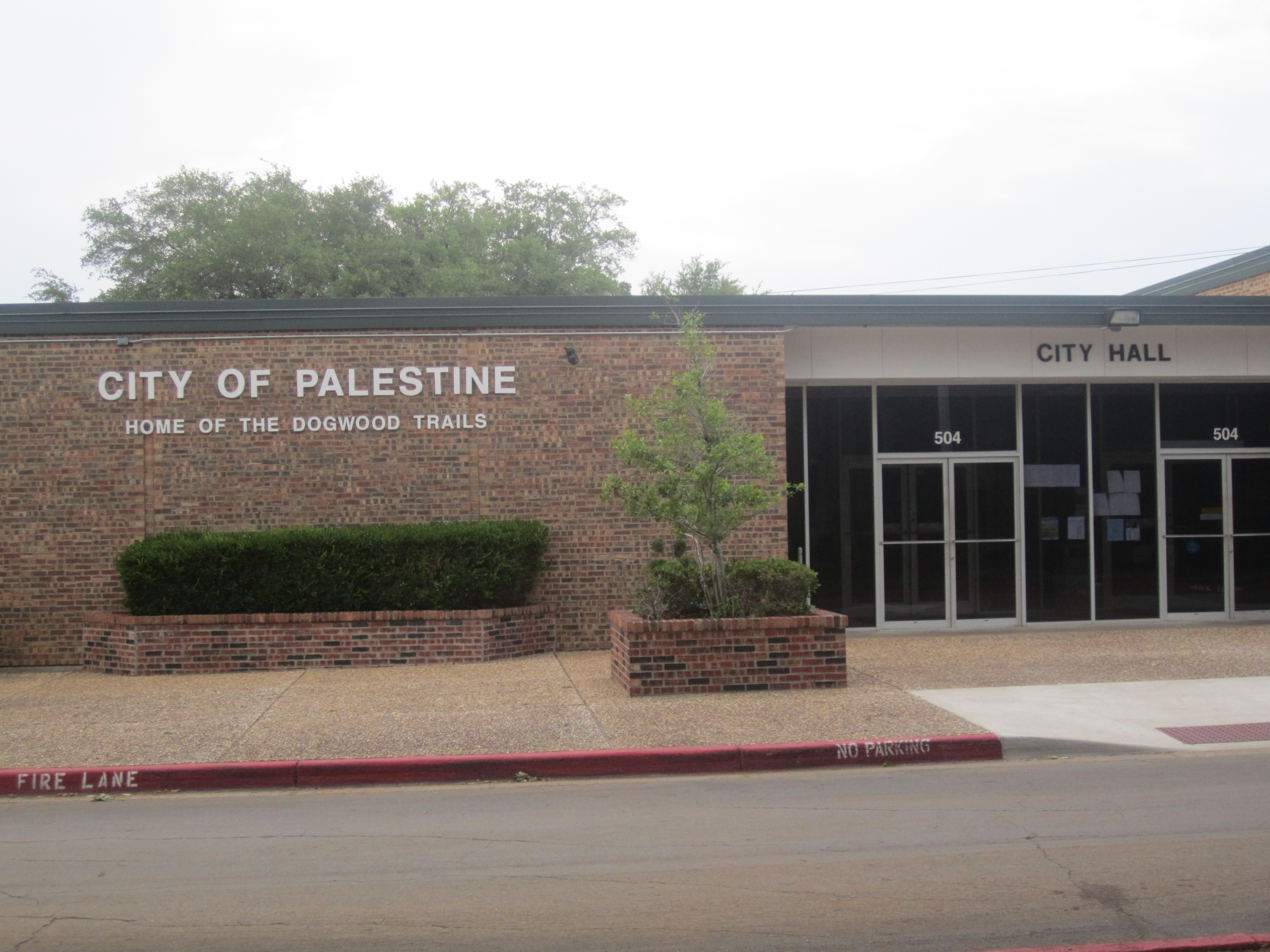
City hall

According to the city's 2016 audited Annual Financial Report, the city's general fund had $13.1 million in revenues, $14.6 million in expenditures, $3.1 million in total assets, $0.4 million in total liabilities, and $6.7 million in cash and investments across all funds. In addition to the city's general fund, the water treatment plant provides potable water to residents. It operates 24 hours per day, 7 days per week, treating and pumping an average of 3 million gallons of water per day between Lake Palestine and city residents. The water-distribution system employs 26 lift stations and about 275 miles of water lines; wastewater involves roughly 250 miles of sanitary sewer lines.

The current Anderson County Courthouse in Palestine is the fourth building to serve this purpose. C. H. Page and Brothers designed this Renaissance Revival brick courthouse, which opened in 1914. Located in downtown Palestine between Fannin and Dechard Streets, it was remodeled in the 1980s.

=== State government ===
Palestine is represented in the Texas Senate by Republican Robert Nichols, District 3, and in the Texas House of Representatives by Republican Cody Harris, District 8.

=== National government ===
At the national level, the two U.S. senators from Texas are Republicans John Cornyn and Ted Cruz; Palestine is part of Texas' US Congressional 5th District, currently represented by Republican Lance Gooden.

== Education ==
=== Public school districts ===
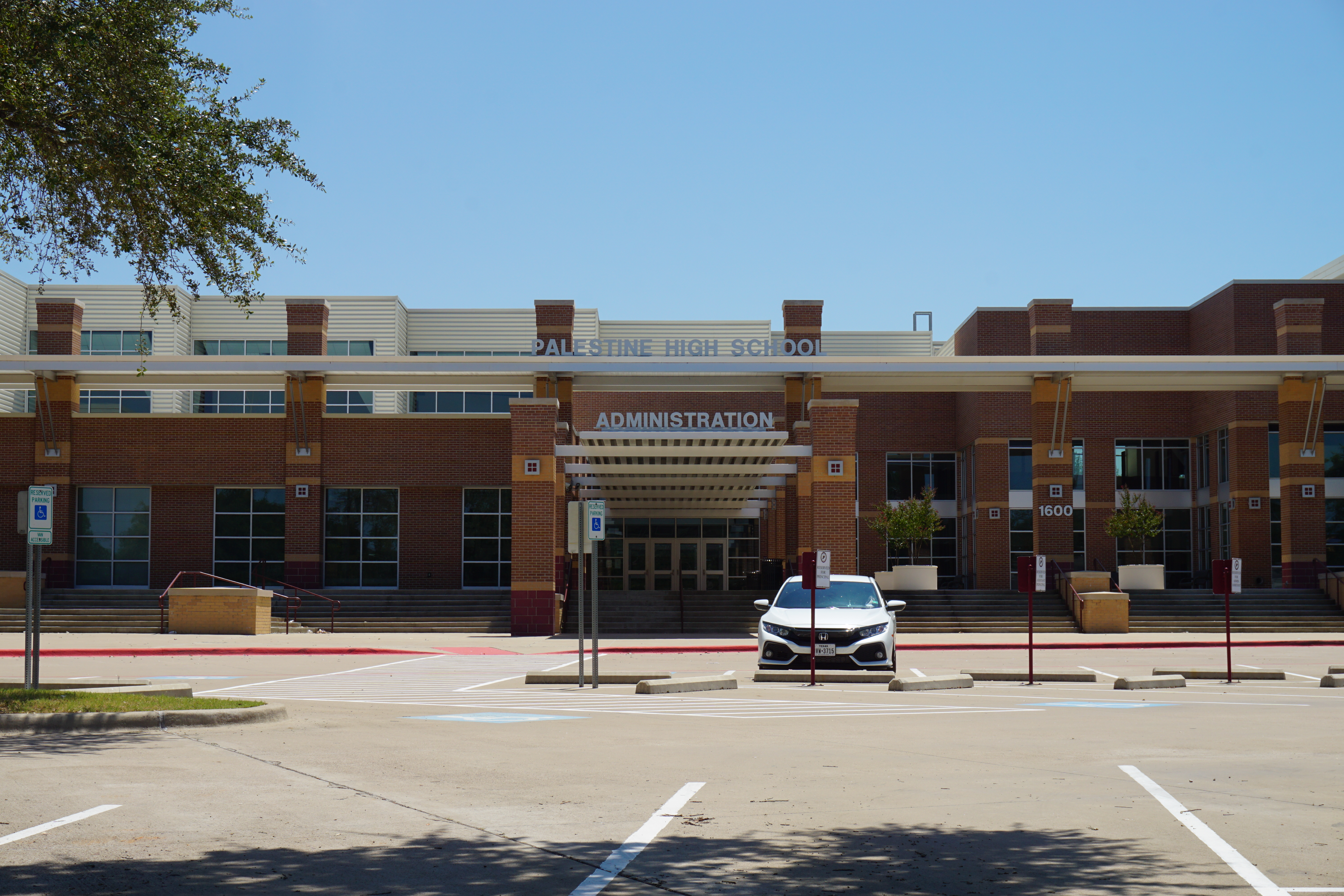
Palestine High School

With almost 3,500 students, the Palestine Independent School District is the largest school district in Palestine. The district comprises:

- Palestine High School, grades 9–12
- Palestine Junior High, grades 7–8
- A. M. Story Elementary, grades 4–6
- Southside Primary, grades 2–3
- Northside Early Childhood Center, pre-kindergarten–grade 1

Located on the western edge of the city, the Westwood Independent School District is home to around 1,700 students. It consists of a primary, elementary, junior high, and high school campuses.

Westwood Independent School District

- Westwood High School, grades 9–12
- Westwood Junior High, grades 7–8
- Westwood Elementary, grades 3–6
- Westwood Primary, grades kindergarten–grade 2

=== Charter schools ===
University Academy, a charter school operated by the University of Texas at Tyler, began in 2012 with grades 3–6, expanding upward to grades 7–12 at the rate of one grade per year. In March 2018, the school had 188 students enrolled, and planned to grow to 600 students. On March 19, 2018, the university announced it would upgrade the University Academy school building at a cost of $650,000.

A small portion of remote area of the city is also within the Elkhart Independent School District.

=== Colleges and universities ===
Trinity Valley Community College operates TVCC-Palestine just north of the city limits at the intersection of US 287 and State Highway 19. In addition to offering academic transfer courses, the Palestine campus offers vocational-technical programs in vocational nursing, cosmetology, mid-management, computer science, criminal justice, business and office technology, fire science, legal assistant, emergency medical technician, and paramedic programs, and also trains correctional officers for the Texas Department of Criminal Justice. Continuing education and adult education courses are also offered.

The University of Texas at Tyler also operates a campus in the city. A new, $9.6 million, 50-acre (200,000 m^{2}) campus opened in 2010, fall semester. The UT-Tyler Palestine Campus offers courses in nursing.

== Media ==
Palestine is served by the daily Palestine Herald-Press, founded in 1849 as the Palestine Advocate, now owned by Community Newspaper Holdings.

The city is served by the Tyler television broadcast market. The nearest television transmitter to the city is KETK-TV (NBC) located 30 miles away at Mt. Selman. Likewise, most radio stations serving Palestine originate from Tyler, Jacksonville, or Henderson.

Wired internet for the city is primarily provided by Suddenlink and CenturyLink, with Windstream serving rural areas formerly operated by Valor Telecom. In the 2000s, Comcast and AT&T provided DSL service before withdrawing from the local market.

== Transportation ==
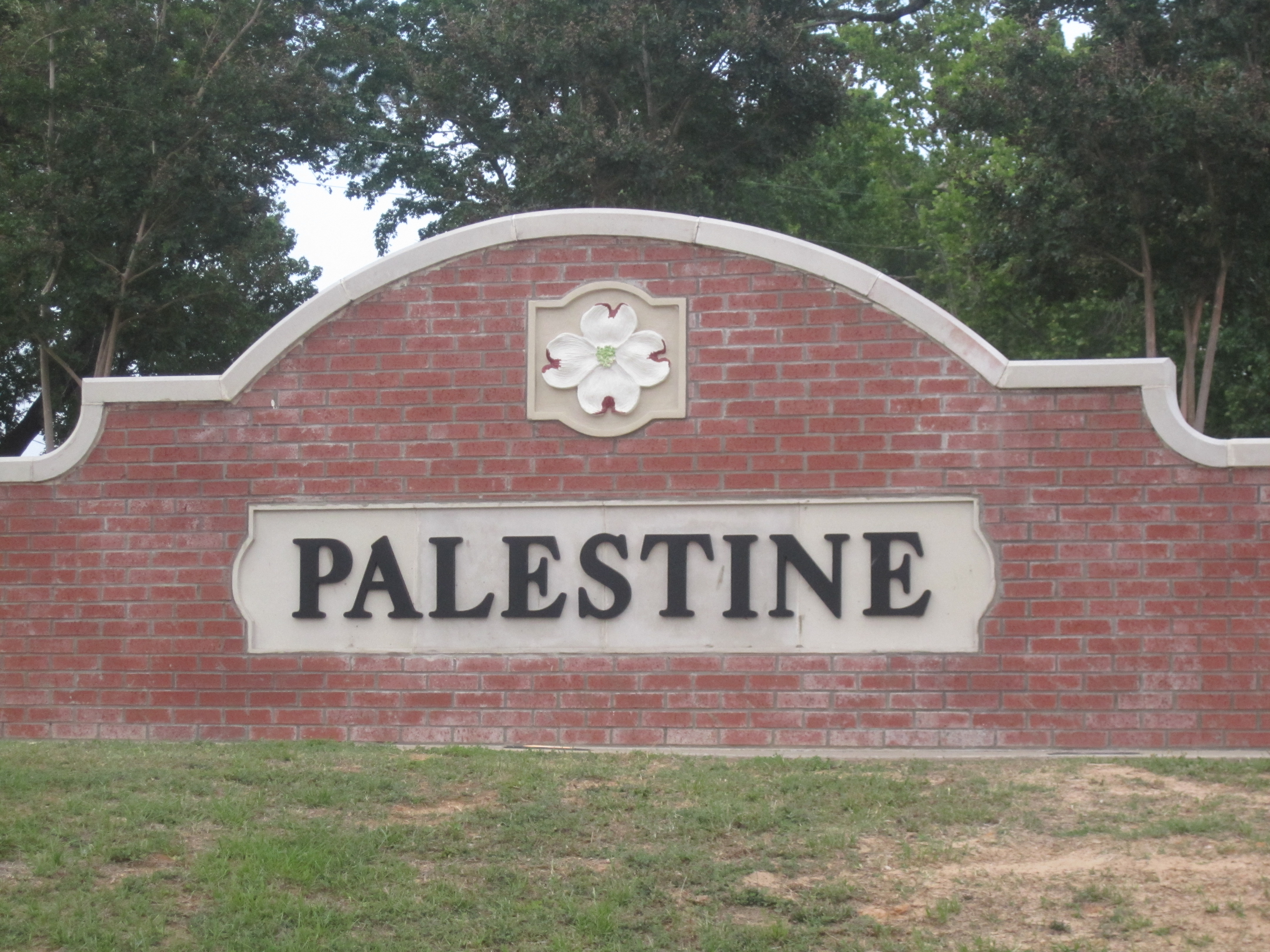
Palestine welcome sign off U.S. Route 79

Palestine is at a crossroads of several arterial highways:

- U.S. Highway 79 from Austin to the southwest and continues on to Louisiana, Arkansas, Tennessee and Kentucky to the northeast
- U.S. Highway 84 from Colorado via New Mexico and Waco to the west and continues on to Louisiana, Mississippi, Alabama and Georgia to the east
- U.S. Highway 287 from Beaumont and Port Arthur to the southeast and continues on to Fort Worth and Oklahoma, Colorado, Wyoming and Montana to the northwest
- State Highway 19 from Huntsville to the South and continues on to Athens and Paris
- State Highway 155 emanating from Palestine northeast to Tyler
- Loop 127 is entirely within Palestine
- Loop 256 encircles downtown Palestine

=== Airport ===
Palestine is served by the general aviation Palestine Municipal Airport, located on the northwest edge of the city. Activated in 1942, its FAA identifier is PSN. Its runway 18/36 has a length of 5005 ft, and crosswind runway 9/27 has a length of 4002 ft. It is home to 31 airplanes, mostly single-engined, and is owned and operated by the city. Palestine was served by Trans-Texas Airlines (later known as Texas International Airlines) during the 1940s and 1950s using Douglas DC-3 aircraft. One afternoon flight arrived from Dallas and Tyler continuing on to Lufkin, Beaumont, and Houston, while another aircraft stopped through going the other way. The service was discontinued between 1952 and 1954.

== Notable people ==
- Aaron Aryanpur (b. 1977) - stand-up comedian
- Smith Ballew (1902–1984) - actor, sophisticated singer, orchestra leader, and western singing star
- Steven L. Bennett - Vietnam War (1946–1972) United States Air Force pilot who posthumously received the Medal of Honor
- Blacktop Mojo - rock band from Palestine
- Elton Bomer (b. 1935) - politician who served as state representative and Texas secretary of state
- Bill Bradley (b. 1947) - former American football coach
- Guy Brown (b. 1955) - former NFL linebacker for the Dallas Cowboys
- Ivory Lee Brown (b. 1969) - former NFL running back for Arizona Cardinals
- Thomas M. Campbell (1856–1923) - 24th governor of Texas
- Russ Cotton (1915–2009) - NFL quarterback for the Pittsburgh Steelers
- Keith Crawford (b. 1970) - former NFL cornerback for Green Bay Packers
- Oscar Dugey (1887–1966) - MLB second baseman for the 1915 NL Champion Philadelphia Phillies
- Sandra Glover (b. 1968) - former track and field athlete
- Dick H. Guinn (1918–1980) - United States Navy vice admiral and Navy Cross recipient
- James I. Hopkins, Jr. (1918-1951) - United States Air Force lieutenant colonel who authorized the bombing of Hiroshima
- Ben Howard (1904–1970) - aviator and aeronautical engineer
- Jack Pepper (1902–1979) - vaudeville dancer, singer, comedian, musician, and later in life a nightclub manager
- Adrian Peterson (b. 1985) - NFL running back, known for his years with the Minnesota Vikings, 2012 MVP
- John H. Reagan (1818–1905) - US congressman before and after the Civil War, and US senator after the war
- James Saxton (1940–2014) - All-American NFL halfback for the Dallas Texans
- Tye Sheridan (b. 1996) - actor and producer
- Todd Staples (b. 1963) - Texas commissioner of agriculture and former member of both houses of the Texas State Legislature
- Gene Watson (b. 1943) - country music singer, famous for his 1975 hit "Love in the Hot Afternoon"
- Alliene Brandon Webb (1910–1965) - composer, singer, and teacher
- Whiskey Myers - Southern rock/country band
