= List of unincorporated communities in Texas =

This is a list of unincorporated communities in the U.S. state of Texas, listed by county. This may include disincorporated communities, towns with no incorporated status, ghost towns, or census-designated places.

County
- A
- B
- C
- D
- E
- F
- G
- H
- I
- J
- K
- L
- M
- N
- O
- P
- Q
- R
- S
- T
- U
- V
- W
- X
- Y
- Z

Community	County	Population	Notes/Refs
Alderbranch	Anderson		
Zaferdeniz	Anderson		
Blackfoot	Anderson		
Bois d'Arc	Anderson		
Bradford	Anderson		
Broom City	Anderson		
Brushy Creek	Anderson		
Cayuga	Anderson		
Cedar Creek	Anderson		
Cronin	Anderson		
Crystal Lake	Anderson		
Days Chapel	Anderson		
Denson Springs	Anderson		
Elmtown	Anderson		
Elmwood	Anderson		
Fosterville	Anderson		
Greens Bluff	Anderson		
Long Lake	Anderson		
Massey Lake	Anderson		
Montalba	Anderson		
Mound City	Anderson		
Myrtle Springs	Anderson		
Neches	Anderson		
Pert	Anderson		
Providence	Anderson		
Redtown	Anderson		
Salmon	Anderson		
Slocum	Anderson		
Springfield	Anderson		
Swanson Hill Church	Anderson		
Tennessee Colony	Anderson		
Todd City	Anderson		
Tucker	Anderson		
Wells Creek	Anderson		
Yard	Anderson		
Florey	Andrews		
Frankel City	Andrews		
McKinney Acres	Andrews		
Shafter Lake	Andrews		
Herty	Angelina		
Homer	Angelina		
Oak Flat	Angelina		
Pollok	Angelina		
Redland	Angelina		
Holiday Beach	Aransas		
Lamar	Aransas		
Dundee	Archer		
Huff	Archer		
Mankins	Archer		
Washburn	Armstrong		
Goodnight	Armstrong		
Wayside	Armstrong		
Amphion	Atascosa		
Campbellton	Atascosa		
Leming	Atascosa		
Peggy	Atascosa		
McCoy	Atascosa		
Bleiblerville	Austin		
Cat Spring	Austin		
Kenney	Austin		
New Ulm	Austin		
Shelby	Austin		
Bula	Bailey		
Enochs	Bailey		
Virginia City	Bailey		
Maple	Bailey		
Needmore	Bailey		
Bandera Falls	Bandera		
Lake Medina Shores	Bandera		
Lakehills	Bandera		
Pipe Creek	Bandera		
Tarpley	Bandera		
Vanderpool	Bandera		
Medina	Bandera		
Alum Creek	Bastrop		
Bateman	Bastrop		
Butler	Bastrop		
Camp Swift	Bastrop		
Cedar Creek	Bastrop		
Circle D-KC Estates	Bastrop		
Colorado	Bastrop		
Jeddo	Bastrop		
Jorden	Bastrop		
Kovar	Bastrop		
McDade	Bastrop		
Paige	Bastrop		
Pettytown	Bastrop		
Red Rock	Bastrop		
Rockne	Bastrop		
Rosanky	Bastrop		
Togo	Bastrop		
Upton	Bastrop		
Utley	Bastrop		
Wyldwood	Bastrop		
Mabelle	Baylor		
Red Springs	Baylor		
Blue Berry Hill	Bee		
Mineral	Bee		
Normanna	Bee		
Pawnee	Bee		
Pettus	Bee		
Skidmore	Bee		
Tuleta	Bee		
Tulsita	Bee		
Tynan	Bee		
Cyclone	Bell		
Ding Dong	Bell		
Fort Cavazos	Bell		Formerly Fort Hood
Heidenheimer	Bell		
Pendleton	Bell		
Prairie Dell	Bell		
White Hall	Bell		
Adkins	Bexar		
Atascosa	Bexar		
Cross Mountain	Bexar		
Lackland Air Force Base	Bexar		
Leon Springs	Bexar		
Macdona	Bexar		
Randolph Air Force Base	Bexar		
Sayers	Bexar		
Scenic Oaks	Bexar		
Timberwood Park	Bexar		
Wetmore	Bexar		
Hye	Blanco		
Gail	Borden	231 (2010)	County Seat
Mesquite	Borden		
Kopperl	Bosque		
Laguna Park	Bosque		
Mosheim	Bosque		
Womack	Bosque		
Boston	Bowie	200 (2000)	County Seat
Dalby Springs	Bowie		
Friendship Village	Bowie		
Hubbard	Bowie		
Malta	Bowie		
Simms	Bowie		
South Texarkana	Bowie		
Friendship	Bowie		
Amsterdam	Brazoria		
Chocolate Bayou	Brazoria		
Damon	Brazoria		
Danciger	Brazoria		
Lochridge	Brazoria		
Old Ocean	Brazoria		
Otey	Brazoria		
Rosharon	Brazoria		
Sandy Point	Brazoria		
Turtle Cove	Brazoria		
Wild Peach Village	Brazoria		
Lake Bryan	Brazos		
Wellborn	Brazos		
Lajitas	Brewster	75 (2010)	Single owner/Primarily tourist location
Marathon	Brewster		
Study Butte	Brewster		
Terlingua	Brewster		
Airport Road Addition	Brooks		
Cantu Addition	Brooks		
Encino	Brooks		
Flowella	Brooks		
Rachal	Brooks		
Brookesmith	Brown		
Lake Brownwood	Brown		
May	Brown		
Thunderbird Bay	Brown		
Winchell	Brown		
Zephyr	Brown		
Birch	Burleson		
Chriesman	Burleson		
Clay	Burleson		
Cooks Point	Burleson		
Davidson	Burleson		
Deanville	Burleson		
Frenstat	Burleson		
Goodwill	Burleson		
Gus	Burleson		
Harmony	Burleson		
Hix	Burleson		
Hogg	Burleson		
Lyons	Burleson		
Merle	Burleson		
Rita	Burleson		
Scofield	Burleson		
Tunis	Burleson		
Wilcox	Burleson		
Briggs	Burnet		
Lake Victor	Burnet		
Oakalla	Burnet		
Oatmeal	Burnet		
Smithwick	Burnet		
Spicewood	Burnet		
Dale	Caldwell		
Fentress	Caldwell		
Lytton Springs	Caldwell		
Maxwell	Caldwell		
Pettytown	Caldwell		
Prairie Lea	Caldwell		
Saint Johns Colony	Caldwell		
Seawillow	Caldwell		
Stairtown	Caldwell		
Alamo Beach	Calhoun		
Indianola	Calhoun		
Long Mott	Calhoun		
Magnolia Beach	Calhoun		
Port O'Connor	Calhoun		
Belle Plain	Callahan		
Callahan City	Callahan		
Cottonwood	Callahan		
Eula	Callahan		
Arroyo Alto	Cameron		
Arroyo Colorado Estates	Cameron		
Arroyo Gardens	Cameron		
Bixby	Cameron		
Bluetown	Cameron		
Cameron Park	Cameron		
Del Mar Heights	Cameron		
El Camino Angosto	Cameron		
Encantada-Ranchito El Calaboz	Cameron		
Grand Acres	Cameron		
Green Valley Farms	Cameron		
Iglesia Antigua	Cameron		
Juarez	Cameron		
La Feria North	Cameron		
La Paloma	Cameron		
La Tina Ranch	Cameron		
Lago	Cameron		
Laguna Heights	Cameron		
Las Palmas II	Cameron		
Lasana	Cameron		
Laureles	Cameron		
Lozano	Cameron		
Olmito	Cameron		
Orason	Cameron		
Rangerville	Cameron		
Ratamosa	Cameron		
Reid Hope King	Cameron		
San Pedro	Cameron		
Santa Maria	Cameron		
Solis	Cameron		
South Point	Cameron		
Tierra Bonita	Cameron		
Villa del Sol	Cameron		
Villa Pancho	Cameron		
Yznaga	Cameron		
Lantana	Cameron		
Chula Vista	Cameron		
Leesburg	Camp		
Bivins	Cass		
Kildare	Cass		
McLeod	Cass		
Hilburn	Castro		
Summerfield	Castro		
Sunnyside	Castro		
Double Bayou	Chambers		
Hankamer	Chambers		
Monroe City	Chambers		
Oak Island	Chambers		
Seabreeze	Chambers		
Smith Point	Chambers		
Stowell	Chambers		
Turtle Bayou	Chambers		
Wallisville	Chambers		
Winnie	Chambers		
Blackjack	Cherokee		
Dialville	Cherokee		
Etna	Cherokee		
Forest	Cherokee		
Maydelle	Cherokee		
Mount Selman	Cherokee		
Reese	Cherokee		
Shadybrook	Cherokee		
Concord	Cherokee		
Carey	Childress		
Tell	Childress		
Bluegrove	Clay		
Buffalo Springs	Clay		
Charlie	Clay		
Halsell	Clay		
Hurnville	Clay		
Joy	Clay		
Shannon	Clay		
Stanfield	Clay		
Thornberry	Clay		
Vashti	Clay		
Bledsoe	Cochran		
Sanco	Coke		
Silver	Coke		
Tennyson	Coke		
Burkett	Coleman		
Goldsboro	Coleman		
Gouldbusk	Coleman		
Leaday	Coleman		
Rockwood	Coleman		
Talpa	Coleman		
Valera	Coleman		
Voss	Coleman		
Whon	Coleman		
Altoga	Collin		
Branch	Collin		
Copeville	Collin		
Culleoka	Collin		
Desert	Collin		
Frognot	Collin		
Pike	Collin		
Westminster	Collin		
Dozier	Collingsworth		
Quail	Collingsworth		
Samnorwood	Collingsworth		
Alleyton	Colorado		
Altair	Colorado		
Frelsburg	Colorado		
Garwood	Colorado		
Glidden	Colorado		
Nada	Colorado		
Oakland	Colorado		
Rock Island	Colorado		
Sheridan	Colorado		
Bracken	Comal		
Canyon City	Comal		
Canyon Lake	Comal		
Fischer	Comal		
Sattler	Comal		
Startzville	Comal		
Duster	Comanche		
Energy	Comanche		
Hasse	Comanche		
Proctor	Comanche		
Rucker	Comanche		
Sidney	Comanche		
Eola	Concho		
Lowake	Concho		
Millersview	Concho		
Vick	Concho		
Bulcher	Cooke		
Era	Cooke		
Lake Kiowa	Cooke		
Marysville	Cooke		
Myra	Cooke		
Rosston	Cooke		
Sivells Bend	Cooke		
Arnett	Coryell		
Bee House	Coryell		
Flat	Coryell		
Fort Gates	Coryell		
Fort Cavazos	Coryell		Formerly Fort Hood
Jonesboro	Coryell		
King	Coryell		
Leon Junction	Coryell		
Mound	Coryell		
Pancake	Coryell		
Pearl	Coryell		
Purmela	Coryell		
The Grove	Coryell	65 (2000)	Single owner/Primarily tourist location
Topsey	Coryell		
Turnersville	Coryell		
Cee Vee	Cottle		
Narcisso	Cottle		
Tubbs Corner	Crane		
Emerald	Crockett		
Ozona	Crockett	3225 (2010)	County Seat
Cone	Crosby		
Kalgary	Crosby		
Kent	Culberson		
Kerrick	Dallam		
Perico	Dallam		
Sand Branch	Dallas		
Patricia	Dawson		
Welch	Dawson		
Klondike	Dawson		
Friendship	Dawson		
Bootleg	Deaf Smith		
Dawn	Deaf Smith		
Glenrio	Deaf Smith		
New Mexico	Deaf Smith		
Antioch	Delta		
Ben Franklin	Delta		
Charleston	Delta		
Enloe	Delta		
Klondike	Delta		
Lake Creek	Delta		
Bolivar	Denton		
Elizabethtown	Denton		
Lantana	Denton		
Navo	Denton		
Paloma Creek	Denton		
Paloma Creek South	Denton		
Savannah	Denton		
Hochheim	DeWitt		
Meyersville	DeWitt		
Pearl City	DeWitt		
Thomaston	DeWitt		
Westhoff	DeWitt		
Afton	Dickens		
McAdoo	Dickens		
Brundage	Dimmit		
Carrizo Hill	Dimmit		
Catarina	Dimmit		
Lelia Lake	Donley		
Concepcion	Duval		
Ramirez	Duval		
Realitos	Duval		
Rios	Duval		
Sejita	Duval		
Desdemona	Eastland		
Mangum	Eastland		
Morton Valley	Eastland		
Okra	Eastland		
Olden	Eastland		
Romney	Eastland		
Notrees	Ector		
Penwell	Ector		
Pleasant Farms	Ector		
West Odessa	Ector		
Gardendale	Ector		
Barksdale	Edwards		
Carta Valley	Edwards		
Agua Dulce	El Paso		
Butterfield	El Paso		
Canutillo	El Paso		
Fabens	El Paso		
Fort Bliss	El Paso		
Homestead Meadows North	El Paso		
Homestead Meadows South	El Paso		
Montana Vista	El Paso		
Morning Glory	El Paso		
Newman	El Paso		
Prado Verde	El Paso		
San Elizario	El Paso		
Sparks	El Paso		
Tornillo	El Paso		
Westway	El Paso		
Avalon	Ellis		
Bristol	Ellis		
Forreston	Ellis		
Ike	Ellis		
Ozro	Ellis		
Rockett	Ellis		
Telico	Ellis		
Bluff Dale	Erath		
Huckabay	Erath		
Lingleville	Erath		
Morgan Mill	Erath		
Thurber	Erath		
Barclay	Falls		
Cedar Springs	Falls		
Cego	Falls		
Chilton	Falls		
Durango	Falls		
Highbank	Falls		
Otto	Falls		
Perry	Falls		
Reagan	Falls		
Satin	Falls		
Tomlinson Hill	Falls		
Westphalia	Falls		
Wilderville	Falls		
Zipperlandville	Falls		
Gober	Fannin		
Ivanhoe	Fannin		
Lannius	Fannin		
Randolph	Fannin		
Telephone	Fannin		
Warren	Fannin		
Elwood	Fannin		
Ammannsville	Fayette		
Black Jack Springs	Fayette		
Bluff	Fayette		
Cistern	Fayette		
Dubina	Fayette		
Ellinger	Fayette		
Engle	Fayette		
Freyburg	Fayette		
High Hill	Fayette		
Holman	Fayette		
Hostyn	Fayette		
Kirtley	Fayette		
Ledbetter	Fayette		
Muldoon	Fayette		
Mullins Prairie	Fayette		
Nechanitz	Fayette		
Oldenburg	Fayette		
O'Quinn	Fayette		
Park	Fayette		
Plum	Fayette		
Praha	Fayette		
Rabbs Prairie	Fayette		
Rek Hill	Fayette		
Roznov	Fayette		
Rutersville	Fayette		
St. John	Fayette		
Swiss Alp	Fayette		
Waldeck	Fayette		
Walhalla	Fayette		
Warda	Fayette		
Warrenton	Fayette		
West Point	Fayette		
McCaulley	Fisher		
Sylvester	Fisher		
South Plains	Floyd		
Dougherty	Floyd		
McCoy	Floyd		
Aiken	Floyd		
Thalia	Foard		
Booth	Fort Bend		
Cinco Ranch	Fort Bend		
Clodine	Fort Bend		
Cumings	Fort Bend		
DeWalt	Fort Bend		
Fifth Street	Fort Bend		
Foster	Fort Bend		
Four Corners	Fort Bend		
Fresno	Fort Bend		
Greatwood	Fort Bend		
Guy	Fort Bend		
Long Point	Fort Bend		
Mission Bend	Fort Bend		
New Territory	Fort Bend		
Pecan Grove	Fort Bend		
Pittsville	Fort Bend		
Powell Point	Fort Bend		
Sienna Plantation	Fort Bend		
Tavener	Fort Bend		
Scroggins	Franklin		
Butler	Freestone		
Coutchman	Freestone		
Dew	Freestone		
Donie	Freestone		
Bigfoot	Frio		
Frio Town	Frio		
Moore	Frio		
North Pearsall	Frio		
Hilltop	Frio		
Loop	Gaines		
Algoa	Galveston		
Alta Loma	Galveston		
Bacliff	Galveston		
Bayview	Galveston		
Bolivar Peninsula	Galveston		
Caplen	Galveston		
Gilchrist	Galveston		
High Island	Galveston		
San Leon	Galveston		
Arcadia	Galveston		
Close City	Garza		
Justiceburg	Garza		
Southland	Garza		
Doss	Gillespie		
Harper	Gillespie		
Luckenbach	Gillespie	3 (2006)	Single owner/Primarily tourist location
Garden City	Glasscock	334 (2010)	County Seat
Saint Lawrence	Glasscock		
Berclair	Goliad		
Fannin	Goliad		
Weesatche	Goliad		
Bebe	Gonzales		
Belmont	Gonzales		
Cost	Gonzales		
Harwood	Gonzales		
Leesville	Gonzales		
Ottine	Gonzales		
Wrightsboro	Gonzales		
Thompsonville	Gonzales		
Alanreed	Gray		
Back, Texas	Gray		
Ambrose	Grayson		
Bugtussle	Grayson		
Gordonville	Grayson		
Luella	Grayson		
Preston	Grayson		
Sherwood Shores	Grayson		
Elderville	Gregg		
Judson	Gregg		
Lake Cherokee	Gregg		
Liberty City	Gregg		
Shiloh	Gregg		
Spring Hill annexed by Longview	Gregg		
Courtney	Grimes		
Iola	Grimes		
Danville	Gregg		
Pine Tree	Gregg		
Plantersville	Grimes		
Richards	Grimes		
Roans Prairie	Grimes		
Sabine	Gregg		
Shiro	Grimes		
Singleton	Grimes		
Stoneham	Grimes		
Geronimo	Guadalupe		
Lake Dunlap	Guadalupe		
McQueeney	Guadalupe		
Northcliff	Guadalupe		
Redwood	Guadalupe		
Zuehl	Guadalupe		
Sweet Home	Guadalupe		
Cotton Center	Hale		
Seth Ward	Hale		
Carlton	Hamilton		
Fairy	Hamilton		
Jonesboro	Hamilton		
McGirk	Hamilton		
Pottsville	Hamilton		
Morse	Hansford		
Batson	Hardin		
Bragg	Hardin		
Honey Island	Hardin		
Pinewood Estates	Hardin		
Saratoga	Hardin		
Thicket	Hardin		
Village Mills	Hardin		
Votaw	Hardin		
Wildwood	Hardin		
Aldine	Harris		
Atascocita	Harris		
Bammel	Harris		
Barker	Harris		
Barrett	Harris		
Beaumont Place	Harris		
Bridgeland Community	Harris		
Cedar Bayou	Harris		
Champion Forest	Harris		
Channelview	Harris		
Cinco Ranch	Harris		
Cloverleaf	Harris		
Crosby	Harris		
Cypress	Harris	200839 (2020)	
Dyersdale	Harris		
Highlands	Harris		
Hockley	Harris		
Houmont Park	Harris		
Hufsmith	Harris		
Kinwood	Harris		
Klein	Harris		
Kleinbrook	Harris		
Kohrville	Harris		
Louetta	Harris		
Lynchburg	Harris		
McNair	Harris		
Mission Bend	Harris		
North Houston	Harris		
Northcliffe	Harris		
Northcliffe Manor	Harris		
Remington Ranch	Harris		
Satsuma	Harris		
Sheldon	Harris		
Spring	Harris		
The Woodlands	Harris		
Timber Meadows	Harris		
Traces	Harris		
Westfield	Harris		
Rose Hill	Harris		
Elysian Fields	Harrison		
Gill	Harrison		
Harleton	Harrison		
Jonesville	Harrison		
Karnack	Harrison		
Woodlawn	Harrison		
Hartley	Hartley		
Paint Creek	Haskell		
Sagerton	Haskell		
Driftwood	Hays		
Goforth	Hays		
Glazier	Hemphill		
Cross Roads	Henderson		
LaRue	Henderson		
Latex	Henderson		
New York	Henderson		
Tool	Henderson		
Abram	Hidalgo		
Alton North	Hidalgo		
Cesar Chavez	Hidalgo		
Citrus City	Hidalgo		
Cuevitas	Hidalgo		
Doffing	Hidalgo		
Doolittle	Hidalgo		
El Gato	Hidalgo		
Faysville	Hidalgo		
Hargill	Hidalgo		
Havana	Hidalgo		
Heidelberg	Hidalgo		
Indian Hills	Hidalgo		
La Blanca	Hidalgo		
La Homa	Hidalgo		
Laguna Seca	Hidalgo		
Linn	Hidalgo		
Llano Grande	Hidalgo		
Lopezville	Hidalgo		
Midway North	Hidalgo		
Midway South	Hidalgo		
Mila Doce	Hidalgo		
Monte Alto	Hidalgo		
Muniz	Hidalgo		
Murillo	Hidalgo		
North Alamo	Hidalgo		
Olivarez	Hidalgo		
Palmview South	Hidalgo		
Perezville	Hidalgo		
Relampago	Hidalgo		
Runn	Hidalgo		
San Carlos	Hidalgo		
Scissors	Hidalgo		
South Alamo	Hidalgo		
Villa Verde	Hidalgo		
West Sharyland	Hidalgo		
Los Ebanos	Hidalgo		
Birome	Hill		
Brandon	Hill		
Irene	Hill		
Pep	Hockley		
Whitharral	Hockley		
Acton	Hood		
Canyon Creek	Hood		
Oak Trail Shores	Hood		
Paluxy	Hood		
Pecan Plantation	Hood		
Brashear	Hopkins		
Dike	Hopkins		
Gafford	Hopkins		
Pickton	Hopkins		
Pine Forest	Hopkins		
Saltillo	Hopkins		
Sulphur Bluff	Hopkins		
Who'd Thought It	Hopkins		
Austonio	Houston		
Pennington	Houston		
Ratcliff	Houston		
Elbow	Howard		
Knott	Howard		
Sand Springs	Howard		
Vealmoor	Howard		
Allamoore	Hudspeth		
Cornudas	Hudspeth	3 (2020)	Single owner/Primarily tourist location
Fort Hancock	Hudspeth		
Salt Flat	Hudspeth		
Sierra Blanca	Hudspeth	553 (2010)	County Seat
Cash	Hunt		
Clinton	Hunt		
Fairlie	Hunt		
Floyd	Hunt		
Hogeye	Hunt		
Jacobia	Hunt		
Kingston	Hunt		
Merit	Hunt		
Wagner	Hunt		
Wieland	Hunt		
Concord	Hunt		
Lake Meredith Estates	Hutchinson		
Phillips	Hutchinson		
Plemons	Hutchinson		
Pringle	Hutchinson		
Whittenburg	Hutchinson		
Barnhart	Irion		
Sherwood	Irion		
Antelope	Jack		
Jermyn	Jack		
Joplin	Jack		
Perrin	Jack		
Wizard Wells	Jack		
Francitas	Jackson		
La Salle	Jackson		
Lolita	Jackson		
Vanderbilt	Jackson		
Beans	Jasper		
Bessmay	Jasper		
Bon Ami	Jasper		
Brookeland	Jasper		
Buna	Jasper		
Ebenezer	Jasper		
Erin	Jasper		
Evadale	Jasper		
Magnolia Springs	Jasper		
Roganville	Jasper		
Sam Rayburn	Jasper		
Zeirath	Jasper		
Fort Davis	Jeff Davis	1201 (2010)	County Seat
Central Gardens	Jefferson		
Fannett	Jefferson		
Hamshire	Jefferson		
LaBelle	Jefferson		
Sabine Pass	Jefferson		
Agua Nueva	Jim Hogg		
Guerra	Jim Hogg		
Hebbronville	Jim Hogg	4558 (2010)	County Seat
Las Lomitas	Jim Hogg		
Randado	Jim Hogg		
South Fork Estates	Jim Hogg		
Thompsonville	Jim Hogg		
Alfred	Jim Wells		
Alice Acres	Jim Wells		
Amargosa	Jim Wells		
Ben Bolt	Jim Wells		
Bentonville	Jim Wells		
Coyote Acres	Jim Wells		
K-Bar Ranch	Jim Wells		
Owl Ranch	Jim Wells		
Palito Blanco	Jim Wells		
Rancho Alegre	Jim Wells		
Rancho de la Parita	Jim Wells		
Sandia	Jim Wells		
South La Paloma	Jim Wells		
Westdale	Jim Wells		
Casa Blanca	Jim Wells		
La Gloria	Jim Wells		
Loma Linda East	Jim Wells		
Bono	Johnson		
Cuba	Johnson		
Egan	Johnson		
Lillian	Johnson		
Marystown	Johnson		
Parker	Johnson		
Johnson	Johnson		
Stubblefield	Johnson		
Wooded Hills	Johnson		
Avoca	Jones		
Corinth	Jones		
Noodle	Jones		
Nugent	Jones		
Radium	Jones		
Tuxedo	Jones		
Cestohowa	Karnes		
Ecleto	Karnes		
Gillett	Karnes		
Helena	Karnes		
Hobson	Karnes		
Panna Maria	Karnes		
Wintergreen	Karnes		
Ables Springs	Kaufman		
Elmo	Kaufman		
Poetry	Kaufman		
Travis Ranch	Kaufman		
McCoy	Kaufman		
Bergheim	Kendall		
Comfort	Kendall		
Kendalia	Kendall		
Sisterdale	Kendall		
Waring	Kendall		
Armstrong	Kenedy		
Sarita	Kenedy	238 (2010)	County Seat
Clairemont	Kent		
Girard	Kent		
Camp Verde	Kerr		
Center Point	Kerr		
Hunt	Kerr		
Mountain Home	Kerr		
London	Kimble		
Telegraph	Kimble		
Roosevelt	Kimble		
Dumont	King		
Finney	King		
Grow	King		
Guthrie	King	160 (2010)	County Seat
Fort Clark Springs	Kinney		
Loyola Beach	Kleberg		
Ricardo	Kleberg		
Riviera	Kleberg		
Vattman	Kleberg		
Rhineland	Knox		
Truscott	Knox		
Artesia Wells	La Salle		
Fowlerton	La Salle		
Gardendale	La Salle		
Los Angeles	La Salle		
Arthur City	Lamar		
Brookston	Lamar		
Chicota	Lamar		
Cunningham	Lamar		
High	Lamar		
Midcity	Lamar		
Pattonville	Lamar		
Petty	Lamar		
Powderly	Lamar		
Sumner	Lamar		
Earth	Lamb		
Fieldton	Lamb		
Spade	Lamb		
Bend	Lampasas		
Izoro	Lampasas		
Speaks	Lavaca		
Sublime	Lavaca		
Sweet Home	Lavaca		
Blue	Lee		
Dime Box	Lee		
Hills	Lee		
Lincoln	Lee		
Serbin	Lee		
Sweet Home	Lee		
Flynn	Leon		
Hilltop Lakes	Leon		
Keechi	Leon		
Concord	Leon		
Friendship	Leon		
Egypt	Leon		
Big Thicket Lake Estates	Liberty		
Dolen	Liberty		
Hightower	Liberty		
Hoop and Holler	Liberty		
Hull	Liberty		
Moss Bluff	Liberty		
Moss Hill	Liberty		
Rayburn	Liberty		
Raywood	Liberty		
Romayor	Liberty		
Rye	Liberty		
Stilson	Liberty		
Tarkington Prairie	Liberty		
Concord	Liberty		
Ben Hur	Limestone		
Fair Oaks	Limestone		
Forest Glade	Limestone		
Prairie Hill	Limestone		
Lipscomb	Lipscomb	37 (2010)	County Seat
Dinero	Live Oak		
Lebanon	Live Oak		
Oakville	Live Oak		
Pernitas Point	Live Oak and Jim Wells		
Ray Point	Live Oak		
Swinney Switch	Live Oak		
Whitsett	Live Oak		
Bluffton	Llano		
Buchanan Dam	Llano		
Buchanan Lake Village	Llano		
Castell	Llano		
Kingsland	Llano		
Tow	Llano		
Valley Spring	Llano		
Mentone	Loving	19 (2010)	County Seat
Porterville	Loving		
Acuff	Lubbock		
Heckville	Lubbock		
Reese Center	Lubbock		
Roosevelt	Lubbock		
Slide	Lubbock		
Woodrow	Lubbock		
Grassland	Lynn		
Wayside	Lynn		
North Zulch	Madison		
Concord	Madison		
Elwood	Madison		
Lodi	Marion		
Pine Harbor	Marion		
Smithland	Marion		
Lenorah	Martin		
Tarzan	Martin		
Art	Mason		
Fredonia	Mason		
Loyal Valley	Mason		
Katemcy	Mason		
Pontotoc	Mason		
Allenhurst	Matagorda		
Blessing	Matagorda		
Caney	Matagorda		
Cedar Lake	Matagorda		
Cedar Lane	Matagorda		
Clemville	Matagorda		
Collegeport	Matagorda		
Elmaton	Matagorda		
Hawkinsville	Matagorda		
Markham	Matagorda		
Matagorda	Matagorda		
Midfield	Matagorda		
Pledger	Matagorda		
Sargent	Matagorda		
Van Vleck	Matagorda		
Wadsworth	Matagorda		
Eidson Road	Maverick		
El Indio	Maverick		
Elm Creek	Maverick		
Fabrica	Maverick		
Las Quintas Fronterizas	Maverick		
Quemado	Maverick		
Radar Base	Maverick		
Rosita	Maverick		
Seco Mines	Maverick		
Siesta Acres	Maverick		
Chula Vista	Maverick		
Doole	McCulloch		
Fife	McCulloch		
Lohn	McCulloch		
Mercury	McCulloch		
Pear Valley	McCulloch		
Rochelle	McCulloch		
Voca	McCulloch		
Axtell	McLennan		
China Spring	McLennan		
Elm Mott	McLennan		
Ocee	McLennan		
Calliham	McMullen		
Tilden	McMullen	450 (2000)	County Seat
D'Hanis	Medina		
Dunlay	Medina		
Lake Medina Shores	Medina		
Mico	Medina		
Pearson	Medina		
Rio Medina	Medina		
Yancey	Medina		
Beyer Crossing	Menard		
Callan	Menard		
Fort McKavett	Menard		
Hext	Menard		
Saline	Menard		
Sunnyside	Menard		
Greenwood	Midland		
Ben Arnold	Milam		
Burlington	Milam		
Cummins Crossing	Milam		
Davilla	Milam		
Elevation	Milam		
Gause	Milam		
Maysfield	Milam		
Salty	Milam		
San Gabriel	Milam		
Val Verde	Milam		
Priddy	Mills		
Star	Mills		
Lake Colorado City	Mitchell		
Belcherville	Montague		
Bonita	Montague		
Capps Corner	Montague		
Forestburg	Montague		
Illinois Bend	Montague		
Montague	Montague	304 (2010)	County Seat
Nocona Hills	Montague		
Red River Station	Montague		
Ringgold	Montague		
Spanish Fort	Montague		
Stoneburg	Montague		
Sunset	Montague		
Chateau Woods	Montgomery		
Dobbin	Montgomery		
Grangerland	Montgomery		
Imperial Oaks	Montgomery		
Pinehurst	Montgomery		
Porter	Montgomery		
Porter Heights	Montgomery		
Tamina	Montgomery		
The Woodlands	Montgomery		
Egypt	Montgomery		
Masterson	Moore		
Cason	Morris		
Flomot	Motley		
Northfield	Motley		
Tee Pee City	Motley		
Douglass	Nacogdoches		
Etoile	Nacogdoches		
Martinsville	Nacogdoches		
Redfield	Nacogdoches		
Sacul	Nacogdoches		
Woden	Nacogdoches		
Chatfield	Navarro		
Goodnight	Navarro		
Purdon	Navarro		
Biloxi	Newton		
Bon Wier	Newton		
Call	Newton		
Deweyville	Newton		
Mayflower	Newton		
Princeton	Newton		
South Toledo Bend	Newton		
Trotti	Newton		
Wiergate	Newton		
Bitter Creek	Nolan		
Maryneal	Nolan		
Nolan	Nolan		
Banquete	Nueces		
Chapman Ranch	Nueces		
La Paloma-Lost Creek	Nueces		
North San Pedro	Nueces		
Rabb	Nueces		
Rancho Banquete	Nueces		
Sandy Hollow-Escondidas	Nueces		
Spring Gardens	Nueces		
Tierra Grande	Nueces		
Tierra Verde	Nueces		
Violet	Nueces		
Farnsworth	Ochiltree		
Waka	Ochiltree		
Boise	Oldham		
Boys Ranch	Oldham		
Gruhlkey	Oldham		
Herring	Oldham		
Landergin	Oldham		
Magenta	Oldham		
Tascosa	Oldham		
Trujillo	Oldham		
Wildorado	Oldham		
Echo	Orange		
Forest Heights	Orange		
Lakeview	Orange		
Lemonville	Orange		
Little Cypress	Orange		
Mauriceville	Orange		
Orangefield	Orange		
Texla	Orange		
Brazos	Palo Pinto		
Lone Camp	Palo Pinto		
Oran	Palo Pinto		
Palo Pinto	Palo Pinto	333 (2010)	County Seat
Santo	Palo Pinto		
Clayton	Panola		
Deadwood	Panola		
DeBerry	Panola		
Galloway	Panola		
Long Branch	Panola		
Mineral Springs	Panola		
Murvaul	Panola		
Panola	Panola		
McCoy	Panola		
Briar	Parker		
Brock	Parker		
Dennis	Parker		
Garner	Parker		
Horseshoe Bend	Parker		
Peaster	Parker		
Poolville	Parker		
Western Lake	Parker		
Whitt	Parker		
Black	Parmer		
Lazbuddie	Parmer		
Bakersfield	Pecos		
Coyanosa	Pecos	163 (2010)	
Girvin	Pecos		
Imperial	Pecos		
Sheffield	Pecos		
Ace	Polk		
Barnum	Polk		
Big Thicket Lake Estates	Polk		
Blanchard	Polk		
Camden	Polk		
Cedar Point	Polk		
Dallardsville	Polk		
Indian Springs	Polk		
Laurelia	Polk		
Leggett	Polk		
Moscow	Polk		
Pleasant Hill	Polk		
Segno	Polk		
West Livingston	Polk		
Bushland	Potter		
Candelaria	Presidio		
Chinati	Presidio		
Plata	Presidio		
Redford	Presidio		
Ruidosa	Presidio		
Shafter	Presidio		
Dougherty	Rains		
Umbarger	Randall		
Best	Reagan		
Stiles	Reagan		
Texon	Reagan		
Rio Frio	Real		
Bagwell	Red River		
Maple	Red River		
McCoy	Red River		
Lindsay	Reeves		
Saragosa	Reeves		
Toyahvale	Reeves		
Verhalen	Reeves		
Tivoli	Refugio		
Wayside	Roberts		
Black Jack	Robertson		
Easterly	Robertson		
Hammond	Robertson		
Mumford	Robertson		
New Baden	Robertson		
Ridge	Robertson		
Tidwell Prairie	Robertson		
Wheelock	Robertson		
Marie	Runnels		
Maverick	Runnels		
Norton	Runnels		
Rowena	Runnels		
Wingate	Runnels		
Concord	Rusk		
Joinerville	Rusk		
Laird Hill	Rusk		
Lake Cherokee	Rusk		
Laneville	Rusk		
Leverett's Chapel	Rusk		
McKnight	Rusk		
Price	Rusk		
Selman City	Rusk		
Turnertown	Rusk		
Bronson	Sabine		
Brookeland	Sabine		
Fairmount	Sabine		
Geneva	Sabine		
Isla	Sabine		
Milam	Sabine		
Rosevine	Sabine		
Sexton	Sabine		
Yellowpine	Sabine		
Cape Royale	San Jacinto		
Oakhurst	San Jacinto		
Rose Hill	San Jacinto		
Country Acres	San Patricio		
Del Sol	San Patricio		
Doyle	San Patricio		
Edgewater Estates	San Patricio		
Edroy	San Patricio		
Falman	San Patricio		
La Paloma Addition	San Patricio		
Lakeshore Gardens-Hidden Acres	San Patricio		
Loma Linda	San Patricio		
Morgan Farm	San Patricio		
Paisano Park	San Patricio		
Rancho Chico	San Patricio		
St. Paul	San Patricio		
Taft Southwest	San Patricio		
Tradewinds	San Patricio		
Bend	San Saba		
Cherokee	San Saba		
Adams	Schleicher		
Hulldale	Schleicher		
Dermott	Scurry		
Dunn	Scurry		
Fluvanna	Scurry		
Hermleigh	Scurry		
Ira	Scurry		
Aiken	Shelby		
Arcadia	Shelby		
Dreka	Shelby		
Shelbyville	Shelby		
New Harmony	Shelby		
Bascom	Smith		
Dogwood City	Smith		
Emerald Bay	Smith		
Flint	Smith		
Gresham	Smith		
Mount Sylvan	Smith		
New Harmony	Smith		
New Hope	Smith		
Owentown	Smith		
Red Springs	Smith		
Starrville	Smith		
Swan	Smith		
Cottonwood	Somervell		
George's Creek	Somervell		
Glass	Somervell		
Lanham Mill	Somervell		
Nemo	Somervell		
Rainbow	Somervell		
Rock Creek	Somervell		
Wilcox	Somervell		
Airport Heights	Starr		
Alto Bonito Heights	Starr		
Amada Acres	Starr		
Anacua	Starr		
B and E	Starr		
Barrera	Starr		
Benjamin Perez	Starr		
Buena Vista	Starr		
Camargito	Starr		
Campo Verde	Starr		
Casa Blanca	Starr		
Casas	Starr		
Chaparrito	Starr		
Chapeno	Starr		
Delmita	Starr		
East Alto Bonito	Starr		
East Lopez	Starr		
El Brazil	Starr		
El Castillo	Starr		
El Cenizo	Starr		
El Chaparral	Starr		
El Mesquite	Starr		
El Quiote	Starr		
El Rancho Vela	Starr		
El Refugio	Starr		
El Socio	Starr		
Elias-Fela Solis	Starr		
Escobar I	Starr		
Eugenio Saenz	Starr		
Evergreen	Starr		
Falcon Heights	Starr		
Falcon Village	Starr		
Falconaire	Starr		
Fernando Salinas	Starr		
Flor del Rio	Starr		
Fronton	Starr		
Fronton Ranchettes	Starr		
Garceno	Starr		
Garciasville	Starr		
Garza-Salinas II	Starr		
Guadalupe-Guerra	Starr		
Gutierrez	Starr		
H. Cuellar Estates	Starr		
Hilltop	Starr		
Indio	Starr		
Jardin de San Julian	Starr		
JF Villarreal	Starr		
La Carla	Starr		
La Casita	Starr		
La Chuparosa	Starr		
La Escondida	Starr		
La Esperanza	Starr		
La Gloria	Starr		
La Loma de Falcon	Starr		
La Minita	Starr		
La Paloma Ranchettes	Starr		
La Puerta	Starr		
La Reforma	Starr		
La Rosita	Starr		
La Victoria	Starr		
Lago Vista	Starr		
Las Lomas	Starr		
Loma Linda East	Starr		
Loma Linda West	Starr		
Longoria	Starr		
Los Alvarez	Starr		
Los Arrieros	Starr		
Los Barreras	Starr		
Los Ebanos	Starr		
Manuel Garcia	Starr		
Manuel Garcia II	Starr		
Martinez	Starr		
Mesquite	Starr		
Mi Ranchito Estate	Starr		
Miguel Barrera	Starr		
Mikes	Starr		
Moraida	Starr		
Narciso Pena	Starr		
Netos	Starr		
Nina	Starr		
North Escobares	Starr		
Northridge	Starr		
Old Escobares	Starr		
Olivia Lopez de Gutierrez	Starr		
Olmito and Olmito	Starr		
Pablo Pena	Starr		
Palo Blanco	Starr		
Pena	Starr		
Quesada	Starr		
Rafael Pena	Starr		
Ramirez-Perez	Starr		
Ramos	Starr		
Ranchitos del Norte	Starr		
Rancho Viejo	Starr		
Regino Ramirez	Starr		
Rivera	Starr		
Rivereno	Starr		
Roma Creek	Starr		
Salineño	Starr		
Salineño North	Starr		
Sammy Martinez	Starr		
San Fernando	Starr		
San Isidro	Starr		
San Juan	Starr		
Sandoval	Starr		
Santa Anna	Starr		
Santa Catarina	Starr		
Santa Cruz	Starr		
Santa Elena	Starr		
Santa Rosa	Starr		
Santel	Starr		
Sunset	Starr		
Tierra Dorada	Starr		
Valle Hermoso	Starr		
Valle Vista	Starr		
Victoria Vera	Starr		
Villarreal	Starr		
West Alto Bonito	Starr		
Zarate	Starr		
Loma Vista	Starr		
Caddo	Stephens		
La Casa	Stephens		
Broome	Sterling		
Old Glory	Stonewall		
Peacock	Stonewall		
Rath City	Stonewall		
Swenson	Stonewall		
Happy	Swisher		
Vigo Park	Swisher		
Briar	Tarrant		
Eagle Mountain	Tarrant		
Pecan Acres	Tarrant		
Rendon	Tarrant		
Oak Grove	Tarrant		
Caps	Taylor		
Hamby	Taylor		
Ovalo	Taylor		
Potosi	Taylor		
View	Taylor		
Wylie	Taylor		
Dryden	Terrell		
Sanderson	Terrell	837 (2010)	County Seat
Needmore	Terry		
Tokio	Terry		
Elbert	Throckmorton		
Cookville	Titus		
Ben Ficklin	Tom Green		
Carlsbad	Tom Green		
Christoval	Tom Green		
Grape Creek	Tom Green		
Harriett	Tom Green		
Knickerbocker	Tom Green		
Mereta	Tom Green		
Orient	Tom Green		
Tankersley	Tom Green		
Vancourt	Tom Green		
Veribest	Tom Green		
Wall	Tom Green		
Water Valley	Tom Green		
Anderson Mill	Travis		
Barton Creek	Travis		
Del Valle	Travis		
Garfield	Travis		
Hornsby Bend	Travis		
Hudson Bend	Travis		
Jollyville	Travis		
Lost Creek	Travis		
Manchaca	Travis		
Onion Creek	Travis		
Shady Hollow	Travis		
Turnersville	Travis		
Wells Branch	Travis		
Windemere	Travis		
Apple Springs	Trinity		
Centralia	Trinity		
Nogalus Prairie	Trinity		
Pennington	Trinity		
Westwood Shores	Trinity		
Woodlake	Trinity		
Doucette	Tyler		
Fred	Tyler		
Hillister	Tyler		
Rockland	Tyler		
Spurger	Tyler		
Warren	Tyler		
Wildwood	Tyler		
Bettie	Upshur		
Cox	Upshur		
Diana	Upshur		
Enoch	Upshur		
Friendship	Upshur		
Glenwood	Upshur		
Kelsey	Upshur		
Latch	Upshur		
Pritchett	Upshur		
Rhonesboro	Upshur		
Rosewood	Upshur		
Sand Hill	Upshur		
Shady Grove	Upshur		
Simpsonville	Upshur		
Union Hill	Upshur		
Union Ridge	Upshur		
West Mountain	Upshur		
Midkiff	Upton		
Knippa	Uvalde		
Utopia	Uvalde		
Uvalde Estates	Uvalde		
Amistad	Val Verde		
Box Canyon	Val Verde		
Cienegas Terrace	Val Verde		
Comstock	Val Verde		
Juno	Val Verde		
Lake View	Val Verde		
Langtry	Val Verde		
Laughlin Air Force Base	Val Verde		
Pandale	Val Verde		
Val Verde Park	Val Verde		
Ben Wheeler	Van Zandt		
Callender Lake	Van Zandt		
Elwood	Van Zandt		
Martin's Mill	Van Zandt		
Myrtle Springs	Van Zandt		
Whitton	Van Zandt		
Bloomington	Victoria		
Inez	Victoria		
McFaddin	Victoria		
Moursund	Victoria		
Nursery	Victoria		
Placedo	Victoria		
Quail Creek	Victoria		
Raisin	Victoria		
Telferner	Victoria		
Dodge	Walker		
Fields Store	Waller		
Monaville	Waller		
Shiloh	Waller		
Royalty	Ward		
Berlin	Washington		
Chappell Hill	Washington		
Greenvine	Washington		
Independence	Washington		
Latium	Washington		
Phillipsburg	Washington		
Prairie Hill	Washington		
Quarry	Washington		
Rehburg	Washington		
Salem	Washington		
Washington-on-the-Brazos	Washington		
William Penn	Washington		
Aguilares	Webb		
Bonanza Hills	Webb		
Botines	Webb		
Bruni	Webb		
Callaghan	Webb		
Colorado Acres	Webb		
Darwin	Webb		
Four Points	Webb		
Hillside Acres	Webb		
Islitas	Webb		
La Coma	Webb		
La Presa	Webb		
Laredo Ranchettes	Webb		
Laredo Ranchettes West	Webb		
Larga Vista	Webb		
Las Haciendas	Webb		
Las Pilas	Webb		
Las Tiendas	Webb		
Los Altos	Webb		
Los Arcos	Webb		
Los Centenarios	Webb		
Los Corralitos	Webb		
Los Fresnos	Webb		
Los Huisaches	Webb		
Los Minerales	Webb		
Los Nopalitos	Webb		
Los Ojuelos	Webb		
Los Veteranos I	Webb		
Los Veteranos II	Webb		
Mirando City	Webb		
Oilton	Webb		
Pescadito	Webb		
Pueblo East	Webb		
Pueblo Nuevo	Webb		
Ranchitos East	Webb		
Ranchitos Las Lomas	Webb		
Ranchos Penitas West	Webb		
San Carlos I	Webb		
San Carlos II	Webb		
Santo Tomás	Webb		
Sunset Acres	Webb		
Tanquecitos South Acres	Webb		
Tanquecitos South Acres II	Webb		
Valle Verde	Webb		
Webb	Webb		
Boling	Wharton		
Bonus	Wharton		
Danevang	Wharton		
Egypt	Wharton		
Glen Flora	Wharton		
Hillje	Wharton		
Hungerford	Wharton		
Iago	Wharton		
Lane City	Wharton		
Lissie	Wharton		
Louise	Wharton		
Newgulf	Wharton		
Pierce	Wharton		
Allison	Wheeler		
Briscoe	Wheeler		
Kelton	Wheeler		
Lela	Wheeler		
Twitty	Wheeler		
Bacon	Wichita		
Haynesville	Wichita		
Kamay	Wichita		
Valley View	Wichita		
Harrold	Wilbarger		
Odell	Wilbarger		
Oklaunion	Wilbarger		
Lasara	Willacy		
Los Angeles	Willacy		
Lyford South	Willacy		
Port Mansfield	Willacy		
Ranchette Estates	Willacy		
Santa Monica	Willacy		
Sebastian	Willacy		
Willamar	Willacy		
Zapata Ranch	Willacy		
Anderson Mill	Williamson		
Brushy Creek	Williamson		
Hare	Williamson		
Jollyville	Williamson		
Jonah	Williamson		
Norman's Crossing	Williamson		
Schwertner	Williamson		
Serenada	Williamson		
Walburg	Williamson		
Waterloo	Williamson		
Alum	Wilson		
Carpenter	Wilson		
Doseido Colony	Wilson		
Grass Pond Colony	Wilson		
Kicaster	Wilson		
Pandora	Wilson		
Sandy Hills	Wilson		
Saspamco	Wilson		
Sutherland Springs	Wilson		
Allison	Wise		
Briar	Wise		
Cottondale	Wise		
Greenwood	Wise		
Paradise	Wise		
Pecan Acres	Wise		
Slidell	Wise		
Crow	Wood		
Golden	Wood		
Hainesville	Wood		
Holly Lake Ranch	Wood		
Eliasville	Young		
Loving	Young		
South Bend	Young		
Falcon	Zapata		
Falcon Lake Estates	Zapata		
Falcon Mesa	Zapata		
Las Palmas	Zapata		
Lopeno	Zapata		
Los Lobos	Zapata		
Medina	Zapata		
Morales-Sanchez	Zapata		
New Falcon	Zapata		
Ramireno	Zapata		
San Ygnacio	Zapata		
Siesta Shores	Zapata		
Zapata	Zapata	14390 (2013)	County Seat
Amaya	Zavala		
Batesville	Zavala		
Chula Vista	Zavala		
Cometa	Zavala		
La Pryor	Zavala		
Loma Grande	Zavala		
Loma Vista	Zavala		
Shady Grove	Angelina		
Shady Grove	Burnet		
Shady Grove	Cherokee		
Shady Grove	Cooke		
Shady Grove	Dallas		
Shady Grove	Fannin		
Shady Grove	Houston		
Shady Grove	Kerr		
Shady Grove	Nacogdoches		
Shady Grove	Panola		
Shady Grove	Rains		
Shady Grove	Smith		

== See also ==
- List of cities in Texas
- List of cities in Texas by population
