= Thompsonville =

Thompsonville may refer to a place in the United States:

- Thompsonville, Connecticut
- Thompsonville, Delaware
- Thompsonville, Illinois
- Thompsonville, Kansas
- Thompsonville, Massachusetts
- Thompsonville, Michigan
- Thompsonville, Pennsylvania
- Thompsonville, Texas (disambiguation) (2 places)
  - Thompsonville, Gonzales County, Texas
  - Thompsonville, Jim Hogg County, Texas
