= Blue Texas =

Blue Texas may refer to:

- 2026 Texas elections, in which Democrats won every statewide race, the first statewide victory for the party since 1994; also referred to as Blexas
- Blue Texas: The Making of a Multiracial Democratic Coalition in the Civil Rights Era, 2017 book by Max Krochmal
- Blue Texas, PAC founded by Alexa L. Wesner
- Blue Texas, PAC which supported Democrats in the 2020 United States presidential election in Texas

== See also ==
- Blue, Texas, an unincorporated area located in Lee County, Texas.
- "Blue Texas Moonlight", 1946 single by Elton Britt with The Showstoppers
- "Blue Texas Waltz", 1981 single by Billy Joe Shavers
