= Myrtle Springs =

Myrtle Springs may refer to:

- Myrtle Springs, Texas, a census-designated place (CDP) in Van Zandt County, Texas
- Myrtle Springs Station, a sheep ranch in South Australia
