= Thompsonville, Texas =

Thompsonville, Texas may refer to the following places:

- Thompsonville, Gonzales County, Texas
- Thompsonville, Jim Hogg County, Texas
