= Hog-Eye =

In Missouri, Hog-Eye historically described a "small compact place sunk in a hollow" and was used to refer to several early settlements before they were officially renamed.

- Hog-Eye in Vernon County, Missouri, renamed Nevada, Missouri in 1855
- Hog-Eye in Saint Francois County, Missouri, renamed Haggai in 1890, although it still retained its old pronunciation
- Hog-Eye in Wayne County, Missouri, renamed Lowndes, Missouri
- Hog-Eye in Dallas County, Missouri, renamed Charity, Missouri
- Hogeye, Texas in Hunt County, Texas
- Hogeye, Arkansas, near Fayetteville, Arkansas
- Hogeye, California, former name of Keyesville, California
- Hog Eye, West Virginia

Other uses for Hog-Eye or Hogeye include:

- The Hogeye Marathon and Relays, held in Fayetteville, Arkansas
- The Hogeye Festival, held in Elgin, Texas
- Hogeye (ISBN 0-395-74276-5), a children's novel by Susan Meddaugh
- A Hog-Eye was distinctive flat-bottom boat or barge used in the shallow waters surrounding San Francisco Bay during the California Gold Rush, named from the dismissive name 'ditch-hog' applied to rivermen by deep-water sailors
- The term "hog-eye" was used in early blues songs as a euphemism for the female genitalia

== See also ==
- Pig's Eye (disambiguation)
