= Los Villareales, Texas =

Los Villarreales, Texas
- former CDP
- Coordinates: 26°24′6″N 98°52′41″W
- Country: United States
- State: Texas
- County: Starr

Area
  - Total: 20.5 sq mi (53.1 km^{2})
  - Land: 20.5 sq mi (53.0 km^{2})
  - Water: 0.039 sq mi (0.1 km^{2})
- Elevation: 217 ft (66 m)

Population (2000)
  - Total: 930
  - Density: 45/sq mi (17.5/km^{2})
- Time zone: UTC-6 (Central (CST))
  - Summer (DST): UTC-5 (CDT)
- FIPS code: 48-44168
- GNIS feature ID: 1852734

Los Villareales is a former census-designated place (CDP) in Starr County, Texas, United States. The population was 930 at the 2000 census. The CDP was deleted prior to the 2010 census.

== Geography ==
Los Villareales is located at 26°24′6″N 98°52′41″W (26.401720, -98.878187).

According to the United States Census Bureau, the CDP has a total area of 20.5 square miles (53.1 km^{2}), of which 20.5 square miles (53.0 km^{2}) is land and 0.04 square mile (0.1 km^{2}) (0.19%) is water.

== Demographics ==
Historical population
Census	Pop.	Note	%±
2000	930		—
U.S. Decennial Census; 1850–1900 1910; 1920 1930 1940; 1950 1960 1970; 1980 1990 2000; 2010

Los Villareales was first listed as a census designated place in the 2000 U.S. census. The CDP was deleted prior to the 2010 census. Part was annexed to Rio Grande City and parts were taken to form all of La Escondida, La Esperanza, and Santel CDPs and parts of Mi Ranchito Estate and Ranchitos del Norte CDPs.

Los Villareales CDP, Texas – Racial and ethnic composition Note: the US Census treats Hispanic/Latino as an ethnic category. This table excludes Latinos from the racial categories and assigns them to a separate category. Hispanics/Latinos may be of any race.
Race / Ethnicity (NH = Non-Hispanic)	Pop 2000	% 2000
White alone (NH)	30	3.23%
Black or African American alone (NH)	0	0.00%
Native American or Alaska Native alone (NH)	0	0.00%
Asian alone (NH)	0	0.00%
Pacific Islander alone (NH)	0	0.00%
Other race alone (NH)	0	0.00%
Mixed race or Multiracial (NH)	3	0.32%
Hispanic or Latino (any race)	897	96.45%
Total	930	100.00%

According to the census of 2000, there were 930 people, 238 households, and 211 families were residing in the CDP. The population density was 45.4 inhabitants per square mile (17.5/km^{2}). There were 286 housing units at an average density of 14.0/sq mi (5.4/km^{2}). The racial makeup of the CDP was 75.59% White, 23.23% from other races, and 1.18% from two or more races. Hispanic or Latino of any race were 96.45% of the population.

There were 238 households, out of which 58.4% had children under the age of 18 living with them, 70.6% were married couples living together, 14.7% had a female householder with no husband present, and 11.3% were non-families. 10.9% of all households were made up of individuals, and 5.5% had someone living alone who was 65 years of age or older. The average household size was 3.91 and the average family size was 4.23.

In the CDP, the population was spread out, with 40.3% under the age of 18, 11.3% from 18 to 24, 26.5% from 25 to 44, 15.6% from 45 to 64, and 6.3% who were 65 years of age or older. The median age was 24 years. For every 100 females, there were 93.3 males. For every 100 females age 18 and over, there were 85.0 males.

The median income for a household in the CDP was $18,352, and the median income for a family was $20,063. Males had a median income of $16,250 versus $33,594 for females. The per capita income for the CDP was $5,763. About 39.5% of families and 45.6% of the population were below the poverty line, including 49.3% of those under age 18 and 31.6% of those age 65 or over.

== Education ==
Most of Los Villareales is part of the Rio Grande City Consolidated Independent School District.

A small portion of the community is served by the Roma Independent School District. Zoned campuses in the Roma ISD portion include Anna S. Canavan Elementary School (pre-kindergarten), R.T. Barrera Elementary School (grades K-5), Ramiro Barrera Middle School (grades 6–8), and Roma High School (grades 9–12).
