= Cottonwood, Texas =

Cottonwood could refer to these places in the United States state of Texas:

- Cottonwood, Callahan County, Texas
- Cottonwood, Kaufman County, Texas
- Cottonwood, Somervell County, Texas
- Cottonwood, Madison County, Texas
