= Sam Rayburn Independent School District =

School district in Texas, United States

Coordinates: 33.7594°N 96.0927°W

Location
- Ivanhoe, TX ESC Region 10 USA

District information
- Type: Public
- Grades: Pre-K through 12
- Superintendent: Lance Campbell

Students and staff
- Athletic conference: UIL Class AA (non-football member)
- District mascot: Rebels
- Colors: Red, Grey, and White

Other information
- Website: www.srisd.org

Sam Rayburn Independent School District is a public school district based in the community of Ivanhoe, Texas (USA).

In addition to Ivanhoe, the district also serves the communities of Telephone and Elwood in north central Fannin County.

The district was formed in 1964 by the consolidation of the North Fannin and Telephone districts, and was named after Sam Rayburn (the long-time Speaker of the United States House of Representatives who was from Fannin County). Mr. and Mrs. Sydney Steele donated the land on which the school sits. The bell from the original North Fannin school was preserved and sits on the school campus.

In 2009, the school district was rated "exemplary" by the Texas Education Agency.

== Schools ==
- Sam Rayburn High/Junior High (Grades 7–12)
- Sam Rayburn Elementary (Grades PK-6)
