= Kovar, Texas =

Unincorporated community in Bastrop County, Texas, United States

- Unincorporated community
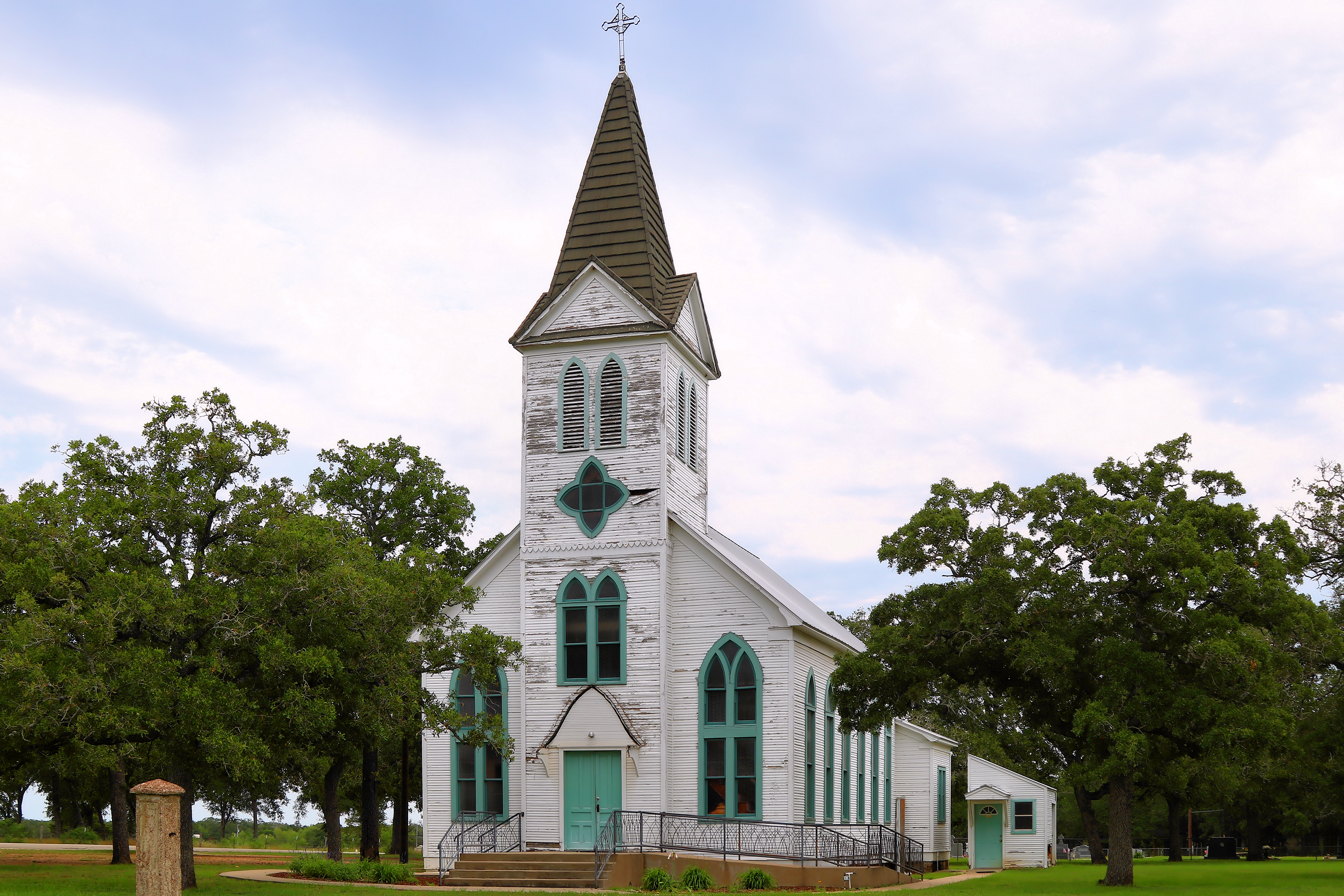
- Saints Peter and Paul Catholic Church, May 2024

- Location within Texas Location within the United States
- Coordinates: 29°54′07″N 97°12′50″W
- Country: United States
- State: Texas
- County: Bastrop
- Elevation: 449 ft (137 m)
- Time zone: UTC-6 (Central (CST))
  - Summer (DST): UTC-5 (CDT)
- Area codes: 512 & 737
- GNIS feature ID: 1380040

Kovar is an unincorporated community in Bastrop County, Texas, United States. It is located within the Greater Austin metropolitan area.

== History ==
Kovar was named for early settler Martin Kovar, who came to the area around 1870. A church was organized by Reverend Jindrich Juren in 1894 and had 30 members in attendance, who had Czech and Moravian heritage. Agriculture and a cotton gin made up the community's economy. A post office was established at Kovar in 1903 and remained in operation until 1914, with Frank Rundus as postmaster. The community never developed fully and never recorded a population, but the community's economy eventually centered on ranching.

Scenes from the movie Hope Floats were filmed at Saints Peter & Paul Catholic Church in Kovar. It is located at the southeastern corner of Zimmerhanzel and Stolle Roads and a large SPJST hall is a short distance to the north. There are two cemeteries a quarter-mile west of the building.

== Geography ==
Kovar is located 8 mi (13 km) south of Smithville in southeastern Bastrop County, and is also 2 mi (3.2 km) west of Texas State Highway 95.

== Education ==
Kovar is served by the Smithville Independent School District.

== See also ==
- List of unincorporated communities in Texas
