= Pig's Eye =

Pig's Eye or Pigs Eye may refer to:

- Pig's Eye (French: L'Oeil du Cochon) was the nickname given to Pierre Parrant because he was blind in one eye.
- Pierre Parrant operated a tavern in what became known as Saint Paul, Minnesota. Before its current name was established, the city of Saint Paul was named "Pig's Eye" after his nickname.
- Pigs Eye Lake, a lake in Minnesota
- The Pig's Eye Brewing Company is located in Saint Paul and named after Pierre Parrant's nickname.

== See also ==
- Hog-Eye (disambiguation)
