= Hope Floats =

1998 film by Forest Whitaker

- Theatrical release poster
- Directed by: Forest Whitaker
- Written by: Steven Rogers
- Produced by: Lynda Obst
- Starring: Sandra Bullock; Harry Connick Jr.; Gena Rowlands; Mae Whitman
- Cinematography: Caleb Deschanel
- Edited by: Richard Chew
- Music by: Dave Grusin
- Production company: Fortis Films
- Distributed by: 20th Century Fox
- Release date: May 29, 1998
- Running time: 114 minutes
- Country: United States
- Language: English
- Budget: $30 million
- Box office: $81.5 million

Hope Floats is a 1998 American romantic drama film directed by Forest Whitaker and starring Sandra Bullock, Harry Connick Jr., Mae Whitman, and Gena Rowlands.

Written by Steven Rogers, the story follows Birdee (Bullock), a sheltered housewife whose life is disrupted when her husband (Michael Paré) reveals his infidelity to her on a Ricki Lake-style talk show. Birdee and her daughter Bernice (Whitman) go to live with her mother (Rowlands) in the small Texas town where Birdee grew up, where everyone knows of her televised marital collapse. She reunites with an old friend named Justin (Connick), who immediately shows romantic interest. While Justin's intentions are clear and good, Birdee struggles with the decision to continue the relationship and unequivocally accept him in her life.

The film made its release on May 29, 1998, and was distributed by 20th Century Fox.

== Plot ==
Chicago housewife Birdee Pruitt is invited on the national Toni Post talk show under the pretense of getting a free makeover. Instead, she is ambushed with the revelation that her husband, Bill, has been having an affair with her best friend, Connie. Humiliated, Birdee and her precocious daughter Bernice move back to Birdee's hometown of Smithville, Texas, with her estranged parents Ramona and Harry and her young, imaginative nephew Travis. As Birdee and Bernice leave Chicago, Birdee gives Bernice a letter from Bill, telling her how much he misses her.

Birdee struggles to make a new life as a working adult and mother and deals with the growing attraction between herself and a former high school classmate, Justin Matisse, who her eccentric mother Ramona hopes that Birdee will get together with. Birdie also tries to rebuild her relationship with her mother, her father (who has Alzheimer's disease), and Bernice. Adding to Birdee's heartache is her former status as the school queen bee and beauty pageant winner who dismissively alienated many of her classmates, who now rub her nose in her televised embarrassment.

Bernice desperately wants to be with her father and attempts to sabotage the romantic overtures Justin makes towards Birdee. Meanwhile, she is also struggling to adjust to her new life and school in Smithville. Ramona tries to mend the gap between her daughter and granddaughter by telling a story about her childhood. She then asks Bernice what she wants for her upcoming birthday. Even though Bernice says she does not have a birthday wish, she secretly wishes for her father to return.

After Ramona dies from a massive heart attack, Birdee's sister and Travis's mother, Desiree, sends a telegram that she cannot make it to the funeral, leaving Travis wondering if his aunt Birdee will raise him now. When Bill arrives at the funeral, Bernice believes that her wish has come true and that her father wants them both to come home. However, it soon becomes clear to Bernice that her parents' split is permanent when Bill asks Birdee for a divorce. Wanting to be with her father, she runs to her room, packs a suitcase, and follows Bill to his car. Bernice is heartbroken and devastated when her father tells her that even though he loves her and he knows that she wants him to take her with him, he has no room for her in his new life with Connie right now but promises to come back for her in the future. As Bill drives off, Birdee picks a sobbing Bernice up, carrying her back into the house. As Birdee comforts her, Bernice says she knows the letter was actually written by her mother, and not really by him.

One day at work, Birdee finds Justin outside waiting for her with flowers. As she walks to him, they embrace.

Birdee takes full custody of Travis and begins dating Justin, but does not plan to marry again for a really long time. Bernice embraces Smithville as her new hometown, ultimately accepts Bill's departure from her life, and has warmed up to Justin as her mother's new love interest and a father figure. Mother and daughter share a humorous moment when Bernice asks if Birdee plans to marry Justin. When Birdee asks her if she does not like him, Bernice says her only real concern is being known as "Bernice Matisse". In voiceover, Birdee concludes "when you find yourself at a new beginning, just give hope a chance to float up".

== Cast ==
- Sandra Bullock as Birdee Pruitt
- Harry Connick Jr. as Justin Matisse, Birdee's love interest
- Gena Rowlands as Ramona Calvert, Birdee's mother
- James N. Harrell as Harry Calvert, Birdee's father
- Mae Whitman as Bernice Pruitt, Birdee's daughter
- Michael Paré as Bill Pruitt, Birdee's former husband
- Cameron Finley as Travis, Birdee's nephew
- Kathy Najimy as Toni Post
- Bill Cobbs as Male Nurse
- Connie Ray as Bobbi-Claire Patterson
- Rosanna Arquette as Connie Phillips (uncredited)

== Production ==
=== Development ===
Sandra Bullock's starring in Speed 2: Cruise Control led to the greenlighting and financial backing of Hope Floats. In March 1997, Harry Connick Jr. was added to the cast. Around that time, Mae Whitman, who had starred in Independence Day and One Fine Day the previous year, was confirmed to have a role in the film.

=== Filming ===
The home in the movie is the McCollum-Chapman-Trousdale House, built in the Neoclassical style in 1908. The elementary school in the movie is a 1924 high school building. The church used was Saints Peter and Paul Church in Kovar, Texas, about 6 miles from Smithville. The church was built in 1921. Many buildings on downtown Smithville's 2nd Street and Main Street stood in for businesses in the film including Snappy Snaps and Honey's Diner.

The film was choreographed by Patsy Swayze, who was the mother of Patrick Swayze.

== Soundtrack ==
Hope Floats: Original Score Soundtrack

Soundtrack album by Various
- Released: 1998
- Genre: Score
- Label: RCA Victor
- Producer: Don Was

The film's soundtrack, released in 1998 and produced by Don Was, featured well-known artists such as Garth Brooks, the Rolling Stones, Bryan Adams, Bob Seger, and Sheryl Crow. Brooks' "To Make You Feel My Love", was a number one single on the Billboard country singles charts for the week of August 1, 1998 and also a Grammy Award nominee for Male Country Vocal performance.

Hope Floats: Original Score Soundtrack

1. "To Make You Feel My Love" (written by Bob Dylan) – Garth Brooks (3:53)
2. "In Need" – Sheryl Crow (5:29)
3. "Honest I Do" (written by Jimmy Reed) – The Rolling Stones (3:55)
4. "Chances Are" – Bob Seger and Martina McBride (4:17)
5. "All I Get" – The Mavericks (4:08)
6. "Paper Wings" – Gillian Welch (3:57)
7. "Stop! In the Name of Love" – Jonell Mosser with David Campbell (4:31)
8. "Wither, I'm a Flower" – Whiskeytown (4:53)
9. "What Makes You Stay" – Deana Carter (4:35)
10. "To Get Me to You" – Lila McCann (3:50)
11. "Smile" – Lyle Lovett with David Campbell (3:38)
12. "When You Love Someone" – Bryan Adams (3:39)
13. "To Make You Feel My Love" (written by Bob Dylan) – Trisha Yearwood (2:57)

== Release ==
=== Theatrical ===
Hope Floats opened in theaters in North America on May 29, 1998, the same day as I Got the Hook-Up and Almost Heroes. The film debuted six months later in the United Kingdom on November 13, 1998, along with Blade.

=== Home media ===
Hope Floats was released on VHS on October 20, 1998. During its first week of release, it beat The X-Files to reach number one on both the sales chart and the rentals chart respectively. The film remained at the top of the rentals chart ahead of Deep Impact in its second week. On that week's sales chart, it fell into fourth place behind The Lion King II: Simba's Pride, Gone with the Wind and Cats.

== Reception ==
=== Box office ===
Hope Floats opened in second place at the box office behind Godzilla, collecting a total of $14.2 million in its first weekend. For its next weekend, it made $8.5 million and dropped into fourth place below the latter film, The Truman Show and A Perfect Murder. The film grossed $60 million domestically and $21.4 million internationally for a worldwide total of $81.5 million.

=== Critical response ===
On review aggregator Rotten Tomatoes, the film holds an approval rating of 27%, based on 33 reviews, with an average rating of 4.9/10. The site's consensus states: "Hope Floats sinks under a deluge of melodramatic turns and syrupy sentimentality, although Sandra Bullock remains a winning star." Metacritic, which uses a weighted average, assigned the film a score of 43 out of 100, based on 19 critics, indicating "mixed or average" reviews. Audiences surveyed by CinemaScore gave the film a grade B+ on scale of A to F.

Mick LaSalle of the San Francisco Chronicle called it "corny and false, with a script by Steven Rogers that's almost 100 percent artificial sweetener." He praised the performances of Sandra Bullock and Dee Hennigan, especially in the scene at the employment agency, and said Harry Connick Jr. was "likable as usual", but found the character Bernice's surliness to be abnormal and painful to watch. Roger Ebert deemed it "a turgid melodrama with the emotional range of a sympathy card", citing the formulaic plot and numerous holes in the characterizations. He gave it two stars. James Berardinelli also gave it two stars, commenting that the film relies too much on stock situations and blatantly calculated attempts to stir emotion while neglecting character-building. He also criticized the acting, saying that Bullock is better suited to more lighthearted fare, and Connick's performance is wooden. The Republican's John R. McEwen had a more mixed reaction, assessing the film as "a run-of-the-mill romance, but fair work by all involved." He particularly praised the chemistry between Connick and Bullock and the country-flavored soundtrack. However, he criticized that the townspeople's callousness towards Birdie strains credulity, since Bullock's performance makes it hard to imagine people disliking her so much, and that even if they did it would be normal for them to have some sympathy after her public humiliation and the breakup of her marriage.

=== Awards and nominations ===
- 1999 ALMA Awards
  - Nomination: Outstanding Performance of a Song for a Feature Film - The Mavericks for the song "All I Get".
- 1999 Acapulco Black Film Festival
  - Nomination: Best Director - Forest Whitaker
- 1999 Blockbuster Entertainment Awards
  - Nomination: Favorite Actor - Drama/Romance - Harry Connick Jr.
  - Nomination: Favorite Supporting Actress - Drama/Romance - Gena Rowlands
- 1999 Lone Star Film & Television Awards
  - Winner: Best Actress - Sandra Bullock
  - Winner: Best Supporting Actress - Gena Rowlands
- 1999 Young Artist Awards
  - Winner: Best Performance in a Feature Film - Young Actress Age Ten or Under - Mae Whitman
  - Nomination: Performance in a Feature Film - Young Actor Age Ten or Under - Cameron Finley
- 1998 YoungStar Awards
  - Nomination: Best Performance by a Young Actor in a Drama Film - Cameron Finley
  - Nomination: Best Performance by a Young Actress in a Drama Film - Mae Whitman
- 1998 Stinkers Bad Movie Awards
  - Nomination: Most Annoying Fake Accent - Sandra Bullock
