= Santa Rosa, Starr County, Texas =

Santa Rosa, Texas
- CDP
- Interactive map of Santa Rosa, Texas
- Coordinates: 26°20′55″N 98°46′12″W
- Country: United States
- State: Texas
- County: Starr

Area
  - Total: 0.1 sq mi (0.26 km^{2})
  - Land: 0.1 sq mi (0.26 km^{2})
  - Water: 0.0 sq mi (0 km^{2})

Population (2020)
  - Total: 265
  - Density: 2,700/sq mi (1,000/km^{2})
- Time zone: UTC-6 (Central (CST))
  - Summer (DST): UTC-5 (CDT)
- Zip Code: 78582

Santa Rosa is a census-designated place (CDP) in Starr County, Texas, United States. It was a new CDP for the 2010 census, with a population of 241. It was formed, along with El Chaparral CDP, from the old Santa Cruz CDP. (Not to be confused with the new Santa Cruz CDP.)

== Geography ==
Santa Rosa is located at 26°20′55″N 98°46′12″W (26.348732, -98.769912).

== Demographics ==
Historical population
| Census | Pop. | Note | %± |
|---|---|---|---|
| 2010 | 241 | | — |
| 2020 | 265 | | 10.0% |
U.S. Decennial Census; 1850–1900 1910; 1920 1930 1940; 1950 1960 1970; 1980 1990 2000; 2010 2020

Santa Rosa was one of two CDPs (along with the El Chaparral CDP) formed out of the deleted Santa Cruz CDP prior to the 2010 U.S. census.

=== 2020 census ===
Santa Rosa CDP, Texas – Racial and ethnic composition Note: the US Census treats Hispanic/Latino as an ethnic category. This table excludes Latinos from the racial categories and assigns them to a separate category. Hispanics/Latinos may be of any race.
| Race / Ethnicity (NH = Non-Hispanic) | Pop 2010 | Pop 2020 | % 2010 | % 2020 |
|---|---|---|---|---|
| White alone (NH) | 0 | 2 | 0.00% | 0.75% |
| Black or African American alone (NH) | 0 | 0 | 0.00% | 0.00% |
| Native American or Alaska Native alone (NH) | 0 | 0 | 0.00% | 0.00% |
| Asian alone (NH) | 0 | 0 | 0.00% | 0.00% |
| Pacific Islander alone (NH) | 0 | 0 | 0.00% | 0.00% |
| Some Other Race alone (NH) | 0 | 0 | 0.00% | 0.00% |
| Mixed Race or Multi-Racial (NH) | 0 | 0 | 0.00% | 0.00% |
| Hispanic or Latino (any race) | 241 | 263 | 100.00% | 99.25% |
| Total | 241 | 265 | 100.00% | 100.00% |

== Education ==
The CDP is within the Rio Grande City Grulla Independent School District (formerly Rio Grande City Consolidated Independent School District)
