= Santa Cruz (former CDP), Texas =

Former US census-designated place

Santa Cruz, Texas
- former Census-designated place
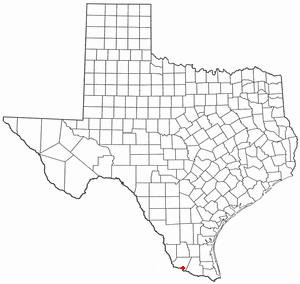
- Location of Santa Cruz, Texas

- Coordinates: 26°20′56″N 98°46′4″W
- Country: United States
- State: Texas
- County: Starr

Area
  - Total: 0.42 sq mi (1.1 km^{2})
  - Land: 0.42 sq mi (1.1 km^{2})
  - Water: 0 sq mi (0.0 km^{2})
- Elevation: 161 ft (49 m)

Population (2000)
  - Total: 630
  - Density: 1,548/sq mi (597.6/km^{2})
- Time zone: UTC-6 (Central (CST))
  - Summer (DST): UTC-5 (CDT)
- ZIP code: 78582
- Area code: 956
- FIPS code: 48-65708
- GNIS feature ID: 1346628

Santa Cruz is a former census-designated place (CDP) in Starr County, Texas, United States. The population was 630 at the 2000 census. Prior to the 2010 census, this CDP was deleted and parts were taken to form El Chaparral and Santa Rosa CDPs. A new CDP of the same name (Santa Cruz) was created that does not contain any part of the old CDP.

== Geography ==
Santa Cruz is located at 26°20′56″N 98°46′4″W (26.348871, -98.767815).

According to the United States Census Bureau, the CDP has a total area of 0.4 square mile (1.1 km^{2}), all land.

== Demographics ==
Historical population
Census	Pop.	Note	%±
2000	630		—
U.S. Decennial Census; 1850–1900 1910; 1920 1930 1940; 1950 1960 1970; 1980 1990 2000; 2010

Santa Cruz first appeared as a census designated place in the 2000 U.S. census. The CDP was split for the 2010 U.S. census into two separate CDPs: El Chaparral and Santa Rosa. A new CDP of the same name (Santa Cruz CDP) was created that does not contain any part of the old CDP.

Santa Cruz CDP, Texas – Racial and ethnic composition Note: the US Census treats Hispanic/Latino as an ethnic category. This table excludes Latinos from the racial categories and assigns them to a separate category. Hispanics/Latinos may be of any race.
Race / Ethnicity (NH = Non-Hispanic)	Pop 2000	% 2000
White alone (NH)	2	0.32%
Black or African American alone (NH)	0	0.00%
Native American or Alaska Native alone (NH)	0	0.00%
Asian alone (NH)	0	0.00%
Pacific Islander alone (NH)	0	0.00%
Other race alone (NH)	0	0.00%
Mixed race or Multiracial (NH)	0	0.00%
Hispanic or Latino (any race)	629	99.68%
Total	630	100.00%

As of the census of 2000, there were 630 people, 158 households, and 148 families residing in the CDP. The population density was 1,547.7 inhabitants per square mile (597.6/km^{2}). There were 179 housing units at an average density of 439.7 per square mile (169.8/km^{2}). The racial makeup of the CDP was 80.63% White, 0.63% African American, 17.46% from other races, and 1.27% from two or more races. Hispanic or Latino of any race were 99.68% of the population.

There were 158 households, out of which 60.8% had children under the age of 18 living with them, 81.0% were married couples living together, 12.7% had a female householder with no husband present, and 5.7% were non-families. 5.1% of all households were made up of individuals, and 3.2% had someone living alone who was 65 years of age or older. The average household size was 3.99 and the average family size was 4.13.

In the CDP, the population was spread out, with 37.8% under the age of 18, 11.9% from 18 to 24, 27.6% from 25 to 44, 17.1% from 45 to 64, and 5.6% who were 65 years of age or older. The median age was 25 years. For every 100 females, there were 81.6 males. For every 100 females age 18 and over, there were 80.6 males.

The median income for a household in the CDP was $16,563, and the median income for a family was $22,581. Males had a median income of $11,771 versus $12,625 for females. The per capita income for the CDP was $4,493. About 59.7% of families and 65.5% of the population were below the poverty line, including 73.0% of those under age 18 and 56.3% of those age 65 or over.

== Education ==
Santa Cruz is served by the Rio Grande City Grulla Independent School District (formerly Rio Grande City Consolidated Independent School District).
