= Ben Hur, Texas =

- Location within Texas Location within the United States
- Coordinates: 31°30′37″N 96°43′40″W
- Country: United States
- State: Texas
- County: Limestone
- Elevation: 469 ft (143 m)

Population (2000)
  - Total: 100
- Time zone: UTC-6 (Central (CST))
  - Summer (DST): UTC-5 (CDT)
- ZIP code: 76642
- GNIS feature ID: 1372493

Ben Hur or Benhur is an unincorporated community in Limestone County, Texas, United States, located about 25 miles east of Waco. Named "Cottonwood" when it was founded in the late 19th century, it changed its name to "Ben Hur" (possibly in honor of Lew Wallace, author of the book Ben Hur) in 1895, because several other communities in Texas were named "Cottonwood." A post office was located there from 1895 until 1906. The town was also mentioned in the 1993 drama film A Perfect World where a suspect, Terry James Pugh, was found dead near this area.
