= Chula Vista-Orason, Texas =

- Former CDP

- Location within the state of Texas
- Coordinates: 26°4′27″N 97°26′34″W
- Country: United States
- State: Texas
- County: Cameron

Area
  - Total: 0.50 sq mi (1.3 km^{2})
  - Land: 0.50 sq mi (1.3 km^{2})
  - Water: 0 sq mi (0.0 km^{2})

Population (2000)
  - Total: 394
  - Density: 779/sq mi (300.6/km^{2})
- Time zone: UTC-6 (Central (CST))
  - Summer (DST): UTC-5 (CDT)
- FIPS code: 48-14885

Chula Vista-Orason was a census-designated place (CDP) in Cameron County, Texas, United States. The population was 394 at the 2000 census. For the 2010 census the area was split into two CDPs, Chula Vista and Orason. The communities are part of the Brownsville–Harlingen Metropolitan Statistical Area.

== Geography ==
The Chula Vista-Orason CDP was located at 26°4′27″N 97°26′34″W (26.074144, -97.442793).

According to the United States Census Bureau, the CDP had a total area of 0.5 square miles (1.3 km^{2}), all of it land.

== Demographics ==
Historical population
Census	Pop.	Note	%±
2000	394		—
U.S. Decennial Census; 1850–1900 1910; 1920 1930 1940; 1950 1960 1970; 1980 1990 2000; 2010

Chula Vista-Orason first appeared as a census designated place in the 2000 U.S. census. Prior to the 2010 U.S. census, it was split into the Chula Vista and Orason CDPs.

=== 2000 census ===
Chula Vista-Orason CDP, Texas – Racial and ethnic composition Note: the US Census treats Hispanic/Latino as an ethnic category. This table excludes Latinos from the racial categories and assigns them to a separate category. Hispanics/Latinos may be of any race.
Race / Ethnicity (NH = Non-Hispanic)	Pop 2000	% 2000
White alone (NH)	34	8.63%
Black or African American alone (NH)	0	0.00%
Native American or Alaska Native alone (NH)	0	0.00%
Asian alone (NH)	0	0.00%
Pacific Islander alone (NH)	0	0.00%
Other race alone (NH)	0	0.00%
Mixed race or Multiracial (NH)	0	0.00%
Hispanic or Latino (any race)	360	91.37%
Total	394	100.00%

As of the census of 2000, there were 394 people, 94 households, and 83 families residing in the CDP. The population density was 778.5 inhabitants per square mile (300.6/km^{2}). There were 107 housing units at an average density of 211.4 per square mile (81.6/km^{2}). The racial makeup of the CDP was 91.37% White, 1.78% African American, 0.25% Native American, 4.06% from other races, and 2.54% from two or more races. Hispanic or Latino of any race were 91.37% of the population.

There were 94 households, out of which 64.9% had children under the age of 18 living with them, 73.4% were married couples living together, 11.7% had a female householder with no husband present, and 11.7% were non-families. 10.6% of all households were made up of individuals, and 1.1% had someone living alone who was 65 years of age or older. The average household size was 4.19 and the average family size was 4.54.

In the CDP, the population was spread out, with 38.6% under the age of 18, 13.7% from 18 to 24, 27.9% from 25 to 44, 15.2% from 45 to 64, and 4.6% who were 65 years of age or older. The median age was 24 years. For every 100 females, there were 127.7 males. For every 100 females age 18 and over, there were 110.4 males.

The median income for a household in the CDP was $21,500, and the median income for a family was $23,571. Males had a median income of $21,625 versus $28,750 for females. The per capita income for the CDP was $8,167. About 44.4% of families and 48.5% of the population were below the poverty line, including 39.1% of those under age 18 and none of those age 65 or over.

== Education ==
Chula Vista and Orason are served by the Los Fresnos Consolidated Independent School District.

In addition, South Texas Independent School District operates magnet schools that serve the communities.
