= McKnight, Texas =

Unincorporated community in Rusk County, Texas, United States

- Unincorporated community
- Location within Texas Location within the United States
- Coordinates: 32°00′16″N 94°54′21″W
- Country: United States
- State: Texas
- County: Rusk
- Elevation: 384 ft (117 m)
- Time zone: UTC-6 (Central (CST))
  - Summer (DST): UTC-5 (CDT)
- GNIS feature ID: 1378657

McKnight is an unincorporated community in Rusk County, Texas, United States. It is located at the junction of Farm to Market Road 839 and Farm to Market Road 1798.

== See also ==
- List of unincorporated communities in Texas
