= Friendship, Texas =

Coordinates: 31.1902°N 95.1757°W

Friendship was a town in Trinity County, Texas, United States. It was established around the Civil War era. No population estimates are available, but the settlement appears on most highway maps.
