= Rehburg, Texas =

Rehburg
- Unincorporated community
- Interactive map of Rehburg
- Location within Texas Rehburg (the United States)
- Coordinates: 30°15′17″N 96°33′45″W
- Country: United States
- State: Texas
- County: Washington County

Rehburg, also known as Rehburg Settlement, is an unincorporated community located in Washington County, Texas, United States.

== History ==
It was founded in 1847 by German immigrants. A post office called Menlow was established in 1898, and remained in operation until 1905.
