= Jordan, Texas =

- Unincorporated community
- Location within Texas Location within the United States
- Coordinates: 29°56′27″N 97°21′17″W
- Country: United States
- State: Texas
- County: Bastrop
- Elevation: 436 ft (133 m)
- Time zone: UTC-6 (Central (CST))
  - Summer (DST): UTC-5 (CDT)
- Area codes: 512 & 737
- GNIS feature ID: 1380013

Jordan is an unincorporated community in Bastrop County, Texas, United States.

== Schools ==
Jordan is served by the Bastrop Independent School District.
