= Denson Springs, Texas =

Denson Springs
- Unincorporated community
- Location within Texas Location within the United States
- Coordinates: 31°37′45.2″N 95°22′26.8″W
- Country: United States
- State: Texas
- County: Anderson
- Settled: 1835
- Founded: 1878

Population (2000)
  - Total: 100
- Time zone: UTC-6 (Central (CST))
  - Summer (DST): UTC-5 (CDT)
- ZIP code: 75844
- Area codes: 903 & 430

Denson Springs is an unincorporated community in Anderson County, in the U.S. state of Texas. According to the Handbook of Texas, the community had a population of 100 in 2000. It is a part of the Palestine, Texas micropolitan area.

== History ==
This area, originally called Ioni after a nearby native village, was granted to James Bradshaw in 1835. Upon his death in 1844, it was inherited by his brother, William Bradshaw, whose family arrived in 1849. In 1878, the growing community was renamed after William's daughter, Nancy Anne Denson, widow of William Denson.

The community had a post office from 1893 to 1918. It has a population of 100 in 2000.

== Geography ==
Denson Springs is located next to Dream Lake along Texas State Highway 294, 18 mi (29 km) southeast of Palestine in the southeastern portion of Anderson County.

== Education ==
The community's first school, called Grayson School, was located on the "old Grayson place". (Note: Dr. and Mrs. Grayson were murdered in 1878 at their home, for shielding some African Americans in their employ from "kukluxers".) It was one of the largest schools in Anderson County before the American Civil War, (Note: Dr. Grayson moved to Anderson in 1866, and acquired the land with the schoolhouse in 1867, so it was not called Grayson School until after the Civil War. Previously it was on William Bradshaw's land in the district called Ioni.) and the schoolhouse was also used as a Baptist church. It moved into Denson Springs in 1887 (Note: The county history reports the school moved in 1878 on petition of L. C. Watkins on page 81, but reports the school moved in 1887 on page 144. As L. C. Watkins moved to Elkhart in 1882, the 1878 date seems more likely. 1878 is also the year Dr. and Mrs. Grayson were murdered across the street from the schoolhouse and their property became tied up in probate court.) and remained until well after 1936. In 1934, it had two teachers and 46 students. In 1955, the community's school was joined up with the Slocum Independent School District.
