= Anderson Mill, Austin, Texas =

Anderson Mill, Texas
- Former CDP
- Interactive map of Anderson Mill, Texas
- Coordinates: 30°27′18″N 97°48′33″W
- Country: United States
- State: Texas
- Counties: Williamson, Travis

Area
  - Total: 1.4 sq mi (3.7 km^{2})
  - Land: 1.4 sq mi (3.7 km^{2})
  - Water: 0 sq mi (0.0 km^{2})
- Elevation: 958 ft (292 m)

Population (2000)
  - Total: 8,953
  - Density: 6,343/sq mi (2,449.2/km^{2})
- Time zone: UTC-6 (Central (CST))
  - Summer (DST): UTC-5 (CDT)
- FIPS code: 48-03197
- GNIS feature ID: 1867541

Anderson Mill is a neighborhood of Austin and a former census-designated place (CDP) in Travis and Williamson counties in the U.S. state of Texas. The population was 7,199 at the 2010 census.

== Geography ==
Anderson Mill is located at 30°27′18″N 97°48′33″W (30.455050, -97.809262). This is about 13 miles (21 km) north of downtown Austin. It borders the Anderson Mill road which is named after the same mill as the neighborhood.

According to the United States Census Bureau, the CDP has a total area of 1.4 square miles (3.6 km^{2}), all land.

== History ==
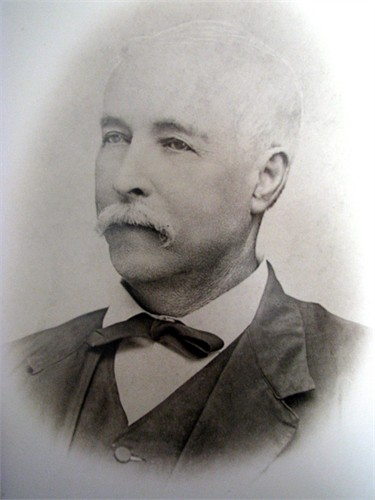
Thomas Anderson, the namesake of Anderson Mill.

Anderson Mill is named after Thomas Anderson. He moved from Virginia to Texas in the 1850s. In the 1860s he set up a mill there to make gunpowder for the Confederate Army.

After the war Anderson converted the mill to a gristmill. He later also started a cotton gin. In 1884 the area had a population of 30. It had received a post office in 1876 but this office was discontinued in 1884. After Anderson's death in 1894 the community was abandoned. In 1936 a historical marker was placed to mark the spot. It was not until the late 20th century with the growth of the area as a suburb of Austin that Anderson Mill came back into existence.

The area was included in a municipal utility district (MUD) in 1973, which was first named the Williamson County Municipal Utility District Number 1. The first houses were built in 1975, and construction continued into 1985 with the completion of approximately 3400 homes. In 1988, at the MUD's request, the Texas Water Commission approved a name change to the Anderson Mill Municipal Utility District. The district provided water, wastewater, trash collection. parks and recreation facilities and services. The area has seven neighborhood parks, two junior olympic swimming pools, eight lighted tennis courts, six extensive playscapes, two basketball courts, three sand volleyball courts, six pavilions of various sizes, an athletic field with both soccer and softball fields and nearly six miles of hike and bike trails that meander through the neighborhood following Lake Creek and its tributaries. In 2008, the growing City of Austin annexed the MUD and took over the water and wastewater services. An agreement with the City of Austin and the MUD allowed the residents of the district to voted to create the Anderson Mill Limited District which would retain possession of all the park and recreation facilities. The Limited District would maintain all the park and recreation facilities and provide recreation services to district residents. This service would be supported by both activity fees and a property tax.

== Incorporation into the City of Austin ==
On December 31, 2008, the City of Austin incorporated Anderson Mill into its city limits.

== Demographics ==
Historical population
Census	Pop.	Note	%±
1990	9,468		—
2000	8,953		−5.4%
U.S. Decennial Census; 1850–1900 1910; 1920 1930 1940; 1950 1960 1970; 1980 1990 2000; 2010

Anderson Mill first appeared as a census designated place in the 1990 U.S. census. It was annexed to the city of Austin, Texas prior to the 2010 U.S. census

Anderson Mill CDP, Texas – Racial and ethnic composition Note: the US Census treats Hispanic/Latino as an ethnic category. This table excludes Latinos from the racial categories and assigns them to a separate category. Hispanics/Latinos may be of any race.
Race / Ethnicity (NH = Non-Hispanic)	Pop 2000	% 2000
White alone (NH)	6,621	73.95%
Black or African American alone (NH)	362	4.04%
Native American or Alaska Native alone (NH)	31	0.35%
Asian alone (NH)	406	4.53%
Pacific Islander alone (NH)	7	0.08%
Other race alone (NH)	8	0.09%
Mixed race or Multiracial (NH)	195	2.18%
Hispanic or Latino (any race)	1,323	14.78%
Total	8,953	100.00%

As of the census of 2000, there were 8,953 people, 3,310 households, and 2,429 families residing in the CDP. The population density was 6,343.3 inhabitants per square mile (2,449.2/km^{2}). There were 3,383 housing units at an average density of 2,396.9 per square mile (925.4/km^{2}). The racial makeup of the CDP was 83.25% White, 4.07% African American, 0.49% Native American, 4.58% Asian, 0.16% Pacific Islander, 4.11% from other races, and 3.35% from two or more races. Hispanic or Latino of any race were 14.78% of the population.

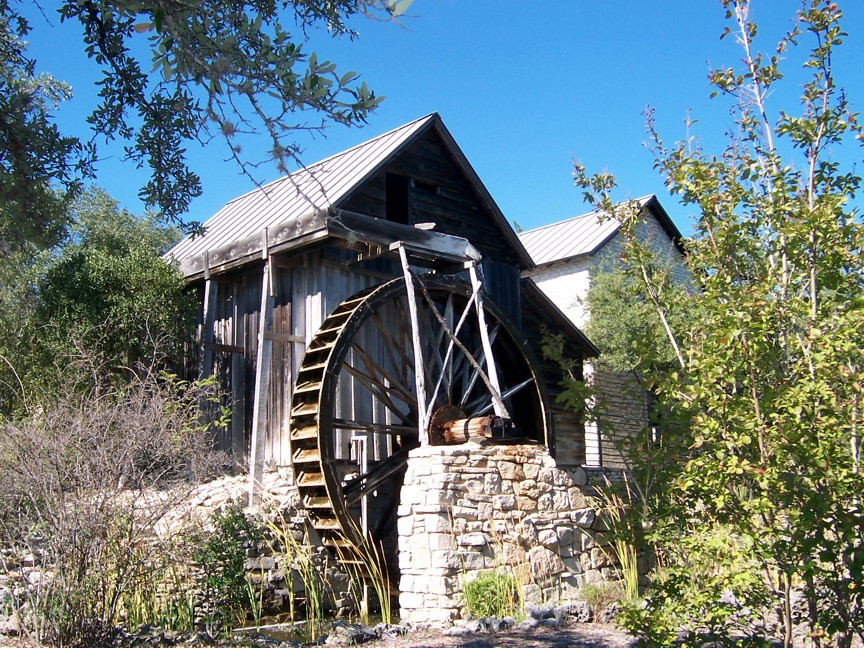
The Anderson Mill is a replica of the structure that gave the town its name

There were 3,310 households, out of which 40.8% had children under the age of 18 living with them, 54.9% were married couples living together, 14.3% had a female householder with no husband present, and 26.6% were non-families. 18.7% of all households were made up of individuals, and 3.7% had someone living alone who was 65 years of age or older. The average household size was 2.69 and the average family size was 3.09.

In the CDP, the population was spread out, with 27.6% under the age of 18, 10.4% from 18 to 24, 33.1% from 25 to 44, 22.8% from 45 to 64, and 6.1% who were 65 years of age or older. The median age was 33 years. For every 100 females, there were 96.4 males. For every 100 females age 18 and over, there were 92.5 males.

The median income for a household in the CDP was $55,314, and the median income for a family was $59,821. Males had a median income of $41,125 versus $31,028 for females. The per capita income for the CDP was $24,191. About 3.8% of families and 5.1% of the population were below the poverty line, including 5.8% of those under age 18 and 1.8% of those age 65 or over.

== Education ==
Anderson Mill contains several schools of which are a part of Round Rock Independent School District.

Residents are divided between Anderson Mill Elementary and Purple Sage Elementary. All residents are zoned to Noel Grisham Middle School and Westwood High School.
