= Ranchitos del Norte, Texas =

- CDP
- Location within Texas
- Coordinates: 26°24′1″N 98°52′17″W
- Country: United States
- State: Texas
- County: Starr

Area
  - Total: 0.4 sq mi (1.0 km^{2})
  - Land: 0.4 sq mi (1.0 km^{2})
  - Water: 0.0 sq mi (0 km^{2})

Population (2020)
  - Total: 214
  - Density: 540/sq mi (210/km^{2})
- Time zone: UTC-6 (Central (CST))
  - Summer (DST): UTC-5 (CDT)
- Zip Code: 78582

Ranchitos del Norte is a census-designated place (CDP) in Starr County, Texas, United States. It was a new CDP for the 2010 census. As of the 2020 census, Ranchitos del Norte had a population of 214. Parts of this new CDP were formed from the former Los Villareales CDP.

== Geography ==
Ranchitos del Norte is located at 26°24′1″N 98°52′17″W (26.400351, -98.871492).

== Demographics ==
Historical population
Census	Pop.	Note	%±
2010	112		—
2020	214		91.1%
U.S. Decennial Census; 1850–1900 1910; 1920 1930 1940; 1950 1960 1970; 1980 1990 2000; 2010

Ranchitos del Norte was formed prior to the 2010 U.S. census, one of five CDPs (La Escondida, La Esperanza, Santel, Mi Ranchito Estate, Ranchitos del Norte) formed in full or in part out of the deleted Los Villareales CDP.

=== 2020 census ===
Mi Ranchito Estate CDP, Texas – Racial and ethnic composition Note: the US Census treats Hispanic/Latino as an ethnic category. This table excludes Latinos from the racial categories and assigns them to a separate category. Hispanics/Latinos may be of any race.
Race / Ethnicity (NH = Non-Hispanic)	Pop 2010	Pop 2020	% 2010	% 2020
White alone (NH)	0	1	0.00%	0.47%
Black or African American alone (NH)	0	0	0.00%	0.00%
Native American or Alaska Native alone (NH)	0	0	0.00%	0.00%
Asian alone (NH)	0	0	0.00%	0.00%
Pacific Islander alone (NH)	0	0	0.00%	0.00%
Some Other Race alone (NH)	0	0	0.00%	0.00%
Mixed Race or Multi-Racial (NH)	0	0	0.00%	0.00%
Hispanic or Latino (any race)	112	213	100.00%	99.53%
Total	112	214	100.00%	100.00%

== Education ==
The CDP is within the Rio Grande City Grulla Independent School District (formerly Rio Grande City Consolidated Independent School District)
