= Mi Ranchito Estate, Texas =

- CDP
- Interactive map of Mi Ranchito Estate, Texas
- Coordinates: 26°23′16″N 98°52′24″W
- Country: United States
- State: Texas
- County: Starr

Area
  - Total: 0.3 sq mi (0.78 km^{2})
  - Land: 0.3 sq mi (0.78 km^{2})
  - Water: 0.0 sq mi (0 km^{2})

Population (2020)
  - Total: 409
  - Density: 1,400/sq mi (530/km^{2})
- Time zone: UTC-6 (Central (CST))
  - Summer (DST): UTC-5 (CDT)
- Zip Code: 78582

Mi Ranchito Estate is a census-designated place (CDP) in Starr County, Texas, United States. It was first listed as a CDP for the 2010 census. Parts of this new CDP were formed from the former Los Villareales CDP. As of the 2020 census, Mi Ranchito Estate had a population of 409.

== Geography ==
Mi Ranchito Estate is located at 26°23′16″N 98°52′24″W (26.387810, -98.873329).

== Demographics ==
Historical population
| Census | Pop. | Note | %± |
|---|---|---|---|
| 2010 | 281 | | — |
| 2020 | 409 | | 45.6% |
U.S. Decennial Census; 1850–1900 1910; 1920 1930 1940; 1950 1960 1970; 1980 1990 2000; 2010 2020

Mi Ranchito Estate was formed prior to the 2010 U.S. census, one of five CDPs (La Escondida, La Esperanza, Santel, Mi Ranchito Estate, Ranchitos del Norte) formed in full or in part out of the deleted Los Villareales CDP.

=== 2020 census ===
Mi Ranchito Estate CDP, Texas – Racial and ethnic composition Note: the US Census treats Hispanic/Latino as an ethnic category. This table excludes Latinos from the racial categories and assigns them to a separate category. Hispanics/Latinos may be of any race.
| Race / Ethnicity (NH = Non-Hispanic) | Pop 2010 | Pop 2020 | % 2010 | % 2020 |
|---|---|---|---|---|
| White alone (NH) | 0 | 5 | 0.00% | 1.22% |
| Black or African American alone (NH) | 0 | 0 | 0.00% | 0.00% |
| Native American or Alaska Native alone (NH) | 0 | 1 | 0.00% | 0.24% |
| Asian alone (NH) | 0 | 0 | 0.00% | 0.00% |
| Pacific Islander alone (NH) | 0 | 0 | 0.00% | 0.00% |
| Some Other Race alone (NH) | 0 | 0 | 0.00% | 0.00% |
| Mixed Race or Multi-Racial (NH) | 0 | 1 | 0.00% | 0.24% |
| Hispanic or Latino (any race) | 281 | 402 | 100.00% | 98.29% |
| Total | 281 | 409 | 100.00% | 100.00% |

== Education ==
The CDP is within the Rio Grande City Grulla Independent School District (formerly Rio Grande City Consolidated Independent School District).
