= La Escondida, Texas =

- CDP
- Interactive map of La Escondida, Texas
- Coordinates: 26°22′50″N 98°52′25″W
- Country: United States
- State: Texas
- County: Starr

Area
  - Total: 0.1 sq mi (0.26 km^{2})
  - Land: 0.1 sq mi (0.26 km^{2})
  - Water: 0.0 sq mi (0 km^{2})

Population (2020)
  - Total: 183
  - Density: 1,800/sq mi (710/km^{2})
- Time zone: UTC-6 (Central (CST))
  - Summer (DST): UTC-5 (CDT)
- Zip Code: 78582

La Escondida is a census-designated place (CDP) in Starr County, Texas, United States. It is a new CDP, formed from part of the former Los Villareales CDP prior to the 2010 census. As of the 2020 census, La Escondida had a population of 183.

== Geography ==
La Escondida is located at 26°22′50″N 98°52′25″W (26.380650, -98.873727).

== Demographics ==
Historical population
Census	Pop.	Note	%±
2010	153		—
2020	183		19.6%
U.S. Decennial Census; 1850–1900 1910; 1920 1930 1940; 1950 1960 1970; 1980 1990 2000; 2010 2020

La Escondida was formed prior to the 2010 U.S. census, one of five CDPs (La Escondida, La Esperanza, Santel, Mi Ranchito Estate, Ranchitos del Norte) formed in full or in part out of the deleted Los Villareales CDP.

=== 2020 census ===
La Escondida CDP, Texas – Racial and ethnic composition Note: the US Census treats Hispanic/Latino as an ethnic category. This table excludes Latinos from the racial categories and assigns them to a separate category. Hispanics/Latinos may be of any race.
Race / Ethnicity (NH = Non-Hispanic)	Pop 2010	Pop 2020	% 2010	% 2020
White alone (NH)	0	0	0.00%	0.00%
Black or African American alone (NH)	0	0	0.00%	0.00%
Native American or Alaska Native alone (NH)	0	0	0.00%	0.00%
Asian alone (NH)	0	0	0.00%	0.00%
Pacific Islander alone (NH)	0	0	0.00%	0.00%
Some Other Race alone (NH)	0	0	0.00%	0.00%
Mixed Race or Multi-Racial (NH)	0	0	0.00%	0.00%
Hispanic or Latino (any race)	153	183	100.00%	100.00%
Total	153	183	100.00%	100.00%

== Education ==
The CDP is within the Rio Grande City Grulla Independent School District (formerly Rio Grande City Consolidated Independent School District)
