= Santa Cruz, Starr County, Texas =

Census-designated place in Texas, US

Santa Cruz, Texas
- Census-designated place
- Location in Texas
- Coordinates: 26°21′13″N 98°46′3″W
- Country: United States
- State: Texas
- County: Starr

Population (2020)
  - Total: 74
- Time zone: UTC-6 (Central (CST))
  - Summer (DST): UTC-5 (CDT)
- Zip Code: 78582

Santa Cruz is a census-designated place (CDP) in Starr County, Texas, United States.

It was formed for the 2010 census with a population of 54. There is a former CDP of the same name (Santa Cruz CDP) that was split prior to the 2010 census into the El Chaparral and Santa Rosa CDPs.

== Geography ==
Santa Cruz is located at 26°21′13″N 98°46′3″W (26.353689, -98.767615).

== Demographics ==
Historical population
Census	Pop.	Note	%±
2010	54		—
2020	74		37.0%
U.S. Decennial Census; 1850–1900 1910; 1920 1930 1940; 1950 1960 1970; 1980 1990 2000; 2010 2020

Santa Cruz first appeared as a census designated place in the 2010 U.S. census.

=== 2020 census ===
Santa Cruz CDP, Texas – Racial and ethnic composition Note: the US Census treats Hispanic/Latino as an ethnic category. This table excludes Latinos from the racial categories and assigns them to a separate category. Hispanics/Latinos may be of any race.
Race / Ethnicity (NH = Non-Hispanic)	Pop 2010	Pop 2020	% 2010	% 2020
White alone (NH)	0	6	0.00%	8.11%
Black or African American alone (NH)	0	0	0.00%	0.00%
Native American or Alaska Native alone (NH)	0	0	0.00%	0.00%
Asian alone (NH)	0	0	0.00%	0.00%
Native Hawaiian or Pacific Islander alone (NH)	0	0	0.00%	0.00%
Other race alone (NH)	0	0	0.00%	0.00%
Mixed race or Multiracial (NH)	0	0	0.00%	0.00%
Hispanic or Latino (any race)	54	68	100.00%	91.89%
Total	54	74	100.00%	100.00%
