= Chula Vista, Cameron County, Texas =

Chula Vista, Texas
- Census-Designated Place
- Location within Texas
- Coordinates: 26°04′26″N 97°26′23″W
- Country: United States
- State: Texas
- County: Cameron
- Elevation: 16 ft (5 m)

Population (2020)
  - Total: 257
- Time zone: UTC-6 (Central (CST))
  - Summer (DST): UTC-5 (CDT)
- ZIP codes: 78834
- Area code: 956
- GNIS feature ID: 2584621

Chula Vista is a census-designated place (CDP) in Cameron County, in the U.S. state of Texas. Prior to the 2010 census, the community was part of the Chula Vista-Orason CDP. It is part of the Brownsville–Harlingen Metropolitan Statistical Area.

== Geography ==
Chula Vista is near the geographic center of Cameron County, 2 miles (3 km) east of Los Fresnos and 15 miles (24 km) north of the center of Brownsville. It is bordered on the west by Orason.

== Demographics ==
Historical population
Census	Pop.	Note	%±
2010	288		—
2020	257		−10.8%
U.S. Decennial Census; 1850–1900 1910; 1920 1930 1940; 1950 1960 1970; 1980 1990 2000; 2010

Chula Vista first appeared as a census designated place in the 2010 U.S. census after the Chula Vista-Orason CDP was split into the Chula Vista and Orason CDPs.

=== 2020 census ===
Chula Vista CDP (Cameron County), Texas – Racial and ethnic composition Note: the US Census treats Hispanic/Latino as an ethnic category. This table excludes Latinos from the racial categories and assigns them to a separate category. Hispanics/Latinos may be of any race.
Race / Ethnicity (NH = Non-Hispanic)	Pop 2010	Pop 2020	% 2010	% 2020
White alone (NH)	8	7	2.78%	2.72%
Black or African American alone (NH)	0	0	0.00%	0.00%
Native American or Alaska Native alone (NH)	0	0	0.00%	0.00%
Asian alone (NH)	0	0	0.00%	0.00%
Native Hawaiian or Pacific Islander alone (NH)	0	0	0.00%	0.00%
Other race alone (NH)	0	0	0.00%	0.00%
Mixed race or Multiracial (NH)	0	2	0.00%	0.78%
Hispanic or Latino (any race)	280	248	97.22%	96.50%
Total	288	257	100.00%	100.00%
