= New Harmony, Texas =

- Unincorporated community
- Location within Texas Location within the United States
- Coordinates: 32°24′52″N 95°27′58″W
- Country: United States
- State: Texas
- County: Smith
- Elevation: 492 ft (150 m)
- Time zone: UTC-6 (Central (CST))
  - Summer (DST): UTC-5 (CDT)
- Area codes: 430 & 903
- GNIS feature ID: 1378739

New Harmony is an unincorporated community in Smith County, located in the U.S. state of Texas. The community is centered around the historic 155 year old New Harmony Baptist Church.

== History ==
New Harmony was organized in 1867 after the Civil War had ended and 18 adults realized that their families needed a new place of worship after the Dean community near the Dixie area had disbanded. The 18 adults and one child met on April 20, 1867, and organized the church they called Harmony, approximately 12 miles northwest of Tyler, Texas. Soon they petitioned the Cherokee Baptist Association for membership and learned there was already a church by that name. The members resubmitted the petition and were accepted under the name of "New Harmony Baptist Church".

The first church house was built on the site that later became the New Harmony Cemetery. A second church house was built across the road from that first church. Natural springs behind the church provided baptismal waters. On December 21, 1907, the church family moved into a third building on the same site. A storm damaged that building in 1915, and a fourth church building was erected at a total cost of $330.35. This building served as the worship center for 34 years. The fifth church building was erected in 1949. Since then, there have been seven major additions including a new sanctuary constructed in 1993. The old sanctuary was retained for Sunday School rooms and a library. Having only 37 pastors in its 150-year history, and only 2 pastors in the last 50 years, New Harmony has been greatly blessed by God.

Within the church walls, individual members have had a refuge to grow spiritually. Collectively, the church has shared the gospel of Jesus' saving grace and peace on local, state, national, and world levels. Living through World War I and World War II and the wars of Korea, Vietnam, The Gulf, and Iraq, the church has kept a strong faith. History records a praying church for the 40 members who served during World War II and the safe return of every soldier. Prayers for local church members and the needs of neighbors and nations have never ceased. A history of 150 years for the church reveal many personal, local and national challenges that were met as members stood firm on Biblical principles and compassion for mankind. The church has relied on the truth in the scriptures during struggles and hard times and has remembered God as The Source during times of prosperity. New Harmony has never been without faith in God who promised, "If my people which are called by my name shall humble themselves, and pray, and seek my face, and turn from their wicked ways; then will I hear from heaven and will forgive their sin, and will heal their land" (II Chronicles 7:14).
