= Telephone, Texas =

- Unincorporated community
- Location within the state of Texas Telephone (the United States)
- Coordinates: 33°46′52″N 96°01′05″W
- Country: United States
- State: Texas
- County: Fannin

Population (2010)
  - Total: 210
- Time zone: UTC-6 (Central (CST))
  - Summer (DST): UTC-5 (CDT)
- ZIP codes: 75488
- Area codes: 903, 430
- GNIS feature ID: 1369685

Telephone is an unincorporated community in Fannin County, Texas, United States. According to the Handbook of Texas, the community had an estimated population of 210 in 2010.

== Geography ==
Telephone is situated at the junction of Farm Roads 273 and 2029 in northeastern Fannin County, approximately 17 miles northeast of Bonham and 32 miles northeast of Sherman.

== History ==
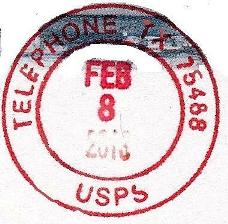
Telephone, TX postmark

Although the first settlers arrived in the area during the 1870s, a community did not develop until the mid-1880s. The community received its name because the only telephone in the area was located in a general store owned by Pete Hindman. When Hindman applied for permission to open a post office, authorities repeatedly refused his submissions because the suggested names were already used by other post offices in the state. He finally submitted the name Telephone, which was accepted, and the post office opened in 1886. By 1890, Telephone had an estimated population of 30. The community continued to grow and by the outbreak of World War I, the number of residents had increased to 100. Unlike many rural communities in Texas during the Great Depression, Telephone's population remained stable at around 100. By the mid-1940s, the community had ten businesses and 280 residents. In 1990, Telephone had six businesses, a post office, and an estimated population of 210. That figure remained unchanged as of 2000, and still remains unchanged as of 2010.

Telephone has a post office with the ZIP code 75488.

== Education ==
Public education in the community of Telephone is provided by the Sam Rayburn Independent School District.
