= La Esperanza, Texas =

- CDP
- Interactive map of La Esperanza, Texas
- Coordinates: 26°25′53″N 98°53′32″W
- Country: United States
- State: Texas
- County: Starr

Population (2020)
  - Total: 217
- Time zone: UTC-6 (Central (CST))
  - Summer (DST): UTC-5 (CDT)
- Zip Code: 78582

La Esperanza is a census-designated place (CDP) in Starr County, Texas, United States. It is a new CDP, formed from part of the former Los Villareales CDP prior to the 2010 census. As of the 2020 census, La Esperanza had a population of 217.

== Geography ==
La Esperanza is located at 26°25′53″N 98°53′32″W (26.431313, -98.892272).

== Demographics ==
Historical population
Census	Pop.	Note	%±
2010	229		—
2020	217		−5.2%
U.S. Decennial Census; 1850–1900 1910; 1920 1930 1940; 1950 1960 1970; 1980 1990 2000; 2010 2020

La Esperanza was formed prior to the 2010 U.S. census, one of five CDPs (La Escondida, La Esperanza, Santel, Mi Ranchito Estate, Ranchitos del Norte) formed in full or in part out of the deleted Los Villareales CDP.

=== 2020 census ===
La Esperanza CDP, Texas – Racial and ethnic composition Note: the US Census treats Hispanic/Latino as an ethnic category. This table excludes Latinos from the racial categories and assigns them to a separate category. Hispanics/Latinos may be of any race.
Race / Ethnicity (NH = Non-Hispanic)	Pop 2010	Pop 2020	% 2010	% 2020
White alone (NH)	7	2	3.06%	0.92%
Black or African American alone (NH)	0	0	0.00%	0.00%
Native American or Alaska Native alone (NH)	0	0	0.00%	0.00%
Asian alone (NH)	0	0	0.00%	0.00%
Pacific Islander alone (NH)	0	0	0.00%	0.00%
Some Other Race alone (NH)	0	3	0.00%	1.38%
Mixed Race or Multi-Racial (NH)	0	1	0.00%	0.46%
Hispanic or Latino (any race)	222	211	96.94%	97.24%
Total	229	217	100.00%	100.00%

== Education ==
The CDP is within the Roma Independent School District.
