= Hilltop, Texas =

- Census-designated place
- Coordinates: 28°41′38″N 99°10′34″W
- Country: United States
- State: Texas
- County: Frio

Area
  - Total: 1.25 sq mi (3.25 km^{2})
  - Land: 1.25 sq mi (3.25 km^{2})
  - Water: 0 sq mi (0.0 km^{2})
- Elevation: 515 ft (157 m)

Population (2020)
  - Total: 356
  - Density: 284/sq mi (110/km^{2})
- Time zone: UTC-6 (Central (CST))
  - Summer (DST): UTC-5 (CDT)
- FIPS code: 48-34130
- GNIS feature ID: 2408390

Hilltop is an unincorporated community and census-designated place (CDP) in Frio County, Texas, United States. Its population was 356 at the 2020 census.

== Geography ==
Hilltop is located in southern Frio County. It is bordered to the south by the city of Dilley. Interstate 35 forms the southeastern edge of the CDP, with access from Exits 85 and 86. I-35 leads north 15 mi (24 km) to Pearsall, the Frio County seat, and south past Dilley 18 mi (29 km) to Cotulla.

According to the United States Census Bureau, the Hilltop CDP has a total area of 1.25 sq mi (3.25 km^{2}), all land.

== Demographics ==
Historical population
| Census | Pop. | Note | %± |
|---|---|---|---|
| 2000 | 300 | | — |
| 2010 | 287 | | −4.3% |
| 2020 | 356 | | 24.0% |
U.S. Decennial Census; 1850–1900 1910; 1920 1930 1940; 1950 1960 1970; 1980 1990 2000; 2010 2020

Hilltop first appeared as a census designated place in the 2000 U.S. census.

=== 2020 census ===
Hilltop CDP, Texas – Racial and ethnic composition Note: the US Census treats Hispanic/Latino as an ethnic category. This table excludes Latinos from the racial categories and assigns them to a separate category. Hispanics/Latinos may be of any race.
| Race / Ethnicity (NH = Non-Hispanic) | Pop 2000 | Pop 2010 | Pop 2020 | % 2000 | % 2010 | % 2020 |
|---|---|---|---|---|---|---|
| White alone (NH) | 30 | 21 | 21 | 10.00% | 7.32% | 5.90% |
| Black or African American alone (NH) | 0 | 0 | 1 | 0.00% | 0.00% | 0.28% |
| Native American or Alaska Native alone (NH) | 0 | 0 | 0 | 0.00% | 0.00% | 0.00% |
| Asian alone (NH) | 0 | 0 | 1 | 0.00% | 0.00% | 0.28% |
| Native Hawaiian or Pacific Islander alone (NH) | 0 | 0 | 0 | 0.00% | 0.00% | 0.00% |
| Other race alone (NH) | 0 | 3 | 0 | 0.00% | 1.05% | 0.00% |
| Mixed race or Multiracial (NH) | 0 | 1 | 5 | 0.00% | 0.35% | 1.40% |
| Hispanic or Latino (any race) | 270 | 262 | 328 | 90.00% | 91.29% | 92.13% |
| Total | 300 | 287 | 356 | 100.00% | 100.00% | 100.00% |

=== 2000 census ===
As of the census of 2000, 300 people, 83 households, and 75 families were residing in the CDP. The population density was 251.5 people per mi^{2} (97.3/km^{2}). There were 101 housing units at an average density of 84.7 per square mile (32.7/km^{2}). The racial makeup of the CDP was 77.00% White, 21.67% from other races, and 1.33% from two or more races. Hispanics or Latinos of any race were 90.00% of the population.

Of the 83 households, 57.8% had children under the age of 18 living with them, 68.7% were married couples living together, 15.7% had a female householder with no husband present, and 9.6% were not families. About 8.4% of all households were made up of individuals, and 3.6% had someone living alone who was 65 years of age or older. The average household size was 3.61, and the average family size was 3.81.

In the CDP, the age distribution was 36.7% under 18, 11.3% from 18 to 24, 29.7% from 25 to 44, 15.0% from 45 to 64, and 7.3% who were 65 or older. The median age was 27 years. For every 100 females, there were 106.9 males. For every 100 females age 18 and over, there were 118.4 males.

The median income for a household in the CDP was $23,229, and for a family was $23,229. Males had a median income of $16,250 versus $7,045 for females. The per capita income for the CDP was $7,269. About 37.1% of families and 50.0% of the population were below the poverty line, including 73.0% of those under the age of 18 and 60.0% of those 65 or over.

== Education ==
Hilltop is served by the Dilley Independent School District.
