= Santel, Texas =

- CDP
- Interactive map of Santel, Texas
- Coordinates: 26°22′32″N 98°53′0″W
- Country: United States
- State: Texas
- County: Starr

Population (2020)
  - Total: 24
- Time zone: UTC-6 (Central (CST))
  - Summer (DST): UTC-5 (CDT)
- Zip Code: 78582

Santel is a census-designated place (CDP) in Starr County, Texas, United States. It is a new CDP, formed from part of the former Los Villareales CDP prior to the 2010 census. As of the 2020 census, Santel had a population of 24.

== Geography ==
Santel is located at 26°22′32″N 98°53′0″W (26.375560, -98.883283).

== Demographics ==
Historical population
Census	Pop.	Note	%±
2010	44		—
2020	24		−45.5%
U.S. Decennial Census; 1850–1900 1910; 1920 1930 1940; 1950 1960 1970; 1980 1990 2000; 2010

Santel was formed prior to the 2010 U.S. census, one of five CDPs (La Escondida, La Esperanza, Santel, Mi Ranchito Estate, Ranchitos del Norte) formed in full or in part out of the deleted Los Villareales CDP.

=== 2020 census ===
Santel CDP, Texas – Racial and ethnic composition Note: the US Census treats Hispanic/Latino as an ethnic category. This table excludes Latinos from the racial categories and assigns them to a separate category. Hispanics/Latinos may be of any race.
Race / Ethnicity (NH = Non-Hispanic)	Pop 2010	Pop 2020	% 2010	% 2020
White alone (NH)	1	0	2.27%	0.00%
Black or African American alone (NH)	0	0	0.00%	0.00%
Native American or Alaska Native alone (NH)	0	0	0.00%	0.00%
Asian alone (NH)	0	1	0.00%	4.17%
Native Hawaiian or Pacific Islander alone (NH)	0	0	0.00%	0.00%
Other race alone (NH)	0	0	0.00%	0.00%
Mixed race or Multiracial (NH)	0	0	0.00%	0.00%
Hispanic or Latino (any race)	43	23	97.73%	95.83%
Total	44	24	100.00%	100.00%

== Education ==
The CDP is within the Rio Grande City Grulla Independent School District (formerly Rio Grande City Consolidated Independent School District)
