= La Puerta, Texas =

- CDP
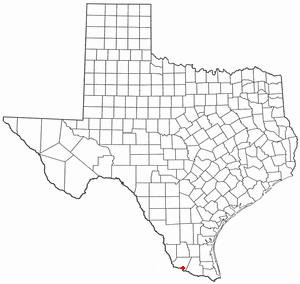
- Location of La Puerta, Texas

- Coordinates: 26°20′48.5″N 98°45′02″W
- Country: United States
- State: Texas
- County: Starr

Area
  - Total: 0.3 sq mi (0.78 km^{2})
  - Land: 0.3 sq mi (0.78 km^{2})
  - Water: 0.0 sq mi (0 km^{2})
- Elevation: 157 ft (48 m)

Population (2020)
  - Total: 638
  - Density: 2,100/sq mi (820/km^{2})
- Time zone: UTC-6 (Central (CST))
  - Summer (DST): UTC-5 (CDT)
- Zip Code: 78582
- FIPS code: 48-41458
- GNIS feature ID: 1339389

La Puerta is a census-designated place (CDP) in Starr County, Texas, United States. The population was 638 at the 2020 census, an increase from the figure of 632 tabulated in 2010 census.

== Geography ==
La Puerta is located at 26°20′48.5″N 98°45′02″W (26.346816, -98.750524).

Prior to the 2010 census, La Puerta CDP gained area, had parts taken to form new CDPs, and lost additional area. As a result, the total area was reduced to 0.3 square miles (0.8 km^{2}), all land.

== Demographics ==
Historical population
Census	Pop.	Note	%±
2000	1,636		—
2010	632		−61.4%
2020	638		0.9%
U.S. Decennial Census; 1850–1900 1910; 1920 1930 1940; 1950 1960 1970; 1980 1990 2000; 2010 2020

La Puerta first appeared as a census designated place in the 2000 U.S. census and was reduced in size prior to the 2010 U.S. census after 2 new CDPS (B and E, Garza-Salinas II) were carved out of its territory.

=== 2020 census ===
La Puerta CDP, Texas – Racial and ethnic composition Note: the US Census treats Hispanic/Latino as an ethnic category. This table excludes Latinos from the racial categories and assigns them to a separate category. Hispanics/Latinos may be of any race.
Race / Ethnicity (NH = Non-Hispanic)	Pop 2000	Pop 2010	Pop 2020	% 2000	% 2010	% 2020
White alone (NH)	20	8	4	1.22%	1.27%	0.63%
Black or African American alone (NH)	0	0	0	0.00%	0.00%	0.00%
Native American or Alaska Native alone (NH)	1	0	0	0.06%	0.00%	0.00%
Asian alone (NH)	0	0	0	0.00%	0.00%	0.00%
Pacific Islander alone (NH)	0	0	0	0.00%	0.00%	0.00%
Some Other Race alone (NH)	0	0	0	0.00%	0.00%	0.00%
Mixed race or Multiracial (NH)	0	0	3	0.00%	0.00%	0.47%
Hispanic or Latino (any race)	1,615	624	631	98.72%	98.73%	98.90%
Total	1,636	632	638	100.00%	100.00%	100.00%

At the 2000 census there were 1,636 people, 409 households, and 381 families living in the CDP. The population density was 1,911.9 inhabitants per square mile (738.2/km^{2}). There were 459 housing units at an average density of 536.4 per square mile (207.1/km^{2}). The racial makeup of the CDP was 97.68% White, 0.06% African American, 0.06% Native American, 0.06% Asian, 2.14% from other races. Hispanic or Latino of any race were 98.72%.

Of the 409 households 64.3% had children under the age of 18 living with them, 72.1% were married couples living together, 14.9% had a female householder with no husband present, and 6.8% were non-families. 6.4% of households were one person and 4.4% were one person aged 65 or older. The average household size was 4.00 and the average family size was 4.17.

The age distribution was 41.2% under the age of 18, 10.7% from 18 to 24, 29.5% from 25 to 44, 12.8% from 45 to 64, and 5.7% 65 or older. The median age was 24 years. For every 100 females, there were 91.8 males. For every 100 females age 18 and over, there were 90.5 males.

The median household income was $16,820 and the median family income was $17,281. Males had a median income of $15,820 versus $10,385 for females. The per capita income for the CDP was $4,507. About 48.9% of families and 48.9% of the population were below the poverty line, including 44.3% of those under age 18 and 53.6% of those age 65 or over.

== Education ==
La Puerta is served by the Rio Grande City Grulla Independent School District (formerly Rio Grande City Consolidated Independent School District)
