= Elwood, Texas =

Unincorporated community in Texas, US

Elwood, Fannin County, Texas
- Unincorporated community
- Location within the state of Texas
- Coordinates: 33°48′42″N 96°04′26″W
- Country: United States
- State: Texas
- County: Fannin
- Time zone: UTC-6 (Central (CST))
  - Summer (DST): UTC-5 (CDT)
- GNIS feature ID: 1379724

Elwood is an unincorporated community in Fannin County, Texas, United States.

== Education ==
The Sam Rayburn Independent School District serves area students.
