= Ivanhoe, Fannin County, Texas =

- Unincorporated community
- Location within the state of Texas Ivanhoe (the United States)
- Coordinates: 33°42′47″N 96°08′38″W
- Country: United States
- State: Texas
- County: Fannin
- Time zone: UTC-6 (Central (CST))
  - Summer (DST): UTC-5 (CDT)
- ZIP codes: 75447
- Area codes: 903, 430
- GNIS feature ID: 1382066

Ivanhoe is an unincorporated community in Fannin County, Texas, United States. It is located 10 miles (16 km) north of Bonham, the Fannin County seat.

The Sam Rayburn Independent School District serves area students.

Ivanhoe General Store is located in Ivanhoe, which also has a post office and a winery. Every October since 2011, Ivanhoe has put on a wine show.
