= Garza-Salinas II, Texas =

- CDP
- Interactive map of Garza-Salinas II, Texas
- Coordinates: 26°21′6″N 98°45′34″W
- Country: United States
- State: Texas
- County: Starr

Area
  - Total: 0.1 sq mi (0.26 km^{2})
  - Land: 0.1 sq mi (0.26 km^{2})
  - Water: 0.0 sq mi (0 km^{2})

Population (2010)
  - Total: 719
  - Density: 7,200/sq mi (2,800/km^{2})
- Time zone: UTC-6 (Central (CST))
  - Summer (DST): UTC-5 (CDT)
- Zip Code: 78582

Garza-Salinas II is a census-designated place (CDP) in Starr County, Texas, United States. It is a new CDP, formed from part of the La Puerta CDP prior to the 2010 census. As of the 2020 census, Garza-Salinas II had a population of 651.

== Geography ==
Garza-Salinas II is located at 26°21′6″N 98°45′34″W (26.351774, -98.759539).

== Demographics ==
Historical population
Census	Pop.	Note	%±
2010	719		—
2020	651		−9.5%
U.S. Decennial Census; 1850–1900 1910; 1920 1930 1940; 1950 1960 1970; 1980 1990 2000; 2010

Garza-Salinas II first appeared as a census designated place in the 2010 U.S. census, one of two CDPs (along with B and E) carved out from parts of the La Puerta CDP.

=== 2020 census ===
Garza-Salinas II CDP, Texas – Racial and ethnic composition Note: the US Census treats Hispanic/Latino as an ethnic category. This table excludes Latinos from the racial categories and assigns them to a separate category. Hispanics/Latinos may be of any race.
Race / Ethnicity (NH = Non-Hispanic)	Pop 2010	Pop 2020	% 2010	% 2020
White alone (NH)	0	13	0.00%	2.00%
Black or African American alone (NH)	0	1	0.00%	0.15%
Native American or Alaska Native alone (NH)	0	0	0.00%	0.00%
Asian alone (NH)	0	0	0.00%	0.00%
Pacific Islander alone (NH)	0	0	0.00%	0.00%
Some Other Race alone (NH)	0	0	0.00%	0.00%
Mixed Race or Multi-Racial (NH)	0	0	0.00%	0.00%
Hispanic or Latino (any race)	719	637	100.00%	97.85%
Total	719	651	100.00%	100.00%

== Education ==
The CDP is within the Rio Grande City Grulla Independent School District (formerly Rio Grande City Consolidated Independent School District)
