= Orason, Texas =

- Census-designated place
- Location within the state of Texas
- Coordinates: 26°4′28″N 97°26′41″W
- Country: United States
- State: Texas
- County: Cameron

Area
  - Total: 0.33 sq mi (0.85 km^{2})
  - Land: 0.33 sq mi (0.85 km^{2})
- Elevation: 18 ft (5.5 m)

Population (2020)
  - Total: 88
  - Density: 391/sq mi (150.9/km^{2})
- Time zone: UTC-6 (Central (CST))
  - Summer (DST): UTC-5 (CDT)
- FIPS code: 48-54186

Orason is a census-designated place (CDP) in Cameron County, in the U.S. state of Texas. As of the 2020 census, Orason had a population of 88. Prior to the 2010 census, the community was part of the Chula Vista-Orason CDP. It is part of the Brownsville–Harlingen Metropolitan Statistical Area.

== Geography ==
Orason is near the center of Cameron County, 2 miles (3 km) east of Los Fresnos and 15 miles (24 km) north of the center of Brownsville. It is bordered on the east by Chula Vista.

According to the United States Census Bureau, the Orason CDP has a total area of 0.33 square miles (0.85 km^{2}), all land.

== Demographics ==
Historical population
Census	Pop.	Note	%±
2010	129		—
2020	88		−31.8%
U.S. Decennial Census; 1850–1900 1910; 1920 1930 1940; 1950 1960 1970; 1980 1990 2000; 2010

Orason first appeared as a census designated place in the 2010 U.S. census after the Chula Vista-Orason CDP was split into the Orason and Chula Vista CDPs.

=== 2020 census ===
Orason CDP, Texas – Racial and ethnic composition Note: the US Census treats Hispanic/Latino as an ethnic category. This table excludes Latinos from the racial categories and assigns them to a separate category. Hispanics/Latinos may be of any race.
Race / Ethnicity (NH = Non-Hispanic)	Pop 2010	Pop 2020	% 2010	% 2020
White alone (NH)	7	15	5.43%	17.05%
Black or African American alone (NH)	1	1	0.78%	1.14%
Native American or Alaska Native alone (NH)	0	0	0.00%	0.00%
Asian alone (NH)	0	0	0.00%	0.00%
Native Hawaiian or Pacific Islander alone (NH)	1	0	0.78%	0.00%
Other race alone (NH)	0	0	0.00%	0.00%
Mixed race or Multiracial (NH)	1	2	0.78%	2.27%
Hispanic or Latino (any race)	119	70	92.25%	79.55%
Total	129	88	100.00%	100.00%
