= Cottonwood, Somervell County, Texas =

Cottonwood, Texas
- Unincorporated community
- Location within Texas Location within the United States
- Coordinates: 32°11′28″N 97°53′21″W
- Country: United States
- State: Texas
- County: Somervell
- Elevation: 1,037 ft (316 m)
- Time zone: UTC-6 (Central (CST))
  - Summer (DST): UTC-5 (CDT)
- ZIP code: 76043
- Area code: 254
- GNIS feature ID: 1333435

Cottonwood is an unincorporated community in western Somervell County, Texas. It is located off of Farm to Market Road 51 and is about nine miles southwest of Glen Rose.

== History ==
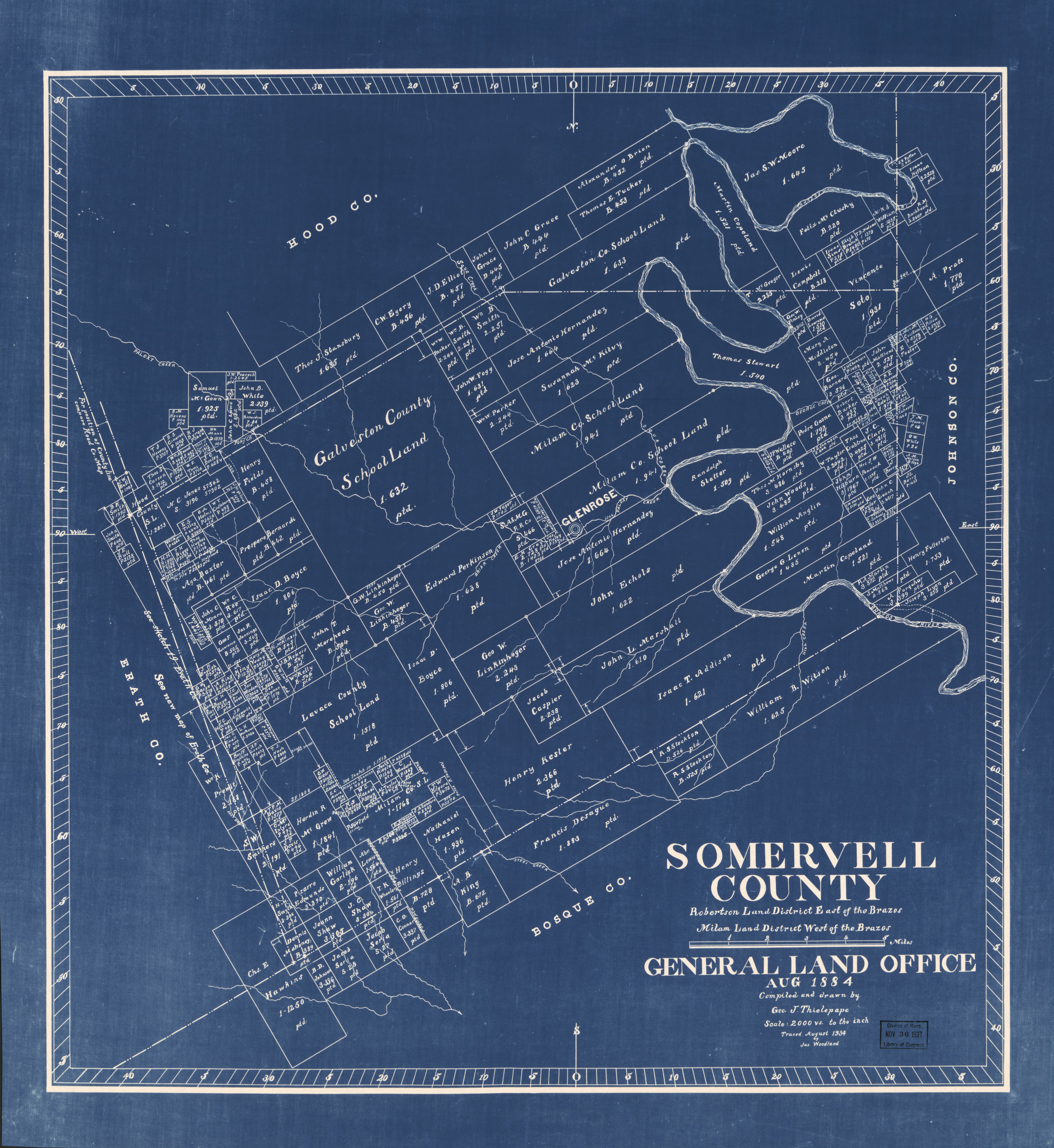
Land ownership map of Somervell County. Land owned by Dan Shipman, one of the founders of the church, is located on the western side

The community was built around the Friendship Missionary Baptist Church of Christ, later renamed the Cottonwood Baptist Church. Following an open meeting in August 1874, residents from the area decided to build a log cabin that would serve as a church. The church was organized in 1875 by six settlers from the county- Daniel, Eliza, and Sarah Shipman, Solomon and Sally Sutton, and B.M. McFaddin. In its first year, the church had an attendance of eight, Ten years later, in 1880, that number grew to sixty.

A school served the community by the early 1900s and continued through the 1930s. It was integrated into the Glen Rose Independent School District in the mid-1940s. The community had a population of twenty-four from 1970 to the mid-2000s. The church is still in operation.
