= Myrtle Springs, Texas =

- CDP
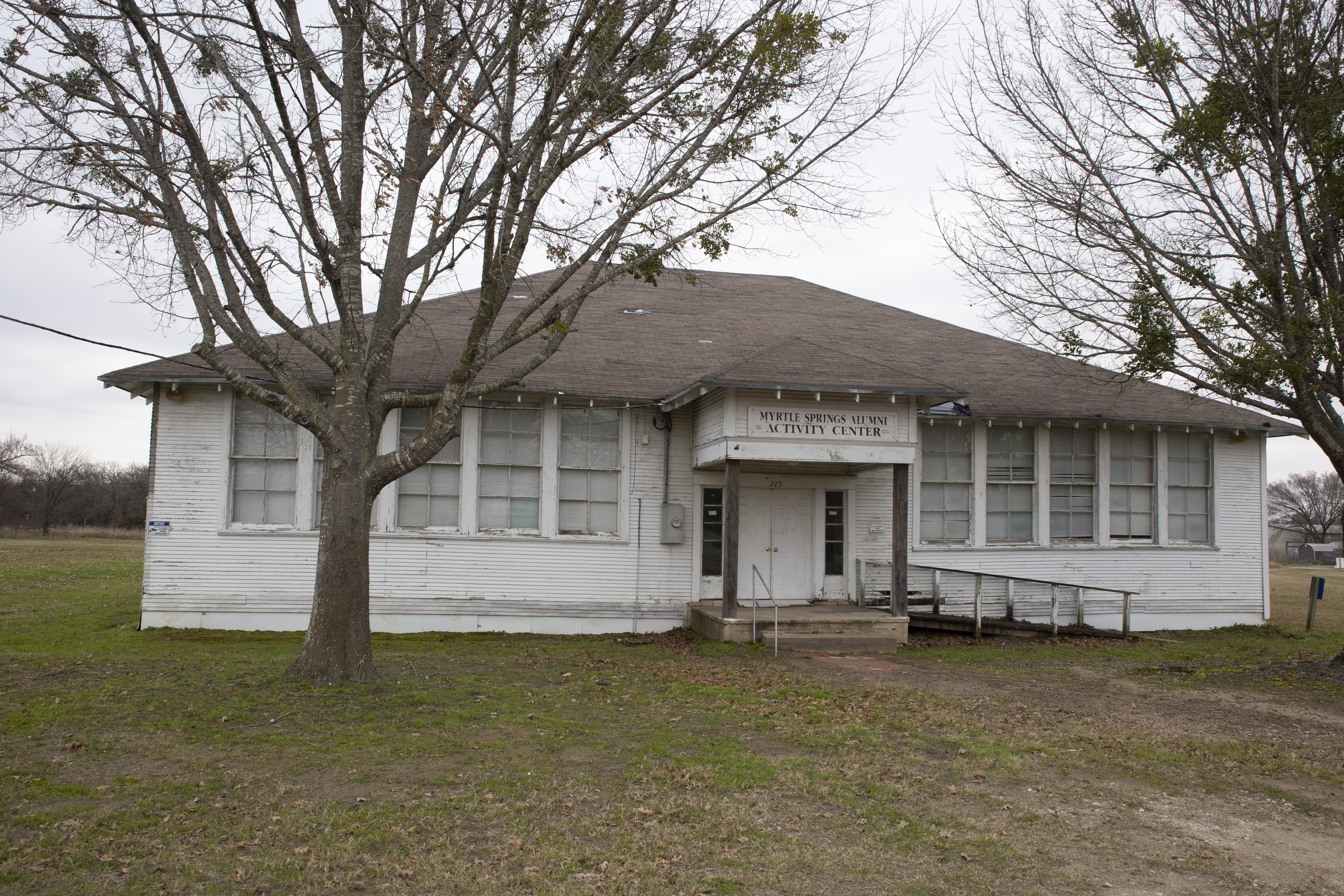
- Old Myrtle Springs School
- Interactive map of Myrtle Springs, Texas
- Coordinates: 32°37′24″N 95°55′48″W
- Country: United States
- State: Texas
- County: Van Zandt

Area
  - Total: 7.4 sq mi (19.2 km^{2})
  - Land: 7.3 sq mi (18.9 km^{2})
  - Water: 0.12 sq mi (0.3 km^{2})
- Elevation: 522 ft (159 m)

Population (2010)
  - Total: 828
  - Density: 113/sq mi (43.8/km^{2})
- Time zone: UTC-6 (Central (CST))
  - Summer (DST): UTC-5 (CDT)
- Zip Code: 75169
- GNIS feature ID: 2586962

Myrtle Springs is a census-designated place (CDP) in Van Zandt County, Texas, United States. It was a new CDP for the 2010 census. As of the 2020 census, Myrtle Springs had a population of 954.

== Geography ==
Myrtle Springs has a total area of 7.4 square miles (19 km^{2}), of which 7.3 square miles (19 km^{2}) are land and 0.1 square miles (0.26 km^{2}) are water.

== Demographics ==
Historical population
Census	Pop.	Note	%±
2010	828		—
2020	954		15.2%
U.S. Decennial Census; 1850–1900 1910; 1920 1930 1940; 1950 1960 1970; 1980 1990 2000; 2010 2020

Myrtle Springs first appeared as a census designated place in the 2010 U.S. census.

=== 2020 census ===
Myrtle Springs CDP, Texas – Racial and ethnic composition Note: the US Census treats Hispanic/Latino as an ethnic category. This table excludes Latinos from the racial categories and assigns them to a separate category. Hispanics/Latinos may be of any race.
Race / Ethnicity (NH = Non-Hispanic)	Pop 2010	Pop 2020	% 2010	% 2020
White alone (NH)	725	811	87.56%	85.01%
Black or African American alone (NH)	13	5	1.57%	0.52%
Native American or Alaska Native alone (NH)	7	5	0.85%	0.52%
Asian alone (NH)	3	3	0.36%	0.31%
Native Hawaiian or Pacific Islander alone (NH)	4	0	0.48%	0.00%
Other race alone (NH)	1	2	0.12%	0.21%
Mixed race or Multiracial (NH)	12	34	1.45%	3.56%
Hispanic or Latino (any race)	63	94	7.61%	9.85%
Total	828	954	100.00%	100.00%
