= Blue, Texas =

Blue
- Unincorporated community
- Interactive map of Blue
- Location within Texas Blue (the United States)
- Coordinates: 30°23′31″N 97°8′51″W
- Country: United States
- State: Texas
- County: Lee County

Blue is an unincorporated community located along Farm Road 696 in northwestern Lee County, Texas, United States.

== History ==
The area of the community was settled in 1846 by brothers Joseph, William, and Isaac Jackson, who were Mexican War veterans that received a one-third league grant for their service. They established the community under the name Blue Branch after a nearby creek with the same name. In 1879, a communal post office was granted with Lewis L. Williams as the postmaster, and a Methodist church was established. The post office was closed temporarily in 1895 and was then reopened in 1897, the same time the name of the settlement was abbreviated to Blue. Due to the lack of railroads and an isolated location, the community came to a decline starting from 1910. The post office was closed in 1913, and the school was consolidated into the Lexington Independent School district in 1941. In 1945, it had a population of 25, and only a few amenities such as a church and a business remained in the 1980s and was described as a dispersed rural community. The population increased to 50 in 2000.

In 2024, the Sandow Lakes Energy Co., as a part of the Texas Gas Rush, proposed building a 1,200-megawatt methane power plant in the area of Blue.

== Geography ==
Blue Branch is located 5miles (8.047 km) northeast of McDade in northwestern Lee County (at 30°21' N, 97°10' W), 5½ miles (8.851 km) away from northeastern part of Middle Yegua Creek, 2miles (3.219 km) from Blue (at 30°25' N, 97°10' W).
