= Hogeye, Texas =

Unincorporated community in Texas, US

Coordinates: 33°17′49″N 96°09′48″W

Hogeye is an unincorporated community in Hunt County, in the U.S. state of Texas.

== History ==
The first settlement at Hogeye was made in the 1850s. According to tradition, the community's name stems from a fancied resemblance of the Eye of Providence on a local Masonic hall to a hog's eye.
