= Thompsonville, Jim Hogg County, Texas =

- Census-designated place
- Location within Texas Location within the United States
- Coordinates: 27°15′17″N 98°47′2″W
- Country: United States
- State: Texas
- County: Jim Hogg

Area
  - Total: 3.9 sq mi (10.1 km^{2})
  - Land: 3.9 sq mi (10.1 km^{2})
  - Water: 0 sq mi (0.0 km^{2})
- Elevation: 669 ft (204 m)

Population (2020)
  - Total: 26
  - Density: 12/sq mi (4.6/km^{2})
- Time zone: UTC-6 (Central (CST))
  - Summer (DST): UTC-5 (CDT)
- FIPS code: 48-72758
- GNIS feature ID: 2584746

Thompsonville is a census-designated place (CDP) and unincorporated community in Jim Hogg County, Texas, United States. The population of the CDP was 46 at the 2010 census. The CDP is located along Farm to Market Road 3073 in northwestern Jim Hogg County, 9 miles (14 km) southwest of Hebbronville, the county seat.

== Etymology ==
The CDP takes its name from an unincorporated community near the western border of Jim Hogg County, at the junction of Farm Roads 649 and 3073, 9 miles (14 km) west of the Thompsonville CDP and 18 miles (29 km) southwest of Hebbronville. According to the Handbook of Texas, the community was probably named after Jim Hogg County's first sheriff, Oscar Thompson.

== History ==
Thompsonville's history dates back to the 1910s. The first commercial oil well in the county began producing oil on April 17, 1921. The well was located in the Mirando Valley field near Thompsonville and brought new residents to the area. A post office in 1925, but was discontinued around 1936. A school and several businesses were located at the site in the late 1940s. Today, Thompsonville is a small, dispersed community with a population less than 50.

== Demographics ==
Historical population
Census	Pop.	Note	%±
2010	46		—
2020	26		−43.5%
U.S. Decennial Census; 1850–1900 1910; 1920 1930 1940; 1950 1960 1970; 1980 1990 2000; 2010 2020

Thompsonville was first listed as a census designated place in the 2010 U.S. census.

Thompsonville CDP, Texas – Racial and ethnic composition Note: the US Census treats Hispanic/Latino as an ethnic category. This table excludes Latinos from the racial categories and assigns them to a separate category. Hispanics/Latinos may be of any race.
Race / Ethnicity (NH = Non-Hispanic)	Pop 2010	Pop 2020	% 2010	% 2020
White alone (NH)	13	6	28.26%	23.08%
Black or African American alone (NH)	0	0	0.00%	0.00%
Native American or Alaska Native alone (NH)	0	1	0.00%	3.85%
Asian alone (NH)	0	0	0.00%	0.00%
Native Hawaiian or Pacific Islander alone (NH)	0	0	0.00%	0.00%
Other race alone (NH)	0	0	0.00%	0.00%
Mixed race or Multiracial (NH)	0	0	0.00%	0.00%
Hispanic or Latino (any race)	33	19	71.74%	73.08%
Total	46	26	0.00%	0.00%
