= Thompsonville, Gonzales County, Texas =

Unincorporated community in Texas, US

Coordinates: 29°42′10″N 97°22′55″W

Thompsonville is an unincorporated community in Gonzales County, Texas, United States. The elevation is 427 feet.
