= U.S. Route 79 in Texas =

Segment of American highway

U.S. Highway 79
- US 79 highlighted in red

Route information
- Maintained by TxDOT
- Length: 271.788 mi (437.400 km)
- Existed: 1935–present

Major junctions
- South end: I-35 in Round Rock
- SH 130 Toll in Hutto; US 77 in Rockdale; US 190 from Milano to Hearne; SH 6 in Hearne; I-45 in Buffalo; US 84 from Oakwood to Palestine; US 287 in Palestine; US 69 in Jacksonville; US 259 in Henderson; Future I-369 / US 59 in Carthage
- North end: US 79 at Louisiana state line near Panola

Location
- Country: United States
- State: Texas
- Counties: Williamson, Milam, Robertson, Leon, Freestone, Anderson, Cherokee, Rusk, Panola

Highway system
- United States Numbered Highway System; List; Special; Divided; Highways in Texas; Interstate; US; State; Former; Toll; Loops; Spurs; FM/RM; Park; Rec
← SH 78	→ SH 79

U.S. Route 79 (US 79) is a U.S. highway that begins in the state of Texas at Interstate 35 in Round Rock. The highway travels northeast–southwest through the state, crossing into Louisiana approximately 23 miles northeast of Carthage. US 79 is entwined with two tragedies of country music: Johnny Horton was killed by a drunk driver on the highway near Milano in 1960 and Jim Reeves, killed in a plane crash in 1964, is buried and memorialized on US 79 in his hometown of Carthage.

== Route description ==
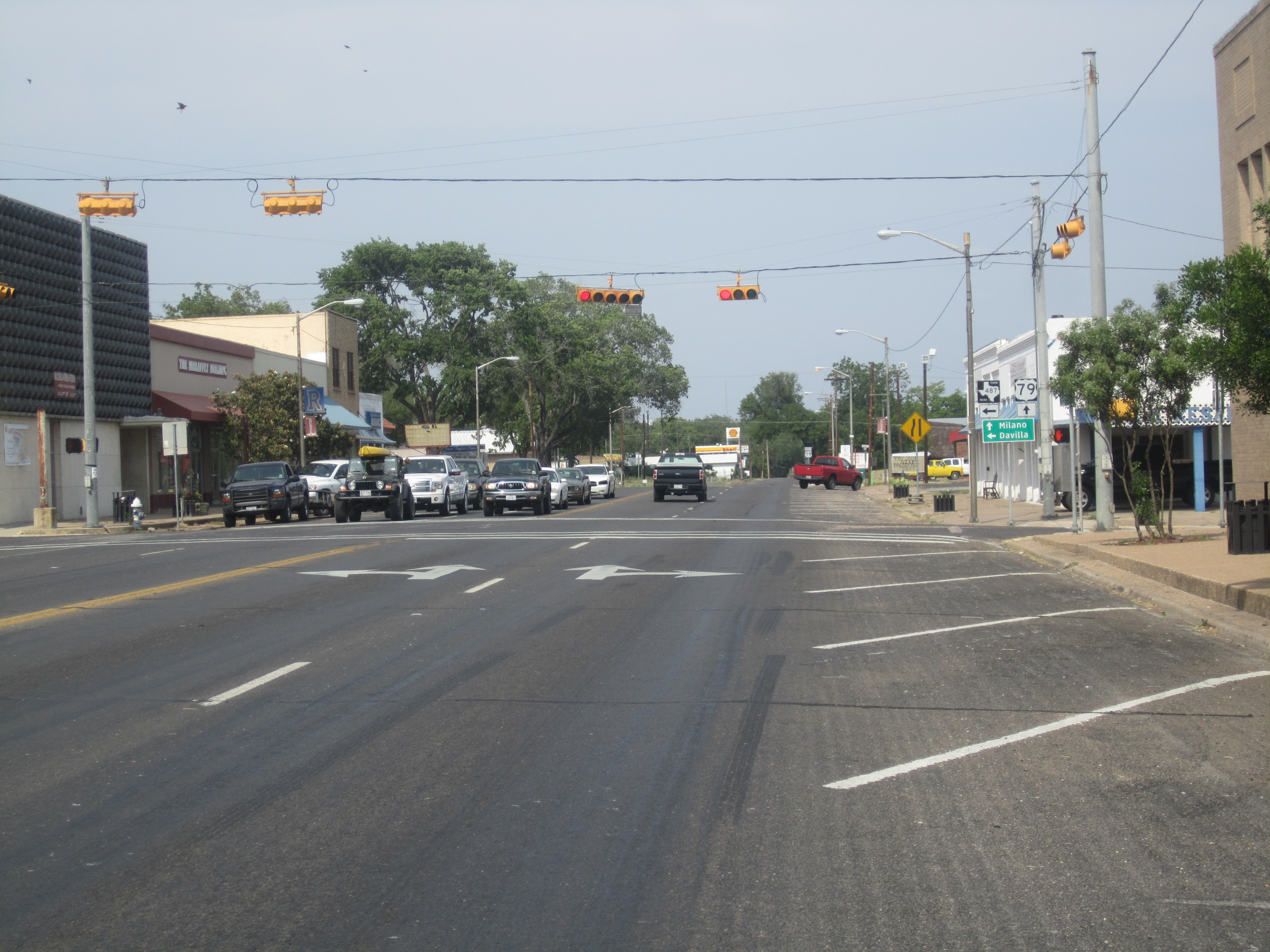
U.S. 79 is the main street of Rockdale in Milam County, Texas.

US 79 begins at an interchange with Interstate 35 in the northern Austin suburb of Round Rock. The highway travels through the town as Palm Valley Boulevard, entering into the town of Hutto just before an interchange with State Highway 130. Leaving Hutto, US 79 takes a more rural route, bypassing the town of Taylor on Carlos G. Parker Boulevard, and enters Milam County right before entering the small community of Thorndale. US 79 runs through the town of Rockdale before entering Milano, where it begins an overlap with U.S. Route 190 and a brief concurrency with State Highway 36. The overlap with US 190 ends in Hearne, where an overlap with State Highway 6 begins. US 79 leaves State Highway 6, resuming its northeast–southwest run. The highway runs through several smaller towns, including Franklin and Buffalo, intersecting Interstate 45 in the latter town, and begins an overlap with US 84 approximately 9 miles southwest of Palestine. Running through the city, the highway intersects US Route 287 and shares a brief overlap with State Highway 19. Leaving Palestine, US 79 travels through a heavily forested area of east Texas serving the towns of Jacksonville and Henderson. Leaving Henderson, the highway runs in an east–west direction before arriving at Carthage, turning back into a more northeast–southwest direction. About 23 miles northeast of Carthage US 79 leaves Texas and enters into Louisiana just northeast of Panola, running towards Shreveport.

== Junction list ==
County	Location	mi	km	Destinations	Notes
Williamson	Round Rock	0.0	0.0	I-35 / Sam Bass Road – Georgetown, Austin	I-35 exit 253; continuation past I-35 via Sam Bass Road
Williamson	Round Rock	0.4	0.64	Spur 376 north (North Mays Street)	
Williamson	Round Rock	2.0	3.2	FM 1460 north (A. W. Grimes Boulevard)	Access to Ascension Seton Williamson Hospital
Williamson	Hutto	6.6	10.6	SH 130 Toll – Waco, San Antonio	Interchange; SH 130 exit 423
Williamson	Hutto	7.8	12.6	FM 685 south (Chris Kelly Boulevard) / Ed Schmidt Boulevard – Pflugerville	
Williamson	Hutto	8.8	14.2	FM 1660 north – Jonah	South end of FM 1660 overlap
Williamson	Hutto	9.1	14.6	FM 1660 south – Norman's Crossing, Coupland	North end of FM 1660 overlap
Williamson		12.6	20.3	FM 3349 south – Norman's Crossing	
Williamson	Taylor	15.5	24.9	Bus. US 79 north / FM 397 north – Downtown Taylor, Granger	Interchange
Williamson	Taylor	16.7	26.9	FM 973 south – Manor	
Williamson	Taylor	17.7	28.5	SH 95 – Elgin	Interchange
Williamson	Taylor	19.3	31.1	FM 112 (Martin Luther King Jr. Boulevard)	
Williamson	Taylor	20.0	32.2	Bus. US 79 south (4th Street) – Taylor	Interchange
Williamson	Taylor	20.5	33.0	FM 619	
Williamson		26.1	42.0	FM 1063 north	
Milam	Thorndale			FM 486 – San Gabriel, Buckholts	
Milam				FM 1768 south	
Milam	Rockdale			FM 487 south to FM 2116 – Lexington	South end of FM 487 overlap
Milam	Rockdale			FM 908 – Caldwell, San Gabriel	
Milam	Rockdale			FM 487 north – Bartlett, Jarrell, Florence	North end of FM 487 overlap
Milam	Rockdale			US 77 – Cameron, Waco, Lexington, Giddings	Interchange
Milam	Milano			US 190 west / SH 36 north – Cameron, Temple, Waco	South end of US 190/SH 36 overlap
Milam	Milano			FM 3242 north – Hanover	
Milam	Milano			SH 36 south – Caldwell, Brenham	North end of SH 36 overlap
Milam	Gause			FM 2095 west – Cameron	
Robertson				FM 1644 east – Calvert	
Robertson	Hearne			FM 50 south – Mumford, Brenham	
Robertson	Hearne			US 190 east / SH 6 south / FM 391 east – Bryan, College Station, Wheelock	Interchange; northbound exit and southbound entrance; north end of US 190 overlap; south end of SH 6 overlap
Robertson	Hearne			FM 485 west – Branchville, Temple	
Robertson				SH 6 north – Marlin, Waco, Mexia, Dallas	Interchange; north end of SH 6 overlap
Robertson	Elliott			FM 2549 south	
Robertson	Franklin			FM 1644 west – Calvert	
Robertson	Franklin			FM 46 – Bremond, Wheelock	
Robertson	Franklin			FM 2446 east	
Robertson	New Baden			FM 1940 south	
Robertson	Easterly			FM 2098 north – Bald Prairie	
Leon				FM 3 south – Hilltop Lakes, Normangee	
Leon	Marquez			Loop 208 north – Centerville, Crockett	
Leon	Marquez			SH 7 – Kosse, Centerville	
Leon	Marquez			FM 1146 north	
Leon				FM 1512 north – Lake Limestone	
Leon	Jewett			FM 39 – Mexia, Flynn	Interchange
Leon	Buffalo			I-45 – Dallas, Houston	I-45 exit 178
Leon	Buffalo			SH 75 – Fairfield, Centerville	Former US 75
Leon	Buffalo			SH 164 west – Groesbeck, Waco	
Leon	Buffalo			FM 1848 north	
Leon				FM 832 south – Keechi	
Leon	Oakwood			FM 542 south to FM 831 – Malvern, Flo	
Freestone				US 84 west – Fairfield, Teague	Interchange; no northbound exit; south end of US 84 overlap
Anderson				SH 294 east – Elkhart, Alto	
Anderson	Tucker			FM 645 north – Tennessee Colony	
Anderson	Palestine			FM 1990 south (Knox Street)	
Anderson	Palestine			Loop 256 – Corsicana, Athens, Crockett	
Anderson	Palestine			FM 2394 west (Court Drive)	
Anderson	Palestine			US 287 / US 84 east / SH 19 north – Corsicana, Athens, Crockett, Rusk	North end of US 84 overlap; south end of SH 19 overlap
Anderson	Palestine			SH 155 north – Frankston, Tyler	
Anderson	Palestine			SH 19 south – Elkhart, Crockett	North end of SH 19 overlap
Anderson	Palestine			Loop 256 – Tyler, Rusk	
Anderson	Neches			FM 2574 east to FM 19 north / FM 321 west / FM 2267 north / FM 3372 north – Frankston, Montalba, Pert	
Anderson	Neches			FM 2574 west to FM 19 north / FM 321 west / FM 2267 north – Frankston, Montalba, Pert	
Cherokee				FM 921 north	
Cherokee				FM 747 west	
Cherokee				FM 747 south	
Cherokee	Jacksonville			FM 347 south to FM 2138 south – Maydelle, Dialville	
Cherokee	Jacksonville			US 69 – Tyler, Rusk, Lufkin	
Cherokee	Jacksonville			SH 204 east to Loop 456 west – Reklaw, Nacogdoches, Rusk	
Cherokee	New Summerfield			SH 110 to FM 235 – Tyler, Troup, Rusk, Ponta	
Cherokee				FM 856 north	
Cherokee				FM 2274 north	
Cherokee				FM 2274 south – Ponta	
Rusk				SH 42 north / FM 1798 east – Kilgore, Laneville, Minden	
Rusk				FM 839 south – Reklaw	
Rusk	Henderson			Loop 571 north – Tyler, Overton, Kilgore	
Rusk	Henderson			FM 225 south – Cushing	
Rusk	Henderson			FM 3310 south – Mount Enterprise	
Rusk	Henderson			US 259 south – Mount Enterprise, Nacogdoches	South end of US 259 overlap
Rusk	Henderson			FM 840 to FM 13 – Troup	
Rusk	Henderson			US 259 north / SH 64 west / SH 43 north – Kilgore, Tyler, Tatum, Marshall	North end of US 259 overlap
Rusk	Henderson			FM 3135 east – Church Hill	
Rusk				FM 348 south – Pine Hill	
Rusk				FM 1798 west / FM 3231 north – Pine Hill, Minden, Tatum	at the Rusk/Panola County Line
Panola				FM 124 east / FM 1251 west – Beckville, Church Hill	
Panola				FM 1970 south – Clayton, Timpson	
Panola				FM 959 north – Beckville	
Panola	Carthage			Bus. US 79 north / Loop 436 south – Mount Enterprise, Tenaha	Interchange; south end of Loop 436 overlap
Panola	Carthage			SH 149 west / Spur 572 east – Tatum, Longview	Interchange
Panola	Carthage			Future I-369 north / US 59 north / Bus. US 59 south – Marshall, Texarkana	Interchange; north end of future I-369/US 59 overlap
Panola	Carthage			Future I-369 south / US 59 south / Bus. US 79 south / Loop 436 south – Nacogdoches, Lufkin, Houston, Beaumont	Interchange; north end of future I-369/US 59/Loop 436 overlap
Panola				FM 123 east	
Panola				FM 1186 north	
Panola	DeBerry			FM 31 to FM 1794 – Elysian Fields, Grand Bluff, Marshall, Logansport	
Panola	Panola			FM 9 north – Waskom	
Panola				US 79 north – Greenwood, Shreveport	Continuation into Louisiana
1.000 mi = 1.609 km; 1.000 km = 0.621 mi: Concurrency terminus; Electronic toll collection
