= Neches =

Neches may refer to:

- Neches River, a river in Texas
- Neches, Texas, an unincorporated community in Anderson County, Texas
  - Neches High School, a public high school in Neches, Texas
