= Bryson Washington =

American football player

No. 30 – Auburn Tigers
- Position: Running back
- Class: Redshirt Sophomore

Personal information
- Born: Dallas, Texas, U.S.
- Listed height: 6 ft 0 in (1.83 m)
- Listed weight: 210 lb (95 kg)

Career information
- High school: Franklin (Franklin, Texas)
- College: Baylor (2023–2025); Auburn (2026–present)
- Stats at ESPN

Bryson Washington is an American college football running back for the Auburn Tigers. He previously played for the Baylor Bears.

== Early life ==
Washington was born in Dallas, Texas and moved to Franklin, Texas when he was in middle school. Washington attended Franklin High School where as a senior, he rushed for over 2,000 yards and 30 touchdowns as he finished as a semifinalist for the Mr. Texas Football award. Coming out of high school, Washington was rated as a three-star recruit and held offers from schools such as Arkansas, Baylor, Boston College, Houston, Indiana, Iowa State, TCU, Texas Tech, and SMU. In December 2022, he committed to play college football for the SMU Mustangs. However a week later, Washington flipped his commitment to play for the Baylor Bears.

== College career ==
As a freshman at Baylor in 2023, Washington ran ten times for 45 yards and made a catch for a yard. In week 8 of the 2024 season, he notched 116 yards and two touchdowns in a win over Texas Tech, earning Big 12 Conference Newcomer of the Week honors. In week 10, Washington ran for 196 yards and four touchdowns on 26 carries in a win over TCU. For his performance, he was named the Earl Campbell Tyler Rose player of the week. In week 12, Washington rushed for 123 yards and three touchdowns, adding a receiving touchdown, in a win over West Virginia.

On January 4, 2026, Washington announced that he would enter the transfer portal.
