= Valley Junction =

Valley Junction may refer to:

- Valley Junction, Oregon, an unincorporated community in Polk County, Oregon
- Valley Junction, Texas, an unincorporated community in Robertson County, Texas
- Valley Junction, Wisconsin, an unincorporated community in Monroe County, Wisconsin
- West Des Moines, Iowa, a city known as "Valley Junction" from 1893–1938
