= Easterly, Texas =

Easterly
- Unincorporated community
- Location within Texas Location within the United States
- Coordinates: 31°06′20″N 96°23′03″W
- Country: United States
- State: Texas
- County: Robertson
- Elevation: 387 ft (118 m)
- Time zone: UTC-6 (Central (CST))
  - Summer (DST): UTC-5 (CDT)
- Area code: 979
- GNIS feature ID: 1356768

Easterly is an unincorporated community in Robertson County, Texas, United States. Easterly is located on U.S. Route 79, northeast of Franklin.

== History ==
Easterly was settled in the 1870s under the name Acorn. Its first residents were former residents of Lake Station who left the community because of its frequent fever epidemics. A post office opened in Acorn in 1881; Dan Easterly, Sr., was the first postmaster. This first post office closed in 1891. The community's name was changed to Easterly when the International-Great Northern Railroad opened a station there. A new post office opened in Easterly in 1894; the first postmaster of that post office was Dan J. Easterly. The community's population peaked at 700 in 1914. Easterly began to decline after World War I, and by 2000, the population had decreased to 61.
