= New Baden =

New Baden may refer to:

== Places ==
- New Baden, Illinois, United States
- New Baden, Texas, United States
