= Tidwell Prairie, Texas =

Tidwell Prairie
- Unincorporated community
- Location within Texas Location within the United States
- Coordinates: 31°05′24″N 96°39′27″W
- Country: United States
- State: Texas
- County: Robertson
- Elevation: 384 ft (117 m)
- Time zone: UTC-6 (Central (CST))
  - Summer (DST): UTC-5 (CDT)
- Area code: 979
- GNIS feature ID: 1380663

Tidwell Prairie is an unincorporated community in Robertson County, Texas, United States. Tidwell Prairie is eight miles northeast of Calvert. The community was founded after the Civil War by residents of Owensville; it was most likely named after Tidwell's Creek. Tidwell Prairie had two schools in 1942 and a church and a school in the 1970s and 1980s.
