= Elliott, Texas =

Elliott
- Unincorporated community
- Location within Texas Location within the United States
- Coordinates: 30°57′14″N 96°34′07″W
- Country: United States
- State: Texas
- County: Robertson
- Elevation: 371 ft (113 m)
- Time zone: UTC-6 (Central (CST))
  - Summer (DST): UTC-5 (CDT)
- GNIS feature ID: 1379713

Elliott is a small unincorporated community in Robertson County, Texas, United States, at the junction of U.S. Highway 79 and Farm to Market Road 2549, approximately 5 mi (8 km) southwest of Franklin.

== History ==
The community was established in 1871 as a station on the International–Great Northern Railroad, and named after the landowner, who donated his property for the townsite. The town's population fluctuated between 20 and 50. From 1895 to 1916, it had its own post office; prior to that, between 1890 and 1892, a post office named Una operated in the town.

In 1902, a gazetteer described Elliott as a post-village.
