= Valley Junction, Texas =

Unincorporated community in Texas, US

Valley Junction is a small unincorporated community in Robertson County, Texas, United States. It is located near what was formerly Robertson's Colony, the colony founded by Sterling C. Robertson when he moved from Nashville, Tennessee.

Its coordinates are 30°50′31″N 96°38′16″W at an elevation of 276 feet (84 meters). It lies in the Brazos River alluvium aquifer.

Nearby cities include:

- Goodland, Texas 3.3 mi. NW
- Hearne, Texas 3.7 mi. NE
- Bryan, Texas 24.7 mi. SE

== Railroad junction ==
A railroad junction was created by the Hearne and Brazos Valley Railway extending 16 miles connecting the International and Great Northern Railways in 1892. A flood of 1899 almost completely destroyed the railroad, but the tracks were rebuilt in another location. By 1930, the Valley Junction location became part of a 2,500-mile system build by the Missouri Pacific Railway which ran from Valley Junction North through Waco to Fort Worth.

== Present day ==
Currently, Valley Junction is a small agricultural community. Valley Junction is served by Hearne Independent School District.
