= Franklin High School (Franklin, Texas) =

Coordinates: 31.0223°N 96.5034°W

Location
- 1252 W FM 1644; Franklin, Texas 77856-0909; United States

Information
- School type: Public High School
- School district: Franklin Independent School District
- Principal: Keli Foley
- Staff: 33.81 (on an FTE basis)
- Grades: 9-12
- Enrollment: 490 (2024-25)
- Student to teacher ratio: 10.06
- Colors: Green & White
- Athletics conference: UIL Class 3A
- Mascot: Lion
- Website: Franklin High School

Franklin High School is a 3A public high school located in Franklin, Texas (USA). It is part of the Franklin Independent School District located in central Robertson County. In 2011, the school was rated "Academically Acceptable" by the Texas Education Agency.

== Athletics ==
The Franklin Lions compete in the following sports:

Football, Volleyball, Basketball, Cross Country, Powerlifting, Golf, Tennis, Track, Baseball, and Softball.

=== State titles ===
- Baseball
  - 2024(3A)
- Football
  - 2021(3A/D2)
  - 2022(3A/D1)

Franklin defeated north Texas football power Gunter in the 2021 UIL Conference 3A Division II Championship Game on the way to its first football state championship.

In 2022, Franklin won their 2nd consecutive state championship by defeating Brock in the UIL Division I Championship Game.

In 2025 and 2026, the Franklin Lion Marching Band advanced to the UIL 3A State Marching Band Contest.

== Fine arts ==
The Franklin High School has a variety of Fine Arts that range from:

Marching, Concert, Jazz Band, Art, Animation, and Theatre.

== Notable alumni ==
- Bryson Washington, college football running back for the Baylor Bears
