= Leon Independent School District =

School district in Texas, United States

Address
- 12168 Highway 79 West Jewett, Texas, 75846; United States

District information
- Type: Public
- Grades: PK–12
- Schools: 2
- NCES District ID: 4827180

Students and staff
- Students: 751 (2023–2024)
- Teachers: 56.29 (on an FTE basis) (2023–2024)
- Staff: 60.19 (on an FTE basis) (2023–2024)
- Student–teacher ratio: 13.34 (2023–2024)

Other information
- Website: www.leonisd.net

Leon Independent School District is a public school district based in Jewett, Texas, United States.

In addition to Jewett, the district serves the city of Marquez. A small portion of the district extends into northeastern Robertson County.

The district has three campuses – Leon High (grades 9-12), Leon Junior High (grades 7-8), and Leon Elementary (prekindergarten-grade 6). The school mascot is the cougar. In 2009, the school district was rated "academically acceptable" by the Texas Education Agency.
