= Robertson County, Texas =

County in Texas, United States

- County
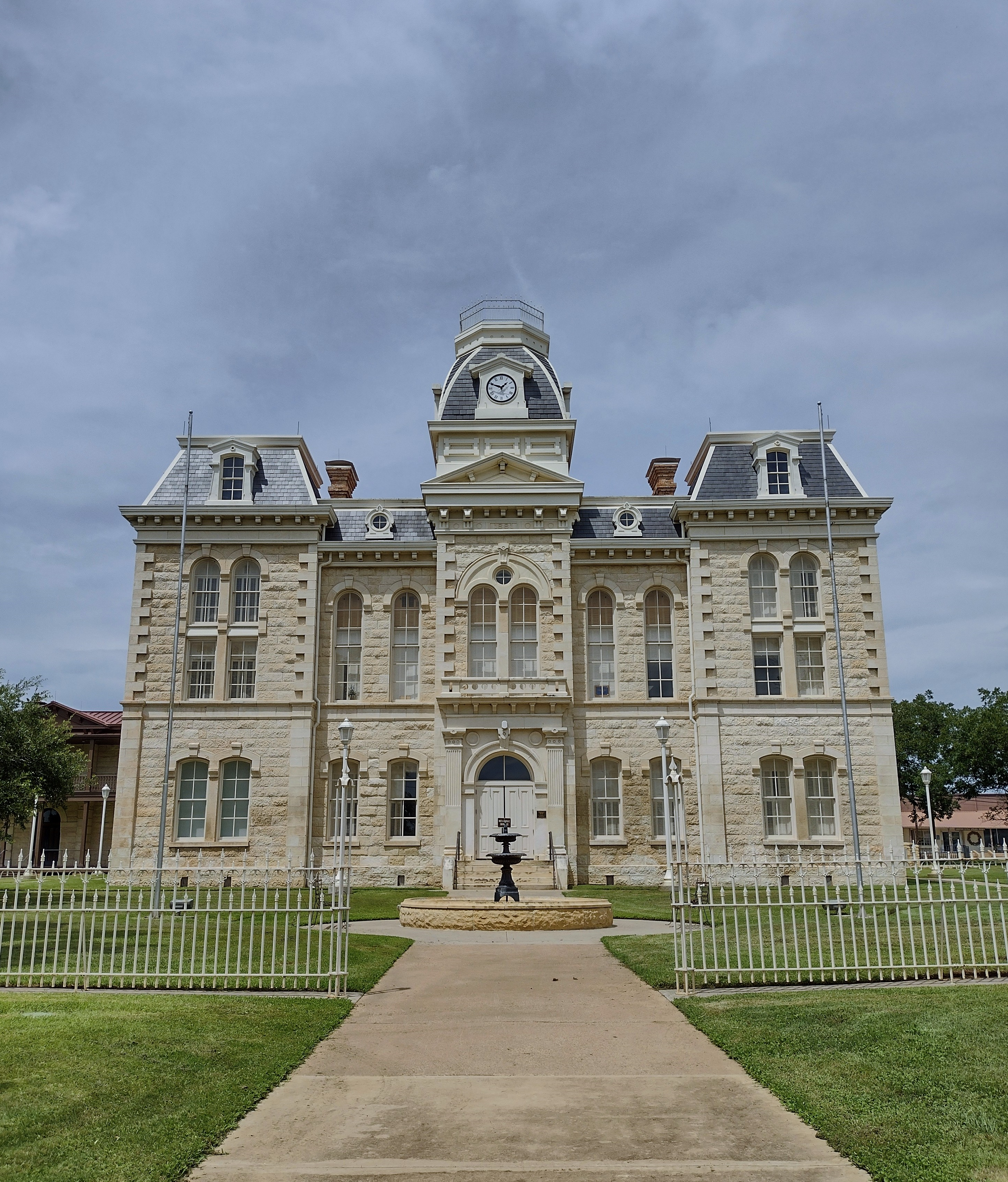
- The Robertson County Courthouse in Franklin

- Location within the U.S. state of Texas
- Coordinates: 31°02′N 96°31′W
- Country: United States
- State: Texas
- Founded: 1838
- Named for: Sterling C. Robertson
- Seat: Franklin
- Largest city: Hearne

Area
  - Total: 865 sq mi (2,240 km^{2})
  - Land: 856 sq mi (2,220 km^{2})
  - Water: 9.7 sq mi (25 km^{2}) 1.1%

Population (2020)
  - Total: 16,757
  - Estimate (2025): 17,839 ▲
  - Density: 19.6/sq mi (7.56/km^{2})
- Time zone: UTC−6 (Central)
  - Summer (DST): UTC−5 (CDT)
- Congressional district: 17th
- Website: www.co.robertson.tx.us

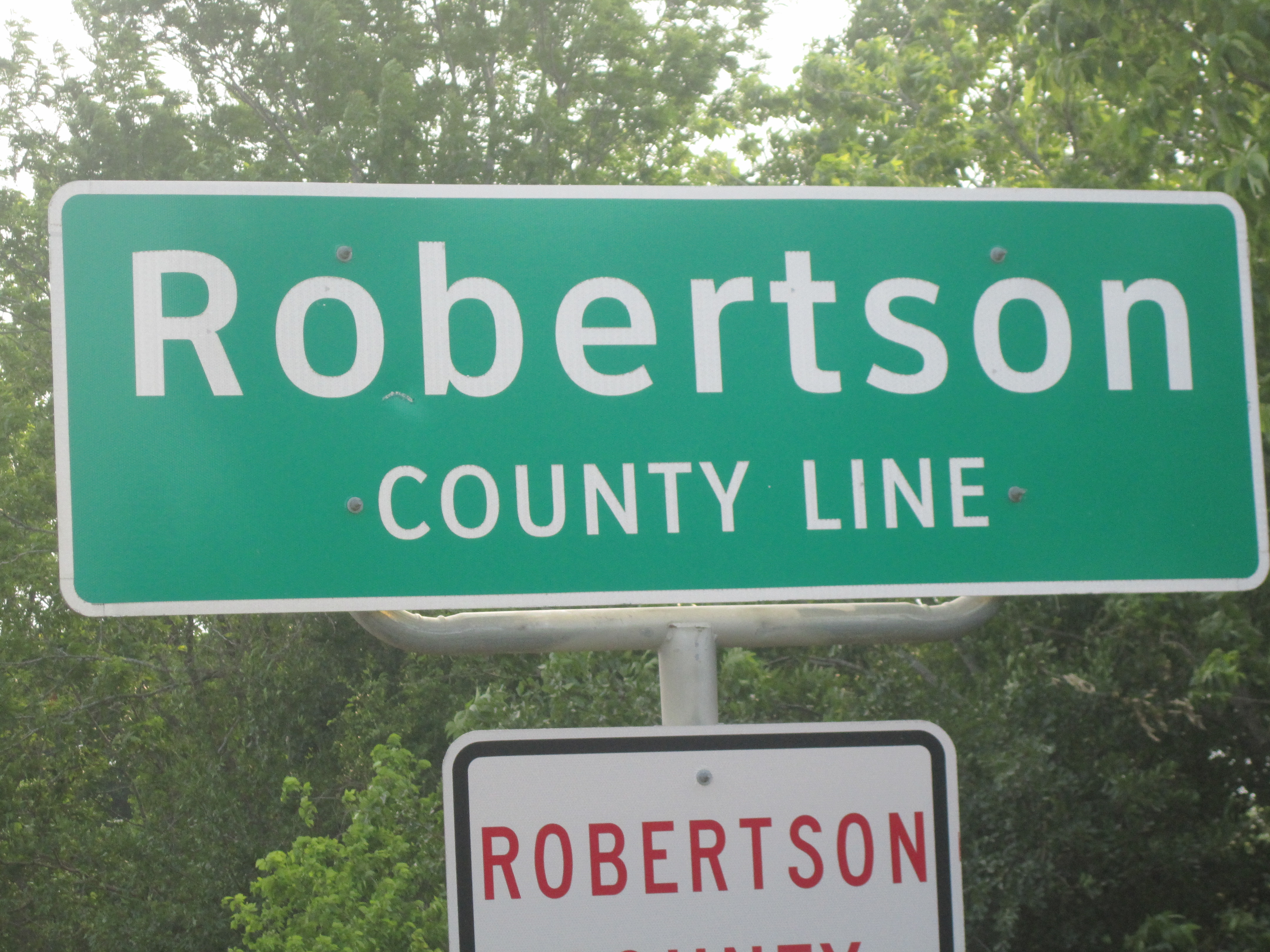

Robertson County is a county in the U.S. state of Texas. As of the 2020 census, its population was 16,757. Its county seat is Franklin. The county was created in 1837 and organized the following year. It is named for Sterling C. Robertson, an early settler who signed the Texas Declaration of Independence.

Robertson County is in east-central Texas and is part of the College Station-Bryan, TX metropolitan statistical area.

== Geography ==
According to the U.S. Census Bureau, the county has a total area of 865 sq mi (2,240 km^{2}), of which 856 square miles (2,220 km^{2}) are land and 9.7 sq mi (25 km^{2}) (1.1%) are covered by water.

=== Major highways ===
- U.S. Highway 79
- U.S. Highway 190
- State Highway 6
- State Highway 7
- State Highway 14
- State Highway OSR (which mostly forms Robertson County's southeastern border alongside Brazos County)
- Spur 231

=== Adjacent counties ===
- Limestone County (north)
- Leon County (northeast)
- Brazos County (southeast)
- Burleson County (south)
- Milam County (southwest)
- Falls County (northwest)

== Demographics ==
Historical population
Census	Pop.	Note	%±
1850	934		—
1860	4,997		435.0%
1870	9,990		99.9%
1880	22,383		124.1%
1890	26,506		18.4%
1900	31,480		18.8%
1910	27,454		−12.8%
1920	27,933		1.7%
1930	27,240		−2.5%
1940	25,710		−5.6%
1950	19,908		−22.6%
1960	16,157		−18.8%
1970	14,389		−10.9%
1980	14,653		1.8%
1990	15,511		5.9%
2000	16,000		3.2%
2010	16,622		3.9%
2020	16,757		0.8%
2025 (est.)	17,839	▲	6.5%
U.S. Decennial Census; 1850–2010 2010 2020

=== Racial and ethnic composition ===
Robertson County, Texas – Racial and ethnic composition Note: the US Census treats Hispanic/Latino as an ethnic category. This table excludes Latinos from the racial categories and assigns them to a separate category. Hispanics/Latinos may be of any race.
Race / Ethnicity (NH = Non-Hispanic)	Pop 1980	Pop 1990	Pop 2000	Pop 2010	Pop 2020	% 1980	% 1990	% 2000	% 2010	% 2020
White alone (NH)	8,617	9,373	9,580	9,821	9,505	58.81%	60.43%	59.88%	59.08%	56.72%
Black or African American alone (NH)	4,626	4,197	3,830	3,509	3,095	31.57%	27.06%	23.94%	21.11%	18.47%
Native American or Alaska Native alone (NH)	12	19	43	47	29	0.08%	0.12%	0.27%	0.28%	0.17%
Asian alone (NH)	13	12	26	96	104	0.09%	0.08%	0.16%	0.58%	0.62%
Native Hawaiian or Pacific Islander alone (NH)	x	x	4	0	21	x	x	0.03%	0.00%	0.13%
Other race alone (NH)	13	6	8	9	37	0.09%	0.04%	0.05%	0.05%	0.22%
Mixed race or Multiracial (NH)	x	x	150	150	438	x	x	0.94%	0.90%	2.61%
Hispanic or Latino (any race)	1,372	1,904	2,359	2,990	3,528	9.36%	12.28%	14.74%	17.99%	21.05%
Total	14,653	15,511	16,000	16,622	16,757	100.00%	100.00%	100.00%	100.00%	100.00%

=== 2020 census ===
As of the 2020 census, the county had a population of 16,757. The median age was 42.7 years, 24.1% of residents were under the age of 18, and 21.0% of residents were 65 years of age or older. For every 100 females there were 98.9 males, and for every 100 females age 18 and over there were 95.7 males age 18 and over.

The racial makeup of the county was 62.7% White, 19.0% Black or African American, 0.6% American Indian and Alaska Native, 0.6% Asian, 0.1% Native Hawaiian and Pacific Islander, 9.4% from some other race, and 7.6% from two or more races. Hispanic or Latino residents of any race comprised 21.1% of the population.

There were 6,540 households in the county, of which 31.6% had children under the age of 18 living in them. Of all households, 49.1% were married-couple households, 19.1% were households with a male householder and no spouse or partner present, and 27.6% were households with a female householder and no spouse or partner present. About 27.0% of all households were made up of individuals and 13.5% had someone living alone who was 65 years of age or older. There were 8,422 housing units, of which 22.3% were vacant. Among occupied housing units, 73.2% were owner-occupied and 26.8% were renter-occupied. The homeowner vacancy rate was 1.6% and the rental vacancy rate was 11.6%.

Less than 0.1% of residents lived in urban areas, while 100.0% lived in rural areas.

=== 2000 census ===
As of the 2000 census, 16,000 people, 6,179 households, and 4,356 families were residing in the county. The population density was 19 people/mi^{2} (7.3 people/km^{2}). The 7,874 housing units averaged 9 units per square mile (3.5 units/km^{2}). The racial makeup of the county was 66.20% White, 24.19% African American, 0.42% Native American, 0.16% Asian, 7.22% from other races, and 1.79% from two or more races. About 14.74% of the population were Hispanics or Latinos of any race.

Of the 6,179 households, 32.00% had children under 18 living with them, 51.10% were married couples living together, 15.50% had a female householder with no husband present, and 29.50% were not families. About 26.90% of all households were made up of individuals, and 14.50% had someone living alone who was 65 or older. The average household size was 2.55, and the average family size was 3.09.

In the county, the age distribution was 28.20% under 18, 7.50% from 18 to 24, 24.20% from 25 to 44, 23.10% from 45 to 64, and 17.00% who were 65 or older. The median age was 38 years. For every 100 females, there were 91.00 males. For every 100 females age 18 and over, there were 87.70 males.

The median income for a household in the county was $28,886, and for a family was $35,590. Males had a median income of $30,795 versus $21,529 for females. The per capita income for the county was $14,714. About 17.30% of families and 20.60% of the population were below the poverty line, including 28.70% of those under age 18 and 21.60% of those age 65 or over.

== Communities ==
=== Cities ===
- Bremond
- Calvert
- Franklin (county seat)
- Hearne

=== Unincorporated communities ===
- Bald Prairie
- Benchley (partly in Brazos County)
- Easterly
- Elliott
- Hammond
- Mumford
- New Baden
- Ridge
- Tidwell Prairie
- Valley Junction
- Wheelock

=== Ghost towns ===
- Owensville

== Politics ==
Robertson County was a longtime Democratic stronghold, as were many rural Southern counties during the Jim Crow and immediate post-Jim Crow eras (It had only voted for a Republican in the national Republican landslide of 1972, and even then, only by a single vote). In 2000, the last time the county went to a Democrat (Al Gore), it was one of only three majority-white rural counties in Texas (with Newton and Morris) to vote for Bill Clinton's former vice president. None of the three have gone to a Democrat since.

United States presidential election results for Robertson County, Texas
Year	Republican		Democratic		Third party(ies)	
Year	No.	%	No.	%	No.	%
1912	153	11.57%	1,051	79.50%	118	8.93%
1916	218	13.82%	1,313	83.26%	46	2.92%
1920	225	8.95%	1,634	64.97%	656	26.08%
1924	226	10.00%	1,971	87.17%	64	2.83%
1928	751	33.54%	1,487	66.41%	1	0.04%
1932	148	5.82%	2,396	94.18%	0	0.00%
1936	86	3.16%	2,633	96.77%	2	0.07%
1940	175	5.20%	3,191	94.80%	0	0.00%
1944	126	4.14%	2,681	88.13%	235	7.73%
1948	246	8.49%	2,147	74.11%	504	17.40%
1952	1,378	34.39%	2,626	65.54%	3	0.07%
1956	1,285	36.63%	2,212	63.06%	11	0.31%
1960	935	25.86%	2,669	73.81%	12	0.33%
1964	895	21.07%	3,350	78.88%	2	0.05%
1968	965	20.35%	2,833	59.74%	944	19.91%
1972	1,977	50.01%	1,976	49.99%	0	0.00%
1976	1,244	24.90%	3,741	74.88%	11	0.22%
1980	1,661	31.28%	3,572	67.27%	77	1.45%
1984	2,663	44.27%	3,339	55.50%	14	0.23%
1988	2,184	37.45%	3,630	62.24%	18	0.31%
1992	1,707	30.46%	2,927	52.23%	970	17.31%
1996	1,944	37.57%	2,912	56.27%	319	6.16%
2000	3,007	47.21%	3,283	51.55%	79	1.24%
2004	3,792	55.81%	2,979	43.84%	24	0.35%
2008	3,980	59.31%	2,675	39.87%	55	0.82%
2012	4,419	60.64%	2,798	38.40%	70	0.96%
2016	4,668	66.35%	2,203	31.31%	164	2.33%
2020	5,646	69.62%	2,374	29.27%	90	1.11%
2024	6,177	75.72%	1,926	23.61%	55	0.67%

United States Senate election results for Robertson County, Texas1
Year	Republican		Democratic		Third party(ies)	
Year	No.	%	No.	%	No.	%
2024	5,982	73.62%	2,006	24.69%	137	1.69%

United States Senate election results for Robertson County, Texas2
Year	Republican		Democratic		Third party(ies)	
Year	No.	%	No.	%	No.	%
2020	5,590	69.97%	2,244	28.09%	155	1.94%

Texas Gubernatorial election results for Robertson County
Year	Republican		Democratic		Third party(ies)	
Year	No.	%	No.	%	No.	%
2022	4,643	77.16%	1,293	21.49%	81	1.35%

== Education ==
School districts:

- Bremond Independent School District
- Bryan Independent School District
- Calvert Independent School District
- Franklin Independent School District
- Groesbeck Independent School District
- Hearne Independent School District
- Leon Independent School District
- Mumford Independent School District

Blinn College is the designated community college for portions of the county in Bryan, Franklin, Hearne, and Mumford ISDs. Portions in Bremond ISD and Calvert ISD are zoned to the McLennan Community College District.

== See also ==
- National Register of Historic Places listings in Robertson County, Texas
- Recorded Texas Historic Landmarks in Robertson County
