= Hearne Municipal Airport =

- IATA: none; ICAO: KLHB; FAA LID: LHB

Summary
- Airport type: Public
- Owner: City of Hearne
- Serves: Hearne, Texas
- Elevation AMSL: 285 ft (87 m)
- Coordinates: 30°52′20″N 096°37′20″W

Map
- Location within Texas

Runways
Direction	Length		Surface
Direction	ft	m	Surface
18/36	4,001	1,220	Asphalt

Statistics (2007)
- Aircraft operations: 5,700
- Source: Federal Aviation Administration

Hearne Municipal Airport (ICAO: KLHB, FAA LID: LHB) is a city-owned, public-use airport located one nautical mile (1.85 km) southwest of the central business district of Hearne, a city in Robertson County, Texas, United States.

Although most U.S. airports use the same three-letter location identifier for the FAA and IATA, this airport is assigned LHB by the FAA but has no designation from the IATA.

== Facilities and aircraft ==
Hearne Municipal Airport covers an area of 395 acres (160 ha) at an elevation of 285 feet (87 m) above mean sea level. It has one runway designated 18/36 with an asphalt surface measuring 4,001 by 75 feet (1,220 x 23 m). For the 12-month period ending June 8, 2007, the airport had 5,700 general aviation aircraft operations, an average of 15 per day.

== See also ==
- List of airports in Texas
