= New Summerfield, Texas =

City in Cherokee County, Texas, United States

- City
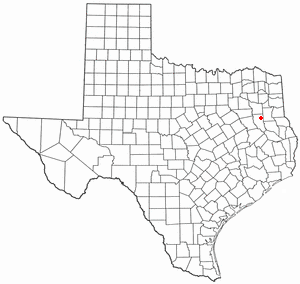
- Location of New Summerfield, Texas

- Coordinates: 31°58′51″N 95°07′39″W
- Country: United States
- State: Texas
- County: Cherokee

Government
  - Type: Mayor

Area
  - Total: 4.70 sq mi (12.17 km^{2})
  - Land: 4.70 sq mi (12.17 km^{2})
  - Water: 0 sq mi (0.00 km^{2})
- Elevation: 456 ft (139 m)

Population (2020)
  - Total: 843
  - Density: 248.9/sq mi (96.12/km^{2})
- Time zone: UTC-6 (Central (CST))
  - Summer (DST): UTC-5 (CDT)
- ZIP code: 75780
- Area codes: 903, 430
- FIPS code: 48-51336
- GNIS feature ID: 2411236
- Website: www.newsummerfield.us

New Summerfield is a city in Cherokee County, Texas, United States. The population was 843 at the 2020 U.S. census.

== Geography ==
New Summerfield is located in northeastern Cherokee County. U.S. Route 79 passes through the community, leading west 10 miles (16 km) to Jacksonville, the largest city in Cherokee County, and northeast 22 miles (35 km) to Henderson. Texas State Highway 110 intersects US 79 in the center of New Summerfield, leading north 11 miles (18 km) to Troup and south 14 miles (23 km) to Rusk, the Cherokee County seat. According to the United States Census Bureau, New Summerfield has a total area of 4.7 square miles (12.2 km^{2}), all land.

=== Climate ===
The climate in this area is characterized by hot, humid summers and generally mild to cool winters. According to the Köppen Climate Classification system, New Summerfield has a humid subtropical climate, abbreviated "Cfa" on climate maps.

== Demographics ==
Historical population
Census	Pop.	Note	%±
1970	344		—
1980	319		−7.3%
1990	521		63.3%
2000	998		91.6%
2010	1,111		11.3%
2020	843		−24.1%
U.S. Decennial Census

=== 2020 census ===
As of the 2020 census, New Summerfield had a population of 843, 243 households, and 178 families residing in the city. The median age was 29.8 years; 31.3% of residents were under the age of 18 and 11.6% of residents were 65 years of age or older. For every 100 females there were 105.1 males, and for every 100 females age 18 and over there were 110.5 males age 18 and over.

0.0% of residents lived in urban areas, while 100.0% lived in rural areas.

Of those households, 51.4% had children under the age of 18 living in them. Married couples made up 57.2% of households, 16.0% were households with a male householder and no spouse or partner present, and 20.2% were households with a female householder and no spouse or partner present. About 16.0% of all households were made up of individuals and 6.6% had someone living alone who was 65 years of age or older.

There were 274 housing units, of which 11.3% were vacant. The homeowner vacancy rate was 1.2% and the rental vacancy rate was 13.1%.

Racial composition as of the 2020 census
Race	Number	Percent
White	310	36.8%
Black or African American	9	1.1%
American Indian and Alaska Native	12	1.4%
Asian	0	0.0%
Native Hawaiian and Other Pacific Islander	0	0.0%
Some other race	308	36.5%
Two or more races	204	24.2%
Hispanic or Latino (of any race)	650	77.1%

== Education ==
New Summerfield is served by the New Summerfield Independent School District and home to the New Summerfield High School Hornets.

== Notable person ==
- Walt Dickson, former Major League Baseball pitcher for five seasons

== See also ==
- List of municipalities in Texas
