= Rod Monroe (American football) =

American football player (1976–2017)

Rodrick Monroe
No. 84, 89, 48
- Position: Tight end

Personal information
- Born: July 31, 1976; Hearne, Texas, U.S.
- Died: May 7, 2017 (aged 40); Houston, Texas, U.S.
- Listed height: 6 ft 5 in (1.96 m)
- Listed weight: 254 lb (115 kg)

Career information
- High school: Hearne (TX)
- College: Cincinnati
- NFL draft: 1998: 7th round, 237th overall pick

Career history
- Dallas Cowboys (1998)*; Atlanta Falcons (1998–1999); Jacksonville Jaguars (2000)*; Miami Dolphins (2000)*; Cleveland Browns (2000–2003); → Frankfurt Galaxy (2001)
- * Offseason or practice squad member only

Career NFL statistics
- Receptions: 1
- Receiving yards: 8
- Stats at Pro Football Reference

Rodrick Rochelle Monroe (July 31, 1976 – May 7, 2017) was an American professional football tight end in the National Football League (NFL) for the Atlanta Falcons and Cleveland Browns. He was selected by the Dallas Cowboys in the seventh round of the 1998 NFL draft after playing college football at the University of Cincinnati.

== Early life ==
Monroe attended Hearne High School in Hearne, Texas, where he was an All-district tight end. As a senior, he was a McDonald's All-American selection in basketball.

He first enrolled at McLennan Community College, where he was one of the top rebounders in junior college. He transferred to the University of Cincinnati after his sophomore season, where he played for the basketball team under coach Bob Huggins, along with future NBA players Danny Fortson and Ruben Patterson.

Monroe averaged 3.2 points and 2.9 rebounds per game in the 1995-96 season, backing up Fortson at small forward and helping the team win the Conference USA title and reach the NCAA Elite Eight. His best game was against the University of Arizona, collecting 11 points and 7 rebounds.

He averaged 4.6 points and 2.5 rebounds in the 1996-97 season, contributing to the team winning the Conference USA title and qualifying for the NCAA Tournament second round. He also was considered the strongest player on the team, bench-pressing 415 pounds and leg-pressing 1,130 pounds, both basketball school records at the time.

In 1997, he walked-on to the football team as a fifth year senior in August, after being out of football for 4 years. He became a regular starter at tight end when Josh Anderson suffered a torn ACL against the University of Houston on October 18. He was used mostly as a blocker, finishing with 4 starts, 2 receptions for 33 yards, one touchdown and 30 knockdown blocks.

== Professional career ==
Monroe was selected by the Dallas Cowboys in the seventh round (237th overall) of the 1998 NFL draft. He was waived on August 24. On September 1, 1998, he was signed by the Atlanta Falcons. Monroe was deactivated for Super Bowl XXXIII. He was released on August 19, 2000.

On August 22, 2000, he was signed by the Jacksonville Jaguars. Monroe was cut from the practice squad on September 6. The Miami Dolphins signed him to their practice squad on September 26, 2000. He was released on October 10.

On December 7, 2000, he was signed by the Cleveland Browns to their practice squad. In the 2001 offseason Monroe was allocated to the Frankfurt Galaxy of NFL Europe, where he caught 23 passes for 362 yards and 2 touchdowns. He was placed on the injured reserve list in 2002 and 2003.

== Personal life ==
Monroe was the youngest of 7 brothers and 3 sisters. He died on May 7, 2017, after suffering a heart attack while exercising. He was 40 years old at the time of his death.
