= Wheelock, Texas =

Wheelock
- Unincorporated community
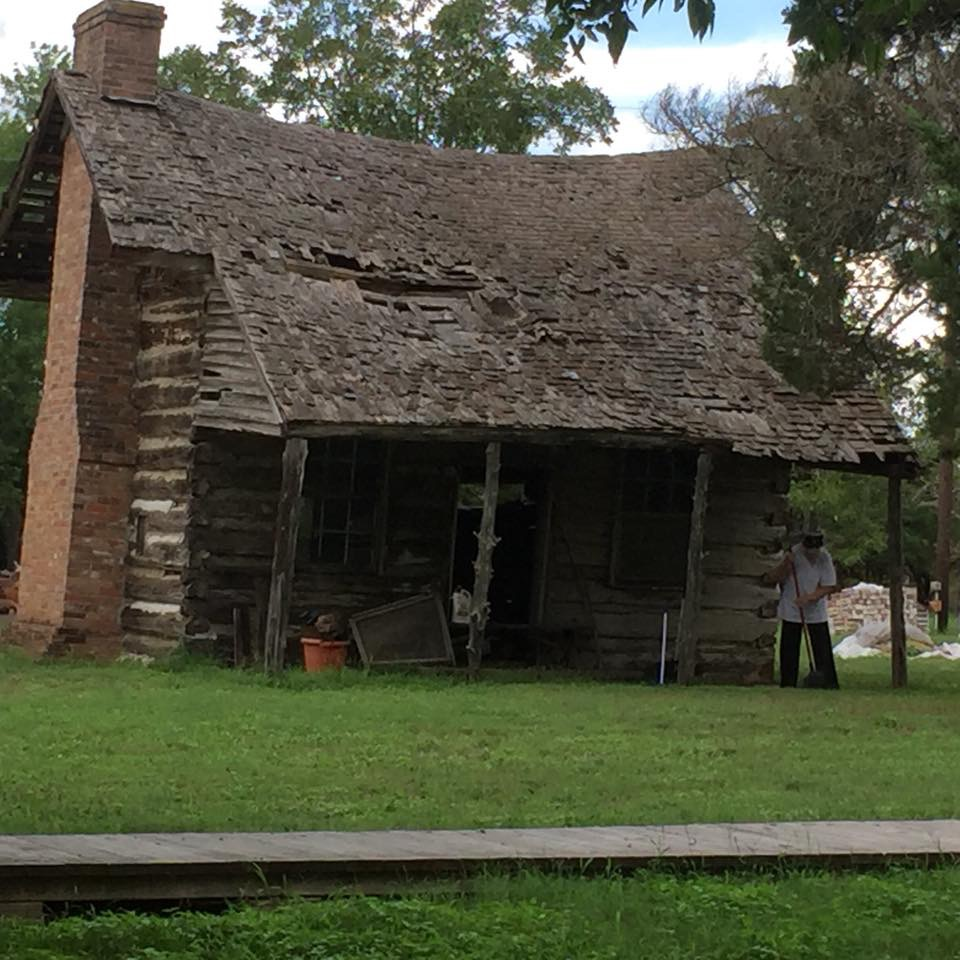
- Old Cavitt Log Cabin, official Historic Texas landmark in Wheelock

- Location within Texas Location within the United States
- Coordinates: 30°53′52″N 96°23′24″W
- Country: United States
- State: Texas
- County: Robertson
- Elevation: 436 ft (133 m)
- Time zone: UTC-6 (Central (CST))
  - Summer (DST): UTC-5 (CDT)
- Area code: 979
- GNIS feature ID: 1380767

Wheelock is an unincorporated community in Robertson County, Texas, United States. It is located 15 miles (24 km) northeast of Bryan and 11 miles (18 km) southeast of Franklin. Wheelock is located on Farm to Market Road 46 and Farm to Market Road 391. It is part of the Bryan–College Station Metropolitan Statistical Area.

== History ==
The town site of Wheelock was laid out in 1834 by founder Col. Eleazer Louis Ripley Wheelock (1793–1847), grandson of Dr. Eleazar Wheelock, D.D., the founder of Dartmouth College. It was near Dunn's Fort, an early site for protecting Anglo settlers in Robertson's Colony. Eleazer L. R. Wheelock originally planned to name the community after Texas President Mirabeau B. Lamar, but the community was named after Wheelock, Vermont in 1837. Wheelock was considered as a site for both the Texas state capitol and the University of Texas in the 1830s. Wheelock grew as a cattle ranching and cotton farming community in the 1840s, and it became one of the most well-known towns in Central Texas. A post office was set up in Wheelock in 1846. Wheelock became the county seat of Robertson County in 1850, though it lost that designation to Owensville in 1856. Wheelock began to decline in the 1860s when the railroad bypassed the town; many of its residents moved to Hearne, a nearby community with a railway station. In 2000, the population of Wheelock was estimated to be 225.

The late State Senator William T. "Bill" Moore, sometimes called "the father of the modern Texas A&M University", was born in Wheelock in 1918.

== Trivia ==
Hearne, Texas was named after the Wheelock resident who donated land for that town's railroad depot.
