= Hammond, Texas =

Hammond
- Unincorporated community
- Location within Texas Location within the United States
- Coordinates: 31°05′43″N 96°42′50″W
- Country: United States
- State: Texas
- County: Robertson
- Elevation: 397 ft (121 m)
- Time zone: UTC-6 (Central (CST))
  - Summer (DST): UTC-5 (CDT)
- Area code: 979
- GNIS feature ID: 1358706

Hammond is an unincorporated community in Robertson County, Texas, United States. Hammond is located on Texas State Highway 6, north of Calvert and south of Bremond.

== History ==
Hammond was originally the site of two plantations purchased by Dr. B.F. Hammond in 1853. After the Civil War, Hammond became a small community which primarily served former slaves from the plantation. In 1869, the Houston and Texas Central Railway built a station in Hammond. Hammond had a post office from 1870 until the 1930s. The population from 1970 to 2000 was estimated as 44.
