= New Baden, Texas =

New Baden
- Unincorporated community
- Location within Texas Location within the United States
- Coordinates: 31°03′04″N 96°25′45″W
- Country: United States
- State: Texas
- County: Robertson
- Elevation: 427 ft (130 m)
- Time zone: UTC-6 (Central (CST))
  - Summer (DST): UTC-5 (CDT)
- Area code: 979
- GNIS feature ID: 1363681

New Baden is an unincorporated community in Robertson County, Texas, United States. New Baden is located on U.S. Route 79, 4 miles (6.4 km) east of Franklin.

== History ==
New Baden was founded in 1881 by German immigrants. The community opened a post office in 1882; it later grew to contain a drugstore, a hotel, church, and railway station. The population of New Baden peaked at 175 in 1915; it declined to 105 by 1970, but rose to 150 in 2000.

== Climate ==
The climate in this area is characterized by hot, humid summers and generally mild to cool winters. According to the Köppen Climate Classification system, New Baden has a humid subtropical climate, abbreviated "Cfa" on climate maps.
