= Mumford, Texas =

- Unincorporated Community
- Interactive map of Mumford, Texas
- Coordinates: 30°44′04″N 96°33′54″W
- Country: United States
- State: Texas
- County: Robertson County
- Established: 1855
- Elevation: 259 ft (79 m)

Population (2000)
  - Total: 170
- GNIS feature ID: 1363474

Mumford is an unincorporated community in Robertson County, Texas, United States. It is part of the Bryan-College Station metropolitan area. Mumford is unincorporated and has no post office, with the ZIP code of 77867; the ZCTA for ZIP Code 77867 had a population of 176 at the 2000 census.

== History ==
Located on the eastern bank of the Brazos River, the community is named for an early resident of the area, Jesse Mumford, who established a ferry over the Brazos in the vicinity in 1855. A post office was established in Mumford in 1878, and the community continued to expand through the rest of the nineteenth century.

Mumford by 1893 also had two saloons, two barbershops, two drugstores, and several other small businesses. The first iron bridge near Mumford was erected in 1895 across the Brazos, connecting Robertson and Burleson counties. By then Mumford's population was reported as 550.

Its fortunes declined after a devastating flood in 1899, which destroyed most of the community; Mumford never attained its pre-flood prosperity. Some businesses remain in the community, which also includes a post office (located in the old General Store), an elementary and high school (part of the Mumford Independent School District, the Mustangs), and a cemetery.

== Climate ==
The climate in this area is characterized by hot, humid summers and generally mild to cool winters. According to the Köppen Climate Classification system, Mumford has a humid subtropical climate, abbreviated "Cfa" on climate maps.

== Transportation ==
The nearest airport is Hearne Municipal Airport.

Mumford lies on the junction of the Union Pacific Railroad lines connecting to Houston, and the Gulf Coast and onwards to Mexico. To the north lies Valley Junction, with lines connecting to: Austin and San Antonio; Dallas; Fort Worth; and East Texas. As a result of increasing traffic levels, in 2017 UPR purchased 1,875 acres of land in Mumford to build Brazos Yard, a large rail classification yard which will be capable of sorting up to 1,300 cars per day. The cost of the rail yard is projected at $550 Million, and when complete in 2020 the facility will employ 200 workers.

== Notable people ==
- John Randle, Hall of Fame NFL defensive tackle
- Ervin Randle, former NFL linebacker
