= Owensville, Texas =

Owensville
- Ghost town
- Location within Texas Location within the United States
- Coordinates: 31°04′23″N 96°31′10″W
- Country: United States
- State: Texas
- County: Robertson
- Elevation: 489 ft (149 m)
- GNIS feature ID: 1380317

Owensville is a former community in Robertson County, Texas, United States. Owensville was located on Farm to Market Road 46, five miles northwest of Franklin.

== History ==
Owensville was chosen as the site of Robertson County's county seat in 1855, and county records were moved from Wheelock to the courthouse in Owensville in 1856. County officials named Owensville after Harrison Owen, the first county clerk of Robertson County. A post office opened in Owensville along with the courthouse in 1856. Owensville quickly expanded and was the county seat through the Civil War, but railroads in the region bypassed the community. During Reconstruction, county judge I.B. Ellison declared Calvert the new county seat, and county records were moved from Owensville to Calvert in 1870. After Owensville lost the county seat, it rapidly declined. The post office closed in 1872, though it briefly reopened from 1895 to 1897. By 1990, all that remained in Owensville was a cemetery.
