= New Summerfield Independent School District =

School district in Texas

Address
- 13307 Hwy 110 S New Summerfield, Texas, 75780; United States

District information
- Grades: PK–12
- Schools: 1
- NCES District ID: 4832610

Students and staff
- Students: 511 (2023–24)
- Teachers: 46.24 (on an FTE basis)
- Student–teacher ratio: 11.05

Other information
- Website: www.newsummerfieldisd.org

New Summerfield Independent School District is a public independent school district based in New Summerfield, Texas, United States.

New Summerfield ISD reports a single school, New Summerfield School, to the National Center for Education Statistics (NCES). The district describes the single school as three separate schools, New Summerfield Elementary School that serves students in grades Pre-K though 5, New Summerfield Junior High serving grades 6 through 8, and New Summerfield High School that serves grades 9–12.

In 2009, the school district was rated "academically acceptable" by the Texas Education Agency.

The district changed to a four-day school week in fall 2022.
