= Panola, Texas =

Unincorporated community in Texas, US

Coordinates: 32°21′29″N 94°05′29″W

Panola is an unincorporated community in Panola County, Texas, United States. According to the Handbook of Texas, the community had an estimated population of 296 in 2000.

Panola is located at the junction of U.S. Highway 79 and FM 9 in northeastern Panola County, approximately 20 miles northeast of Carthage. Panola has a post office with the ZIP code 75685.

== Education ==
Public education in the community of Panola is provided by the Elysian Fields Independent School District.
