= New Summerfield High School =

Location
- 13307 Highway 110 South; New Summerfield, Texas 75780-0006; United States
- Coordinates: 31.979258°N 95.095015°W

Information
- School type: Public high school
- School district: New Summerfield Independent School District
- Principal: Josh Faucett
- Grades: 9–12
- Enrollment: 148 (2023–2024)
- Colors: Blue & Gold
- Athletics conference: UIL Class 2A
- Mascot: Hornet/Lady Hornet
- Website: www.newsummerfieldisd.org

New Summerfield High School is a 2A public high school located in New Summerfield, Texas, United States, serving grades 9 through 12. It is part of the single school in the New Summerfield Independent School District located in northeast Cherokee County. For the 2021–2022 school year, the PK–12 school was given a "B" by the Texas Education Agency.

== Athletics ==
The New Summerfield Hornets compete in the following sports:

- Baseball
- Basketball
- Cross Country
- Soccer
- Softball
- Tennis
- Track and Field

In 2012, a sports complex was started that will include a track, cross country course, soccer field, 2 tennis courts, baseball field, and softball field. In 2012 they almost made it to state in basketball but lost against San Augustine.
