= Pert, Texas =

- Unincorporated community
- Location within Texas Location within the United States
- Coordinates: 31°55′21″N 95°32′50″W
- Country: United States
- State: Texas
- County: Anderson
- Elevation: 482 ft (147 m)
- Time zone: UTC-6 (Central (CST))
  - Summer (DST): UTC-5 (CDT)
- Area codes: 430 & 903
- GNIS feature ID: 1380343

Pert is an unincorporated community in Anderson County, in the U.S. state of Texas. According to the Handbook of Texas, the community had a population of 20 in 2000. It is located within the Palestine, Texas micropolitan area.

== Geography ==
Pert lies at the junction of Texas State Highway 155 and Farm to Market Roads 435 and 2267, approximately 12 mi (19 km) northeast of Palestine in northeastern Anderson County.

== Education ==
The post office was used as a school in Pert after it closed in 1905. It also had a school in the early 1920s. Today the community is served by the Neches Independent School District.
