= Neches High School =

Public school in Texas, United States

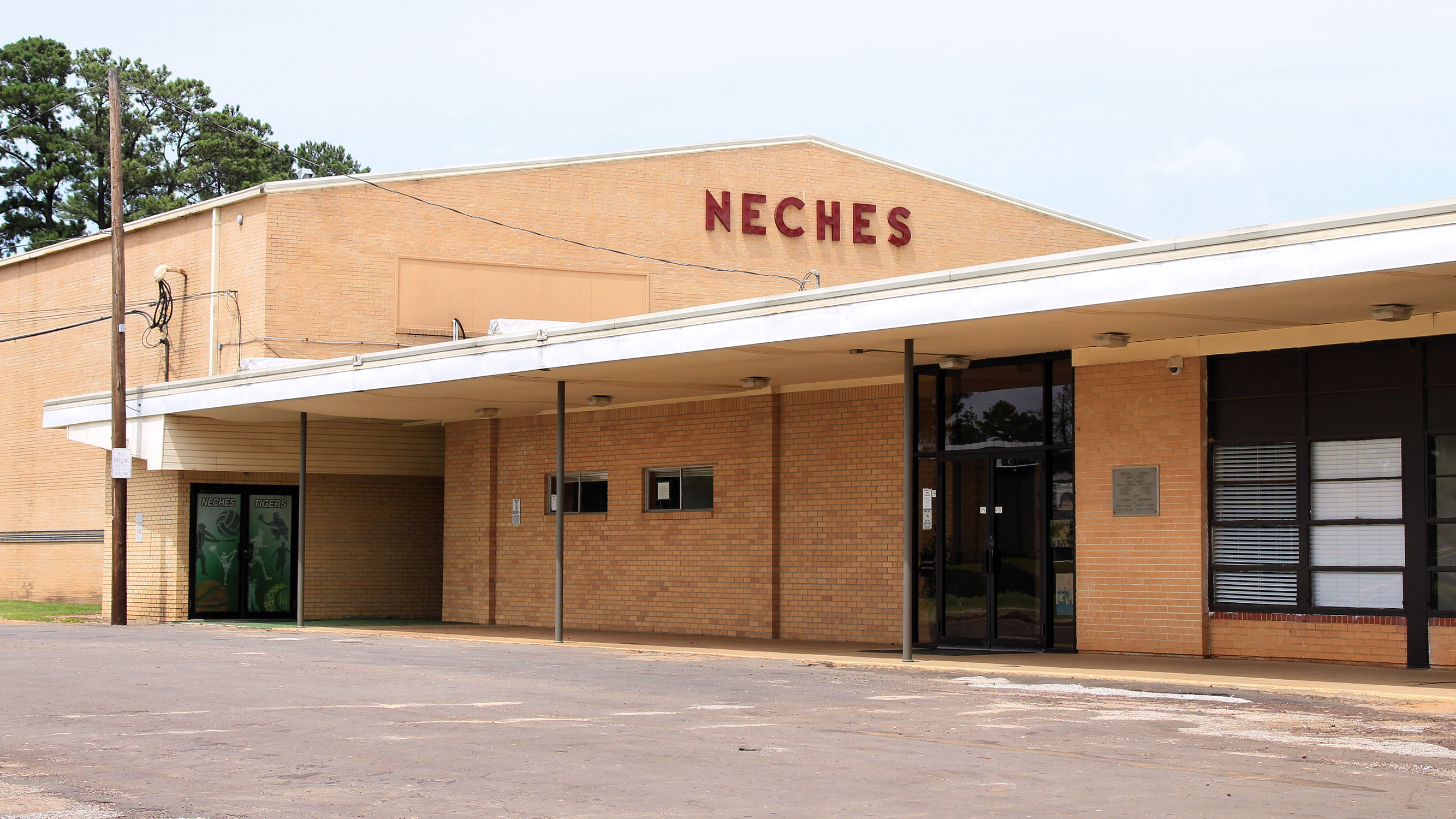

Location
- Highway 79 & County Road 346; Neches, Anderson County, Texas 75779-0310; United States; 31.875050°N 95.475827°W

Information
- School type: Public, high school
- Locale: Rural: Distant
- School district: Neches ISD
- NCES School ID: 481977001939
- Principal: Trent Cook
- Faculty: 15.30 (on an FTE basis)
- Grades: 9–12
- Enrollment: 146 (2023–2024)
- Student to teacher ratio: 9.54
- Colors: Green & White
- Athletics conference: UIL Class A
- Mascot: Tigers/Lady Tigers
- Website: Neches High School

Neches High School is a public high school located in unincorporated Neches, Texas, and classified as a 1A school by the UIL. It is part of the Neches Independent School District located in central Anderson County. During 2023-2024, Neches High School had an enrollment of 146 students and a student to teacher ratio of 9.54. The school received an A from the Texas Education Agency for the 2022–2023 school year.

== Athletics ==
The Neches Tigers compete in the following sports

- Baseball
- Basketball
- Cross Country
- Golf
- Softball
- Tennis
- Track and Field
- Volleyball

=== State titles ===
Neches (UIL)

- Girls Basketball
  - 1973(B), 1976(B), 2010(1A/D2), 2011(1A/D2), 2012(1A/D2)
- Volleyball
  - 2018 (1A), 2019 (1A), 2020 (1A)

==== State finalists ====
Neches (UIL)

- Boys Basketball
  - 2004(1A/D2)
- Girls Basketball
  - 1975(1A), 2009(1A/D2)
- Softball
  - 2024(1A)
- Volleyball
  - 2024(1A)

Neches Clemons (PVIL)

- Boys Basketball
  - 1961(PVIL-1A)
