= Franklin Independent School District =

School district in Texas

Address
- 1216 West FM 1644 Franklin, Texas, 77856; United States

District information
- Type: Public
- Grades: PK–12
- Schools: 3
- NCES District ID: 4819740

Students and staff
- Students: 1,387 (2023–2024)
- Teachers: 125.71 (on an FTE basis) (2023–2024)
- Staff: 149.06 (on an FTE basis) (2023–2024)
- Student–teacher ratio: 11.03 (2023–2024)

Other information
- Website: www.franklinisd.net

Franklin Independent School District is a public school district based in Franklin, Texas, United States.

In 2009, the school district was rated "recognized" by the Texas Education Agency.

== Schools ==
- Franklin High School (Grades 9-12)
- Franklin Middle (Grades 5-8)
- Reynolds Elementary (Grades PK-4)

== Notable alumni ==
- Frank Estes Cole (Class of 1925), educator and member of both houses of the Louisiana State Legislature between 1944 and 1960
