= Marquez, Texas =

- City
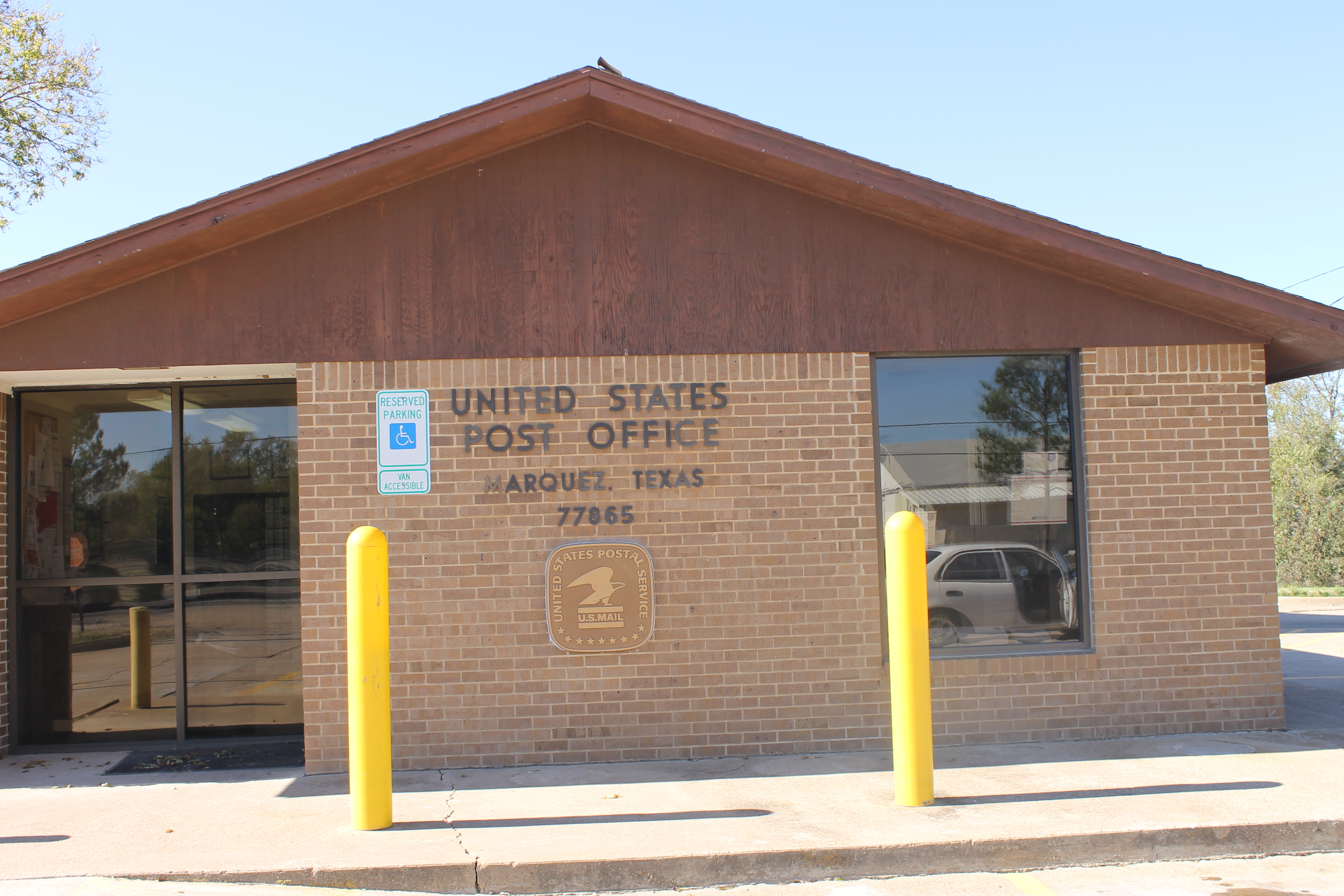
- Marquez Post Office

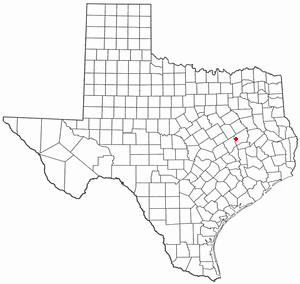
- Location of Marquez, Texas

- Coordinates: 31°14′12″N 96°15′13″W
- Country: United States
- State: Texas
- County: Leon

Area
  - Total: 1.31 sq mi (3.40 km^{2})
  - Land: 1.31 sq mi (3.40 km^{2})
  - Water: 0 sq mi (0.00 km^{2})
- Elevation: 413 ft (126 m)

Population (2020)
  - Total: 181
  - Density: 138/sq mi (53.2/km^{2})
- Time zone: UTC-6 (Central (CST))
  - Summer (DST): UTC-5 (CDT)
- ZIP code: 77865
- Area codes: 903, 430
- FIPS code: 48-46752
- GNIS feature ID: 2411039

Marquez (/mɑːrˈkeɪ/ mar-KAY) is a city in Leon County, Texas, United States. The population was 181 at the 2020 census.

== Geography ==
According to the United States Census Bureau, the city has a total area of 1.2 square miles (3.1 km^{2}), all land.

== Demographics ==
Historical population
Census	Pop.	Note	%±
1940	381		—
1950	287		−24.7%
1960	194		−32.4%
1970	185		−4.6%
1980	231		24.9%
1990	270		16.9%
2000	220		−18.5%
2010	263		19.5%
2020	181		−31.2%
U.S. Decennial Census; 2020 Census

=== 2020 census ===
As of the 2020 census, Marquez had a population of 181. The median age was 39.5 years, with 27.6% of residents under the age of 18 and 14.9% aged 65 or older. For every 100 females there were 88.5 males, and for every 100 females age 18 and over there were 95.5 males age 18 and over.

The 2020 census reported that 0.0% of residents lived in urban areas while 100.0% lived in rural areas.

As of the 2020 census there were 81 households in Marquez, of which 27.2% had children under the age of 18 living in them. Of all households, 29.6% were married-couple households, 29.6% were households with a male householder and no spouse or partner present, and 33.3% were households with a female householder and no spouse or partner present. About 39.5% of all households were made up of individuals and 8.7% had someone living alone who was 65 years of age or older.

As of the 2020 census there were 92 housing units, of which 12.0% were vacant. The homeowner vacancy rate was 0.0% and the rental vacancy rate was 8.0%.

Racial composition as of the 2020 census
Race	Number	Percent
White	144	79.6%
Black or African American	10	5.5%
American Indian and Alaska Native	3	1.7%
Asian	0	0.0%
Native Hawaiian and Other Pacific Islander	0	0.0%
Some other race	15	8.3%
Two or more races	9	5.0%
Hispanic or Latino (of any race)	49	27.1%

=== 2000 census ===
As of the 2000 census, 220 people, 90 households, and 59 families were residing in the city. The population density was 183.3 inhabitants per square mile (70.8/km^{2}). The 113 housing units had an average density of 94.1 per square mile (36.3/km^{2}). The racial makeup of the city was 81.82% White, 8.64% African American, 1.36% Native American, and 8.18% from other races. Hispanics or Latinos of any race were 12.27% of the population.

Of the 90 households, 31.1% had children under 18 living with them, 52.2% were married couples living together, 11.1% had a female householder with no husband present, and 34.4% were not families. About 33.3% of all households were made up of individuals, and 20.0% had someone living alone who was 65 or older. The average household size was 2.44 and the average family size was 3.14.

In the city, the age distribution was 25.9% under 18, 5.5% from 18 to 24, 25.5% from 25 to 44, 22.7% from 45 to 64, and 20.5% who were 65 or older. The median age was 41 years. For every 100 females, there were 94.7 males. For every 100 females 18 and over, there were 87.4 males.

The median income for a household in the city was $18,333 and for a family was $34,375. Males had a median income of $29,286 versus $12,250 for females. The per capita income for the city was $14,122. About 27.9% of families and 29.1% of the population were below the poverty line, including 34.1% of those under 18 and 22.7% of those 65 or over.

== Education ==
The City of Marquez is served by the Leon Independent School District.
