= Bald Prairie, Texas =

Unincorporated community in Texas, US

Coordinates: 31°13′25″N 96°25′58″W

Bald Prairie is an unincorporated community in Robertson County, in the U.S. state of Texas.

== History ==
Bald Prairie was founded in 1865, and named after the wide prairies surrounding the original town site. A post office was established at Bald Prairie in 1875, and remained in operation until it was discontinued in 1950.
