= Neches, Texas =

Neches
- Unincorporated community Census designated place
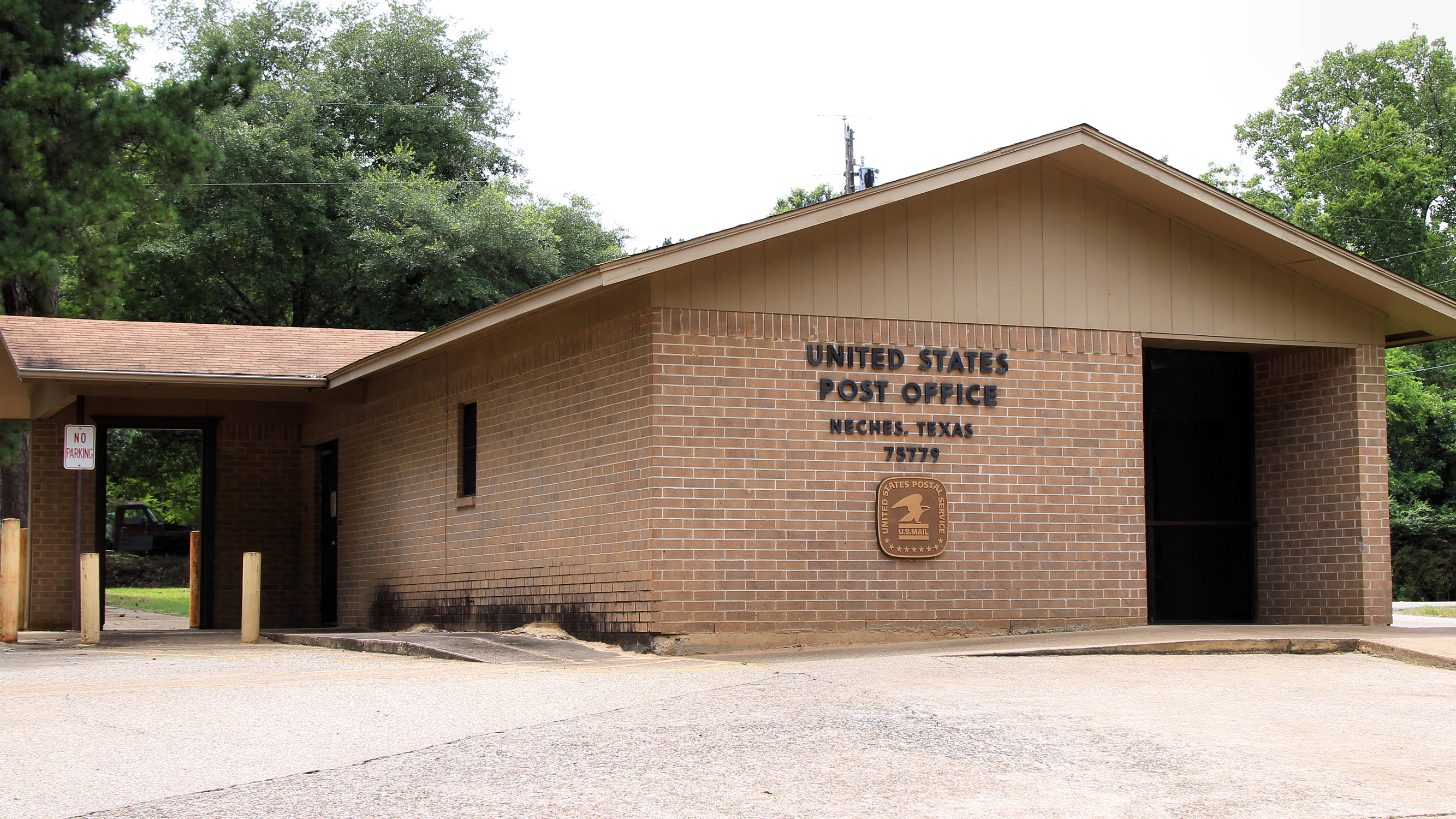
- Neches Post Office

- Location within the state of Texas Neches (the United States)
- Coordinates: 31°52′10″N 95°29′35″W
- Country: United States
- State: Texas
- County: Anderson
- Elevation: 427 ft (130 m)
- Time zone: UTC-6 (Central (CST))
  - Summer (DST): UTC-5 (CDT)
- ZIP codes: 75779
- Area codes: 903, 430
- GNIS feature ID: 2805726

Neches is an unincorporated community and census designated place (CDP) in east central Anderson County, in the U.S. state of Texas. As of the 2020 census, Neches had a population of 266. It is located within the Palestine, Texas micropolitan area.

== History ==
In 1872, the International-Great Northern Railroad was built through the area of Neches. J.J. Davis and Murdock McDonald, local landowners, donated land to be used for the expansion of the townsite and a train station.

Neches' first post office, which opened the same year as the town, was called Nechesville. A Masonic lodge, two steam-powered sawmills, a gristmill, two churches, two general stores, and two saloons were in operation in the community by 1884 and the community had 100 inhabitants living in it. The community shipped lumber. Two cotton gins and a hotel were then added to the community's business directory by 1890 and had a large growth in population with 400 settlers. A local store owner named J.B. McDonald also acted as Justice of the Peace in Nechesville and advertised as a supplier of "meats and justice." The community's name was then changed to Neches in 1892. The community then published two newspapers: the Southern Poultry Journal in 1896 and the Neches Tribune before the 1930s. Its population decreased to 261 people in 1900 and then grew back to 400 in the 1920s, which stayed around that in the 1930s. Neches had 24 businesses operating, as well as a population zenith of 900 in 1939, making it an extremely successful community. It began to fade not long after. Its population plunged to 280 in 1949 and continued to fall to 111 in 1970. There were three churches, two community halls, and six operating businesses in 1985. Its population grew to 114 in 1990 and then jumped some more to 175 in 2000.

Although it is unincorporated, Neches has a post office, with the ZIP code 75779.

On May 11, 1953, a possible tornado struck Neches, tearing the roof off of a home.

During the Battle of Nacogdoches, James Bradshaw brought a company from Neches as a call to arms.

== Geography ==
Neches lies at the junction of U.S. Highway 79, as well as Farm to Market Roads 321 and 2574, along the Union Pacific Railroad, 9 mi (14 km) northeast of Palestine and 4 mi (6.4 km) from the Neches River in eastern Anderson County. It is also located 14 mi (23 km) southwest of Jacksonville and 40 mi (64 km) southwest of Tyler.

=== Climate ===
The climate in this area is characterized by hot, humid summers and generally mild to cool winters. According to the Köppen Climate Classification system, Neches has a humid subtropical climate, abbreviated "Cfa" on climate maps.

== Demographics ==
Historical population
| Census | Pop. | Note | %± |
|---|---|---|---|
| 2020 | 266 | | — |
U.S. Decennial Census; 1850–1900 1910; 1920 1930 1940; 1950 1960 1970; 1980 1990 2000; 2010 2020

Neches first appeared as a census designated place in the 2020 U.S. census.

=== 2020 census ===
Neches CDP, Texas – Racial and ethnic composition Note: the US Census treats Hispanic/Latino as an ethnic category. This table excludes Latinos from the racial categories and assigns them to a separate category. Hispanics/Latinos may be of any race.
| Race / Ethnicity (NH = Non-Hispanic) | Pop 2020 | % 2020 |
|---|---|---|
| White alone (NH) | 221 | 83.08% |
| Black or African American alone (NH) | 6 | 2.26% |
| Native American or Alaska Native alone (NH) | 1 | 0.38% |
| Asian alone (NH) | 3 | 1.13% |
| Pacific Islander alone (NH) | 0 | 0.00% |
| Other race alone (NH) | 2 | 0.75% |
| Mixed race or Multiracial (NH) | 13 | 4.89% |
| Hispanic or Latino (any race) | 20 | 7.52% |
| Total | 266 | 100.00% |

== Education ==
The first school was built in the community in 1872 and another one appeared in 1884. A charter school called Stovall Academy was in operation three miles from Neches in 1866. It was then moved to the settlement and was renamed the Neches Normal Institute and then Neches High School, which it currently goes by to this day. It also had a school in 1985.

Today, the community is served by the Neches Independent School District, which is home to the Neches High School Tigers.

== Notable person ==
- Lenora Rolla, activist, educator, and historian; lived in Neches until the age of five.

== Sources ==
- Grazulis, Thomas (1993), Significant Tornadoes 1680–1991: A Chronology and Analysis of Events, St. Johnsbury, Vermont: Environmental Films, ISBN 1-879362-03-1
