= Neches Independent School District =

School district in Texas, United States

Location
- Neches, Texas ESC Region 7 USA

District information
- Type: Public Independent school district
- Grades: EE through 12
- Superintendent: Randy Snider
- Schools: 2
- NCES District ID: 4832250

Students and staff
- Students: 326 (2023–2024)
- Teachers: 30.79 (on an FTE basis) (2023–2024)
- Staff: 32.72 (on an FTE basis) (2023–2024)
- Student–teacher ratio: 10.59 (2023–2024)

Other information
- Website: www.nechesisd.com

Neches Independent School District is a public school district for students grades PK-12 based in the community of Neches, an unincorporated community in Anderson County, Texas (USA). The district recently opened a new elementary/junior high in the fall of 2010.

Located in east central Anderson County, the district has two schools:

- Neches High School (Grades 9-12)
- Neches Elementary/Jr High School (Grades EE-8)

In 2009, the school district was rated "academically acceptable" by the Texas Education Agency.
