= Mumford Independent School District =

School district in Texas, United States

Address
- 9755 FM 50 Mumford, Texas, 77807; United States

District information
- Type: Public
- Grades: PK–12
- Schools: 2
- NCES District ID: 4831950

Students and staff
- Students: 600 (2023–2024)
- Teachers: 39.82 (on an FTE basis) (2023–2024)
- Staff: 32.16 (on an FTE basis) (2023–2024)
- Student–teacher ratio: 15.07 (2023–2024)

Other information
- Website: www.mumford.k12.tx.us

Mumford Independent School District is a public school district based in the community of Mumford, Texas (USA).

The district has currently two campuses - Mumford High School and Mumford Elementary. These are housed in five buildings: The High School building serves grades 8 to 12 and houses the high school gymnasium, the Destefano-Scamardo building serves grades 6-7, the Elementary building serves grades 3 to 5 and is home to the administrative staff, the Collier-Foyt building which serves Pre-K 3 to 2nd grade and also houses the third (smaller) practice gymnasium and the music hall, and lastly, a 969 seat competition gymnasium housing six locker rooms, coaches offices, weight room, trainer's room, and cafeteria.

In 2009, the school district was rated "exemplary" by the Texas Education Agency.

In 2018, Mumford Elementary was named a Blue Ribbon School by U.S. Department of Education. In 2025, Mumford Elementary was named a Texas Governor's Lone Star Ribbon School for high academic achievement (in place of the Blue Ribbon School award, no longer supported by the U.S. Department of Education).

The district has been featured by the Texas Public Policy Foundation for its high academic achievement while maintaining extremely conservative finances and a very lean overhead. The district has only eight administrative and professional staff (including the school secretary and administrative assistant) and 21 total non-teaching staff while having 37 teachers and ten teachers aides. Also, the district has no outstanding debt and enough cash reserve to operate for three years. Despite the lack of financial spending, and with a high percentage of economically-disadvantaged students (75.9 percent compared to 60.4 statewide), students scored higher than average on the SAT (1459 vs. the statewide average of 1422, with Hispanic students average even better at 1463).
