= Hearne Independent School District =

School district in Texas, United States

Address
- 900 Wheelock Street Hearne, Texas, 77859; United States

District information
- Type: Public
- Grades: PK–12
- Schools: 2
- NCES District ID: 4822830

Students and staff
- Students: 764 (2023–2024)
- Teachers: 81.29 (on an FTE basis) (2023–2024)
- Staff: 115.56 (on an FTE basis) (2023–2024)
- Student–teacher ratio: 9.40 (2023–2024)

Other information
- Website: www.hearneisd.com/en-US

Hearne Independent School District is a public school district based in Hearne, Texas (US).

The Education Agency reversed its own order to remove the entire board of trustees and superintendent and instead appoint a full-time TEA conservator.

In 2018, the Texas Education Agency rated the school district 'F' for failing.

== Schools ==
- Hearne High (Grades 9-12)
- Hearne Junior High (Grades 7-8)
- Hearne Elementary (Grades PK-6)
