= Hearne, Texas =

- City
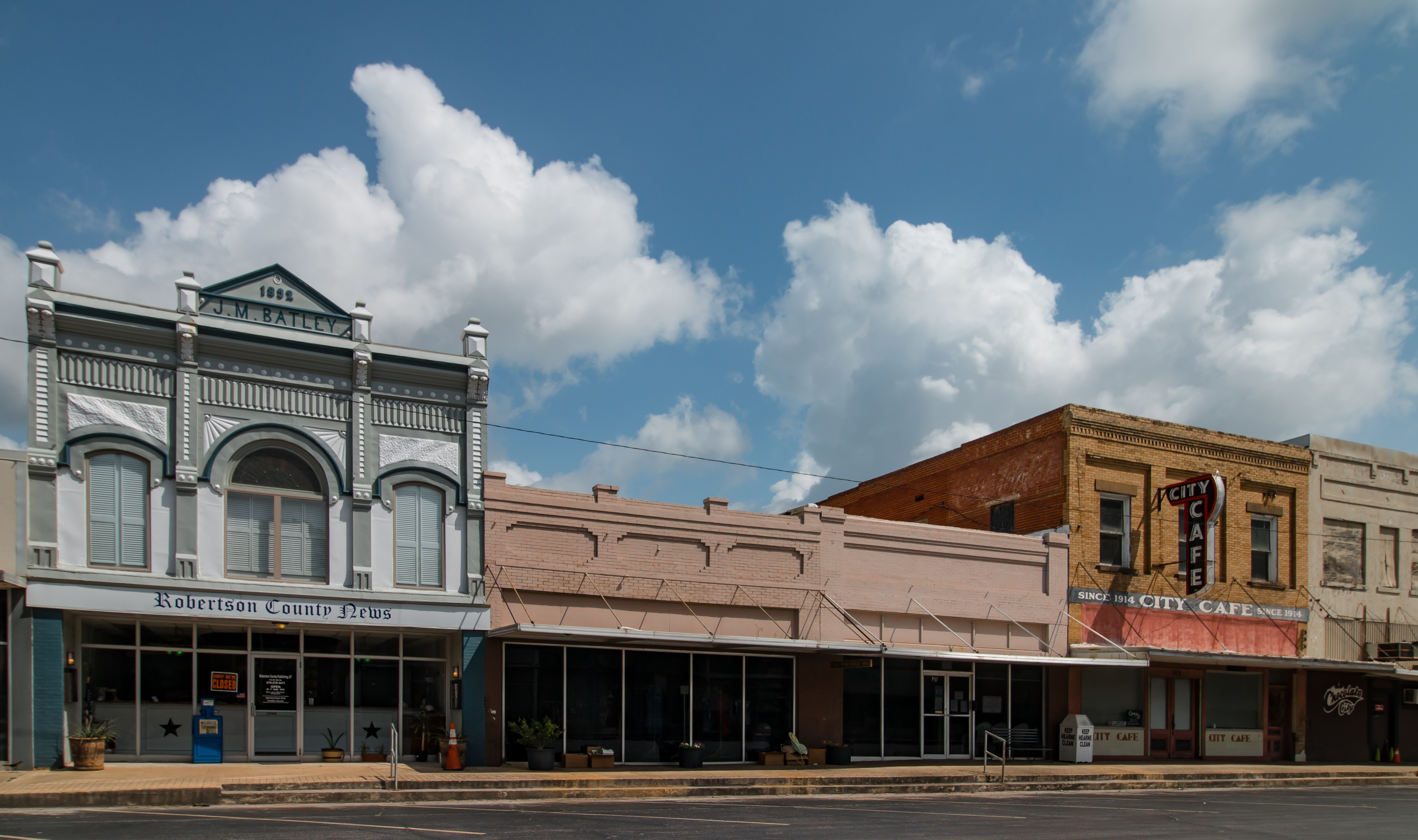
- Downtown Hearne, Texas (2017)

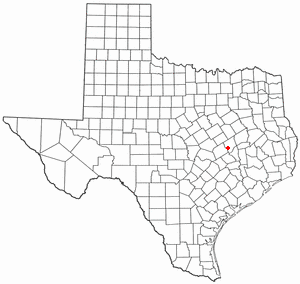
- Location of Hearne within Texas
- Coordinates: 30°52′21″N 96°35′38″W
- Country: United States
- State: Texas
- County: Robertson

Area
  - Total: 4.12 sq mi (10.68 km^{2})
  - Land: 4.12 sq mi (10.67 km^{2})
  - Water: 0.0039 sq mi (0.01 km^{2})
- Elevation: 295 ft (90 m)

Population (2020)
  - Total: 4,544
  - Density: 1,056.7/sq mi (408.01/km^{2})
- Time zone: UTC-6 (Central (CST))
  - Summer (DST): UTC-5 (CDT)
- ZIP code: 77859
- Area code: 979
- FIPS code: 48-32972
- GNIS feature ID: 2410728
- Website: www.cityofhearne.org

Hearne (/hɜːrn/ hurn) is a city in Robertson County, Texas, United States. As of the 2020 census, its population was 4,544. The city is named for a family who settled in the area in the 19th century and promoted the construction of rail lines through the city.

== History ==
=== Founding ===
Hearne is located on land that initially belonged to politician and soldier José Francisco Ruiz. By the 1840s, a tavern was located there, and it also served as a general store and post office. The Hearne family moved to the area in the 1850s, purchasing 10,000 acres and operating cotton plantations. Christopher C. Hearne wanted a railroad line built through the area, but the Civil War started before the railroad could be constructed. His widow later gave 700 acres to the Houston and Texas Central Railway.

With the construction of a depot in Hearne in 1868, businesses began to open, including a hotel, saloons, churches, and a cotton gin. Two rail lines met in Hearne by the 1870s. Hearne's population was 2,129 in 1900 and 3,511 in 1940. Between 1943 and 1946, a prison camp operating near the city limits held several thousand German prisoners of war. Agricultural and manufacturing businesses came to Hearne by the 1960s. By 1990, over 5,000 people lived in Hearne; the population was 4,690 in 2000.

=== Wal-Mart closure ===
On New Year's Eve 1990, the Wal-Mart in Hearne closed. After closure, the store was converted into the current Hearne High School. Merchants in downtown Hearne by that time had already folded their businesses because they were unable to compete with Wal-Mart. The New York Times reported that out of more than 1,500 Wal-Mart stores in the nation, the Hearne store was one of six that had closed.

=== Drug sweeps and ACLU lawsuit ===
In November 2000, 15 African-American residents of Hearne were indicted on drug charges after being arrested in a series of "drug sweeps". The ACLU filed a class-action lawsuit, Kelly v. Paschall, on their behalf, alleging that the arrests were unlawful. The ACLU contended that 15% of Hearne's male African-American population aged 18 to 34 (and at least one woman) were arrested based on the "uncorroborated word of a single unreliable confidential informant coerced by police to make cases." The government had promised the informant leniency on a burglary charge and $100 in cash in exchange for each suspect he helped convict.

On May 11, 2005, the ACLU and Robertson County announced a confidential settlement of the lawsuit, an outcome with which "both sides stated that they were satisfied." District Attorney John Paschall dismissed the charges against the plaintiffs of the suit. He also admitted that the witness had tampered with evidence and failed a polygraph test.

A movie, American Violet, was made about the incident.

=== Shooting of Pearlie Golden ===
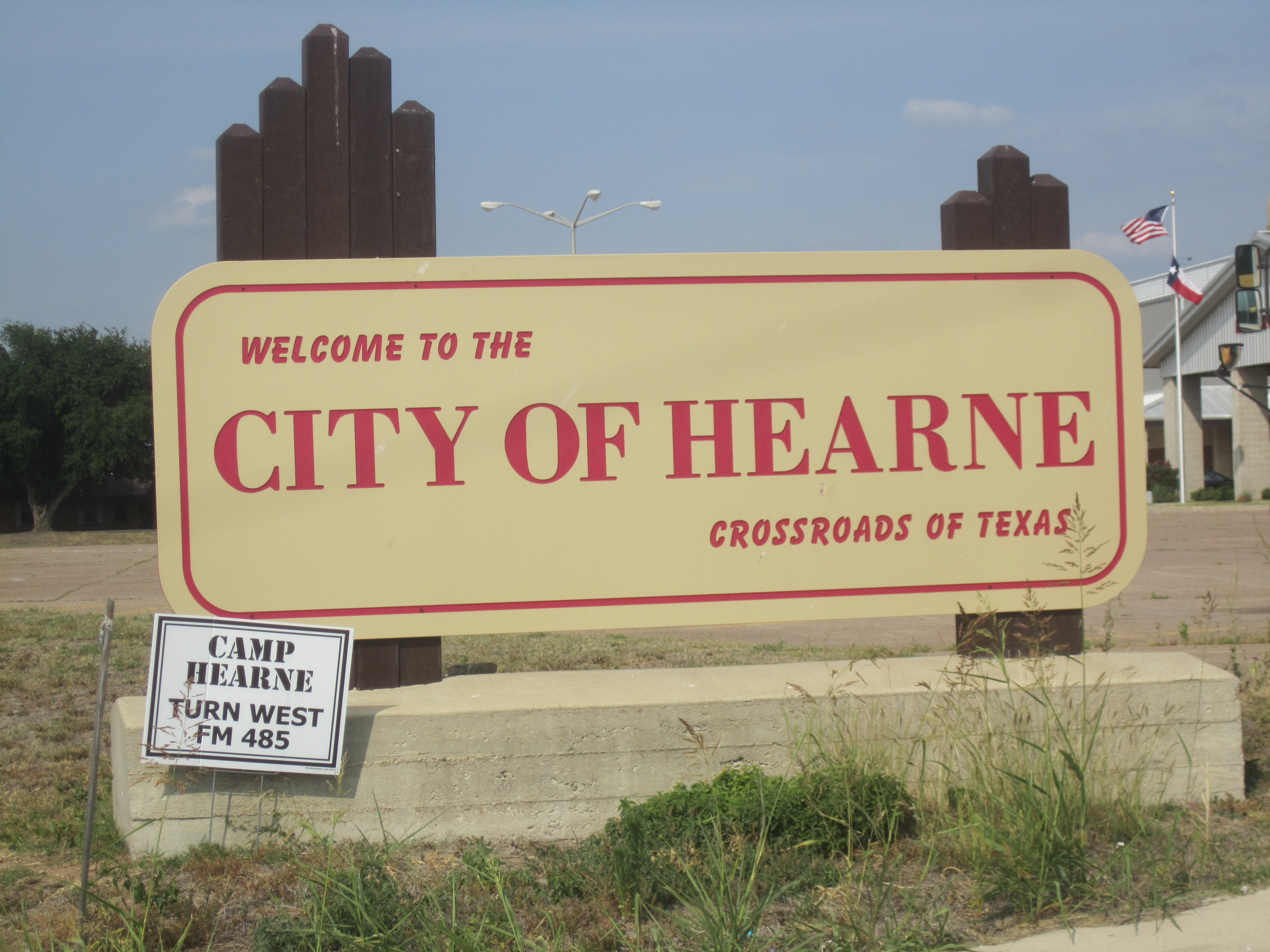

In May 2014, protesters demonstrated against the shooting of a 93-year-old woman named Pearlie Golden by the Hearne Police Department. After Officer Stephen Stem responded to a disturbance at Golden's residence, police officials said that Golden had discharged a firearm into the ground twice. Stem shot Golden three times, resulting in her death.

The officer had been on the police force since 2012, and it was his second fatal shooting. Stem was placed on leave and Hearne Mayor Ruben Gomez recommended Stem's firing. He was terminated by a unanimous city council vote. Stem's attorney said that some community members had turned a safety issue into one focused on age, race, and gender.

== Geography ==
According to the United States Census Bureau, the city has a total area of 4.1 square miles (11 km^{2}), all land. General aviation service is provided by Hearne Municipal Airport.

=== Climate ===
The climate in this area is characterized by hot, humid summers and generally mild to cool winters. According to the Köppen climate classification, Hearne has a humid subtropical climate, Cfa on climate maps. Hearne was subjected to heavy flooding on May 13, 2004 when 17 inches (430 mm) of rain fell in an hour.

== Demographics ==
Historical population
| Census | Pop. | Note | %± |
|---|---|---|---|
| 1880 | 1,421 | | — |
| 1900 | 2,129 | | — |
| 1910 | 2,352 | | 10.5% |
| 1920 | 2,741 | | 16.5% |
| 1930 | 2,956 | | 7.8% |
| 1940 | 3,511 | | 18.8% |
| 1950 | 4,872 | | 38.8% |
| 1960 | 5,072 | | 4.1% |
| 1970 | 4,982 | | −1.8% |
| 1980 | 5,418 | | 8.8% |
| 1990 | 5,132 | | −5.3% |
| 2000 | 4,690 | | −8.6% |
| 2010 | 4,459 | | −4.9% |
| 2020 | 4,544 | | 1.9% |
U.S. Decennial Census

Hearne is part of the Bryan-College Station metropolitan area.

=== Racial and ethnic composition ===
Racial composition as of the 2020 census
| Race | Number | Percent |
|---|---|---|
| White | 1,406 | 30.9% |
| Black or African American | 1,768 | 38.9% |
| American Indian and Alaska Native | 39 | 0.9% |
| Asian | 10 | 0.2% |
| Native Hawaiian and Other Pacific Islander | 6 | 0.1% |
| Some other race | 809 | 17.8% |
| Two or more races | 506 | 11.1% |
| Hispanic or Latino (of any race) | 1,786 | 39.3% |

=== 2020 census ===
As of the 2020 census, Hearne had a population of 4,544. The median age was 35.0 years. 28.7% of residents were under the age of 18 and 13.8% of residents were 65 years of age or older.

For every 100 females there were 90.4 males, and for every 100 females age 18 and over there were 86.8 males age 18 and over.

0.0% of residents lived in urban areas, while 100.0% lived in rural areas.

There were 1,668 households in Hearne, of which 38.1% had children under the age of 18 living in them. Of all households, 36.5% were married-couple households, 20.1% were households with a male householder and no spouse or partner present, and 37.5% were households with a female householder and no spouse or partner present. About 28.4% of all households were made up of individuals and 12.6% had someone living alone who was 65 years of age or older.

There were 1,915 housing units, of which 12.9% were vacant. The homeowner vacancy rate was 1.9% and the rental vacancy rate was 9.7%.

=== 2000 census ===
As of the census of 2000, 4,690 people, 1,710 households, and 1,190 families resided in the city. The population density was 1,144.2 inhabitants per square mile (441.8/km^{2}). The 1,944 housing units had an average density of 474.3 per square mile (183.1/km^{2}). The racial makeup of the city was 44.41% African American, 38.12% White (including Hispanics), 0.49% Native American, 0.17% Asian, 0.04% Pacific Islander, 14.48% from other races, and 2.28% from two or more races. Hispanics or Latinos of any race were 28.10% of the population.

Of the 1,710 households, 36.7% had children under 18 living with them, 39.2% were married couples living together, 25.6% had a female householder with no husband present, and 30.4% were not families. About 27.8% of all households were made up of individuals, and 15.4% had someone living alone who was 65 or older. The average household size was 2.70 and the average family size was 3.31.

In the city, the age distribution was 32.9% under 18, 9.1% from 18 to 24, 24.3% from 25 to 44, 18.7% from 45 to 64, and 15.1% who were 65 or older. The median age was 32 years. For every 100 females, there were 84.4 males. For every 100 females 18 and over, there were 77.8 males.

The median income for a household in the city was $19,556, and for a family was $25,538. Males had a median income of $24,013 versus $19,306 for females. The per capita income for the city was $9,716. About 29.2% of families and 31.2% of the population were below the poverty line, including 45.2% of those under age 18 and 25.8% of those 65 or over.

== Education ==
Hearne High School, an entity of the Hearne Independent School District, was a Texas Education Agency "recognized" campus in 2008. The Hearne Junior High School was a "recognized" campus in 2010 and Hearne Elementary School received the "academically acceptable" rating from TEA in 2013

== Notable people ==
- Chalie Boy, is an American hip-hop recording artist
- Patrick Edwards, former NFL wide receiver
- Lance Hoyt, professional wrestler working for All Elite Wrestling
- R. Bowen Loftin, former president of Texas A&M University
- Donald Ray Middlebrooks, convicted American murderer, death-row inmate
- Rodrick Monroe, former NFL tight end
- Steve O'Neal, former American football punter and wide receiver
- John Randle, Hall of Fame NFL defensive tackle
- Jose Francisco Ruiz, the original grantee of nine leagues of land that comprise Hearne
- David Schnaufer, (1952–2006) dulcimer virtuoso and first professor of dulcimer

== Images ==
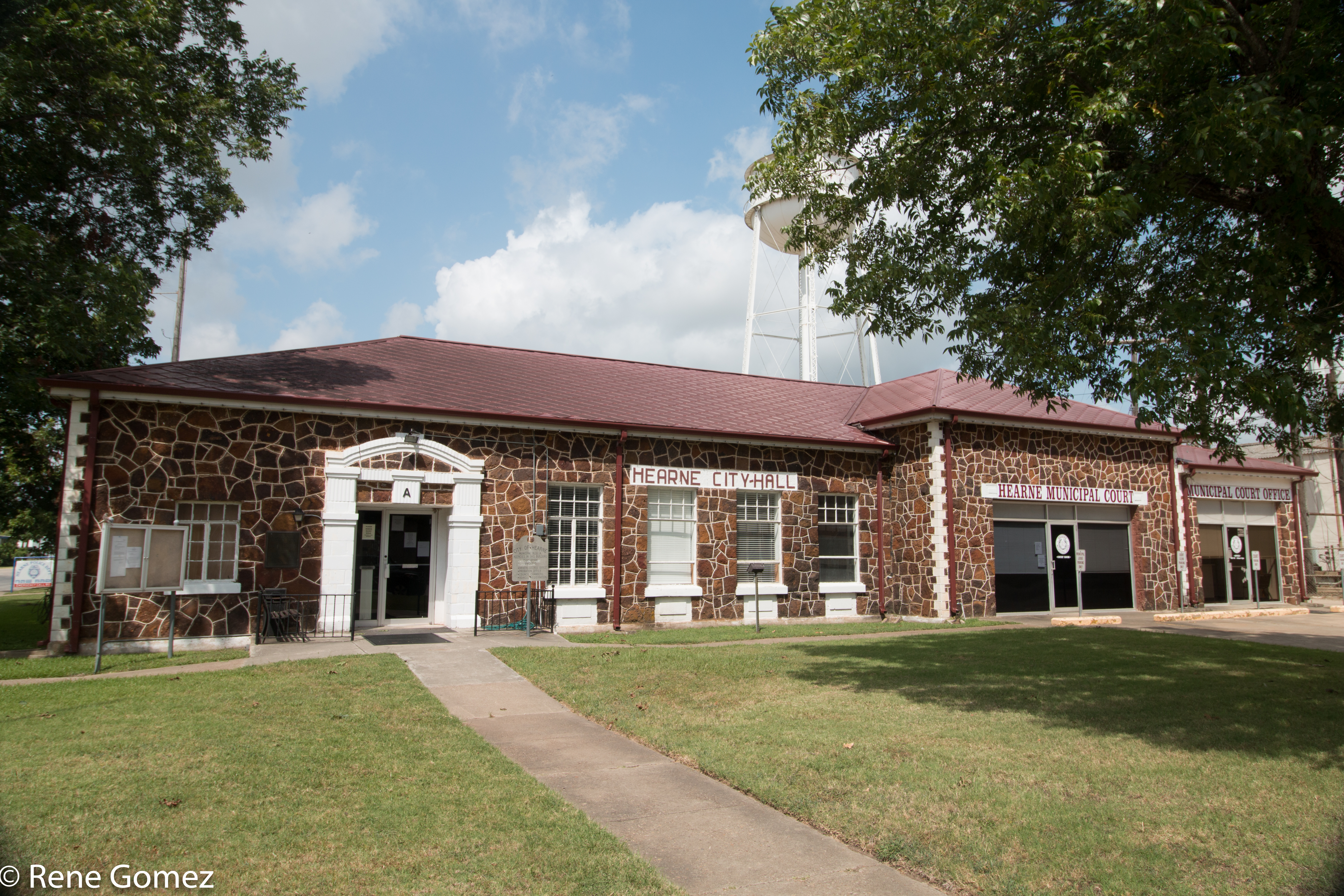
Hearne City Hall

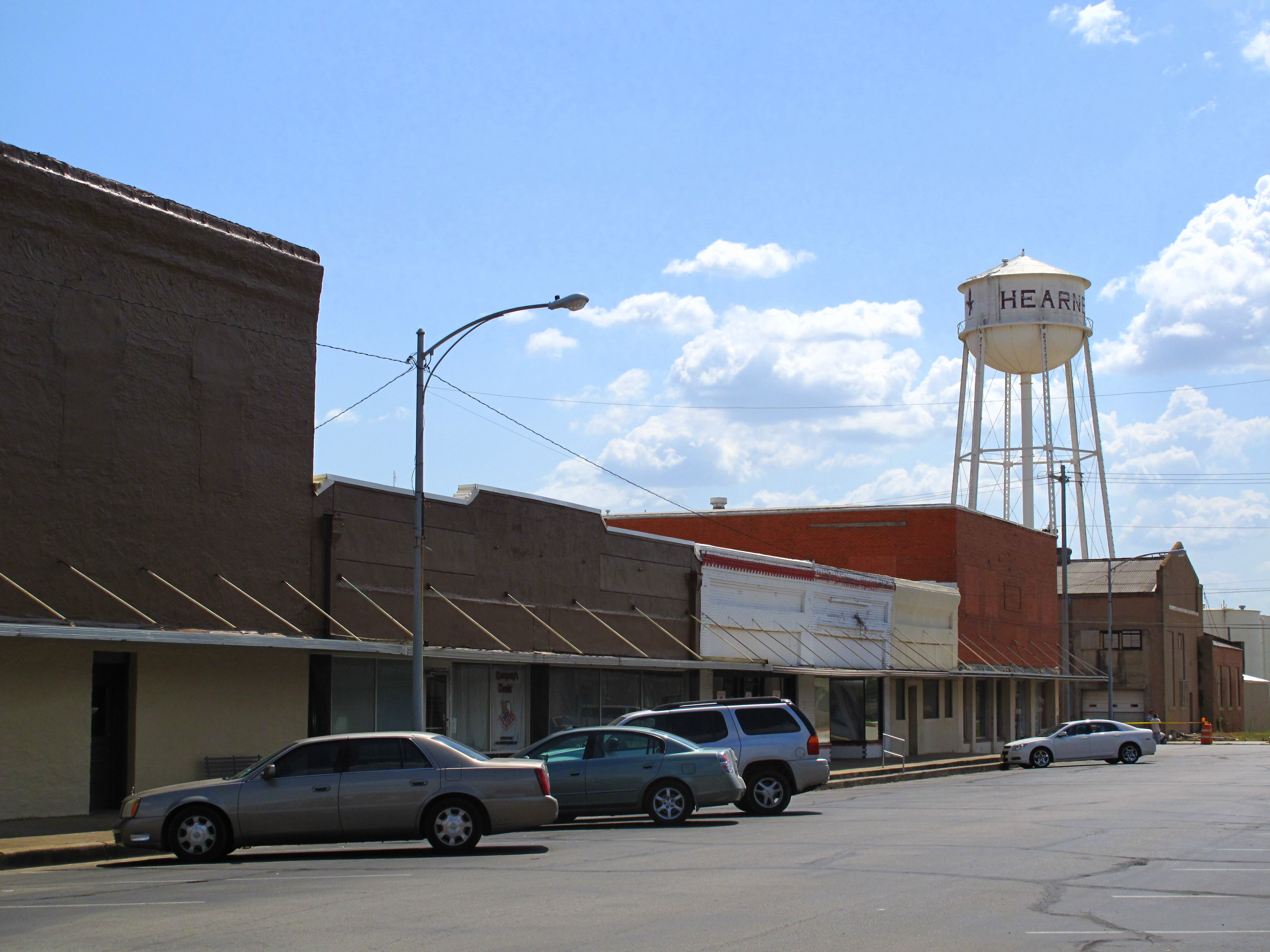
Downtown Hearne

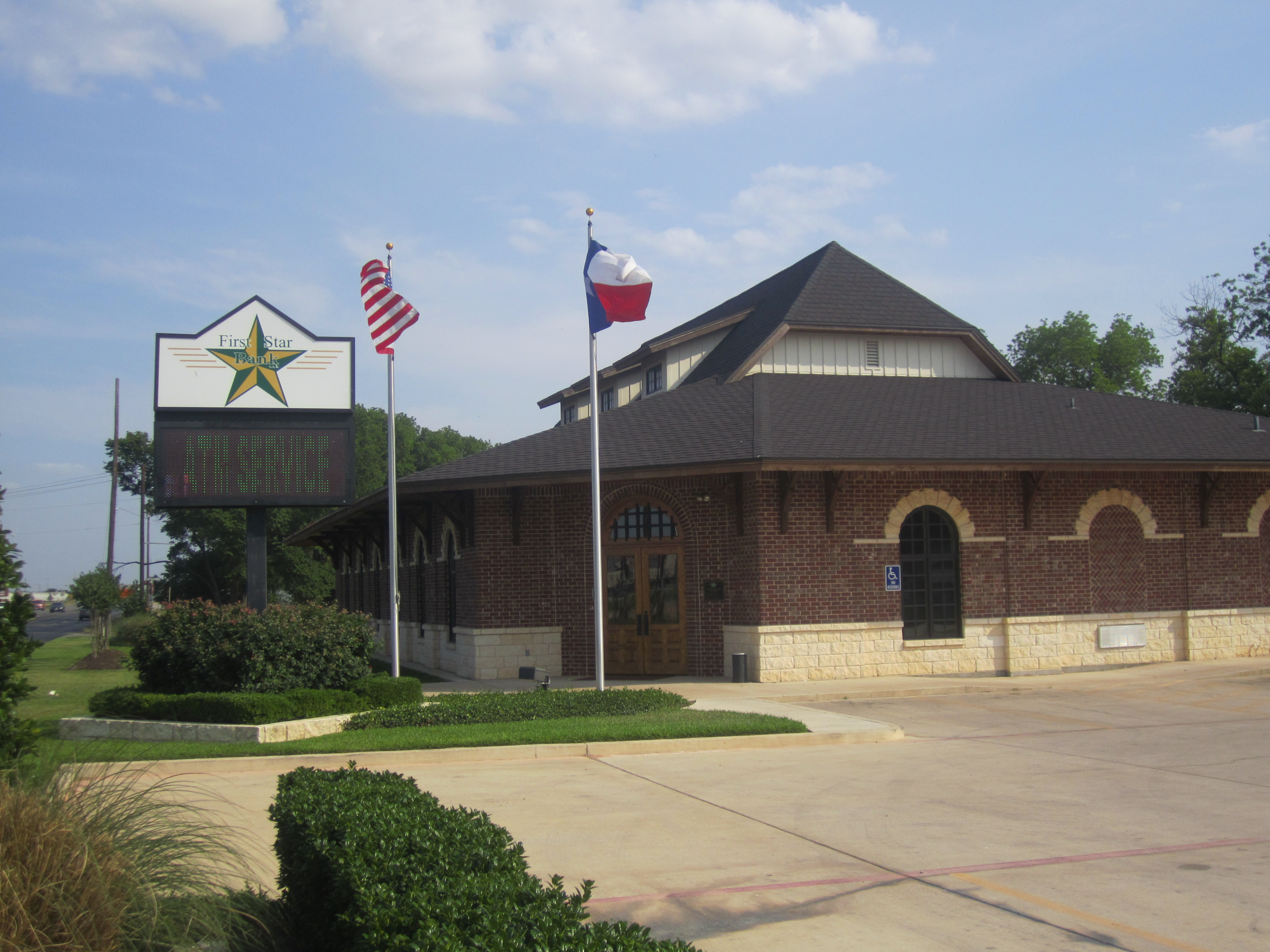
First Star Bank is located in Hearne off Texas State Highway 6 south.

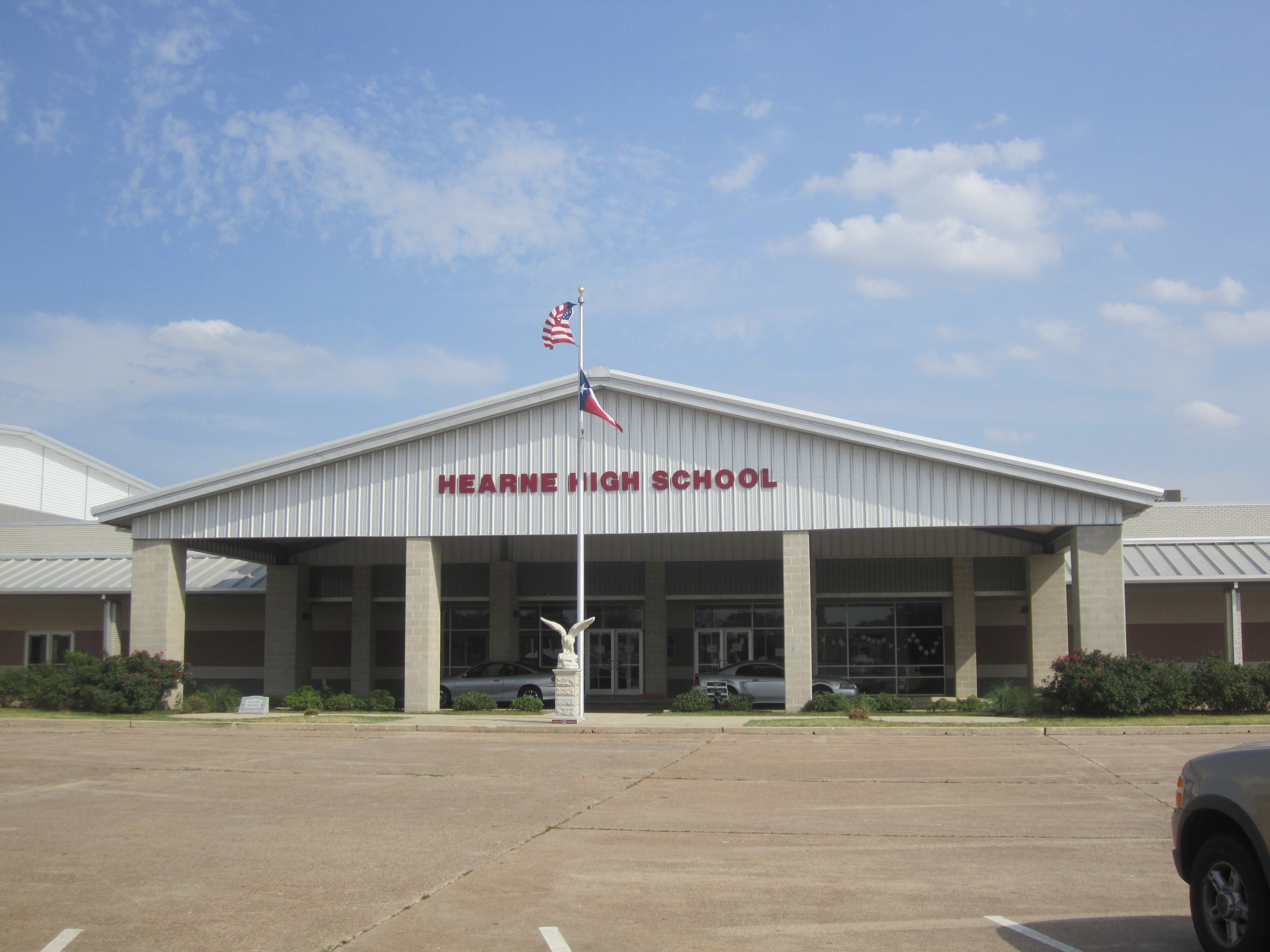
Hearne High School occupies the former Wal-Mart building.
