= Franklin, Texas =

- City
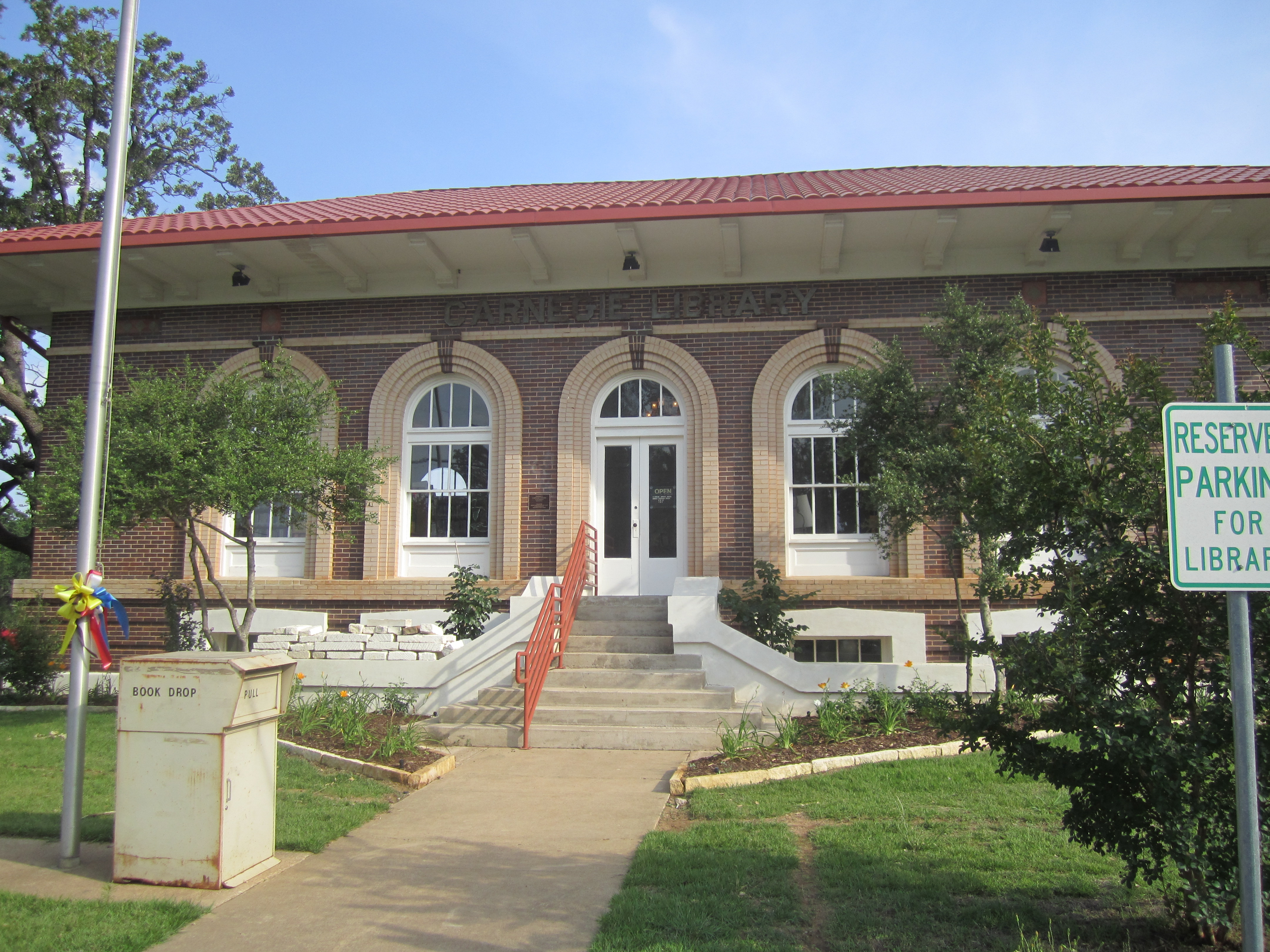
- Carnegie Library in Franklin (2011)

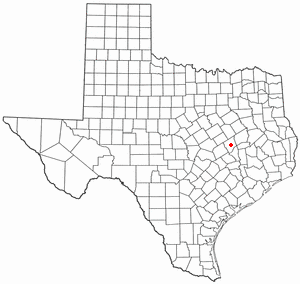
- Location of Franklin within Texas
- Coordinates: 31°01′24″N 96°29′08″W
- Country: United States
- State: Texas
- County: Robertson
- Founded: 1879

Area
  - Total: 1.17 sq mi (3.03 km^{2})
  - Land: 1.17 sq mi (3.03 km^{2})
  - Water: 0 sq mi (0.00 km^{2})
- Elevation: 443 ft (135 m)

Population (2020)
  - Total: 1,614
  - Density: 1,406.2/sq mi (542.92/km^{2})
- Time zone: UTC-6 (CST)
  - Summer (DST): UTC-5 (CDT)
- ZIP code: 77856
- Area code: 979
- FIPS code: 48-27288
- GNIS feature ID: 2410540
- Website: cityoffranklintx.com

Franklin is a city in, and the county seat of, Robertson County, Texas, United States. It is within the Brazos Valley, on the cusp of the East and Central Texas regions. As of the 2020 census, the city population was 1,614. The original name of the town was Morgan and it was made county seat in 1879.

== Geography ==
Franklin lies near the geographic center of the county, on an upland prairie that is drained by the branches of three creeks: Touchstone Branch, to the north, runs westward into Mud Creek; South Mineral Creek drains waters eastward to the Navasota River; and the forks of Cedar Creek run to the south, passing Mount Pleasant, Henry Prairie and Wheelock.

According to the United States Census Bureau, the city has a total area of 0.9 square miles (2.3 km^{2}), all land.

On April 13, 2019, an EF-3 tornado passed through Franklin, causing widespread damage and many injuries.

=== Climate ===
Climate data for Franklin, TX (1991-2020, coordinates:31.0328°N 96.4889°W)
Month	Jan	Feb	Mar	Apr	May	Jun	Jul	Aug	Sep	Oct	Nov	Dec	Year
Mean daily maximum °F (°C)	60.0 (15.6)	64.5 (18.1)	71.3 (21.8)	78.5 (25.8)	84.7 (29.3)	91.7 (33.2)	95.2 (35.1)	95.8 (35.4)	90.6 (32.6)	80.8 (27.1)	69.3 (20.7)	61.8 (16.6)	78.7 (25.9)
Daily mean °F (°C)	49.7 (9.8)	54.0 (12.2)	60.5 (15.8)	67.6 (19.8)	74.8 (23.8)	81.6 (27.6)	84.0 (28.9)	84.5 (29.2)	79.0 (26.1)	69.5 (20.8)	58.8 (14.9)	51.3 (10.7)	67.9 (20.0)
Mean daily minimum °F (°C)	39.4 (4.1)	43.5 (6.4)	49.6 (9.8)	56.8 (13.8)	65.0 (18.3)	71.4 (21.9)	72.8 (22.7)	73.1 (22.8)	67.5 (19.7)	58.1 (14.5)	48.3 (9.1)	40.9 (4.9)	57.2 (14.0)
Average precipitation inches (mm)	3.50 (89)	2.84 (72)	3.75 (95)	2.68 (68)	4.71 (120)	3.68 (93)	1.63 (41)	3.04 (77)	3.03 (77)	4.68 (119)	3.29 (84)	3.78 (96)	40.61 (1,031)
Average snowfall inches (cm)	0.3 (0.76)	0.3 (0.76)	0.0 (0.0)	0.0 (0.0)	0.0 (0.0)	0.0 (0.0)	0.0 (0.0)	0.0 (0.0)	0.0 (0.0)	0.0 (0.0)	0.0 (0.0)	0.0 (0.0)	0.6 (1.52)
Average precipitation days (≥ 0.01 in)	8.2	7.9	7.8	5.7	6.6	6.5	4.7	4.7	5.6	5.9	5.8	8.0	77.4
Average snowy days (≥ 0.01 in)	0	0.2	0	0	0	0	0	0	0	0	0	0	0.2
Source: NOAA

== Demographics ==
Historical population
Census	Pop.	Note	%±
1880	311		—
1890	665		113.8%
1920	1,131		—
1930	961		−15.0%
1940	1,087		13.1%
1950	1,209		11.2%
1960	1,065		−11.9%
1970	1,063		−0.2%
1980	1,349		26.9%
1990	1,336		−1.0%
2000	1,470		10.0%
2010	1,564		6.4%
2020	1,614		3.2%
U.S. Decennial Census

Franklin is part of the Bryan-College Station metropolitan area.

=== 2020 census ===
As of the 2020 census, Franklin had a population of 1,614, and the median age was 40.3 years.

23.9% of residents were under the age of 18 and 20.5% of residents were 65 years of age or older.

For every 100 females there were 100.5 males, and for every 100 females age 18 and over there were 88.2 males age 18 and over.

There were 604 households and 419 families residing in the city. Of those households, 36.6% had children under the age of 18 living in them, 44.9% were married-couple households, 17.9% were households with a male householder and no spouse or partner present, and 33.3% were households with a female householder and no spouse or partner present. About 28.3% of all households were made up of individuals and 12.1% had someone living alone who was 65 years of age or older.

There were 730 housing units, of which 17.3% were vacant. The homeowner vacancy rate was 0.8% and the rental vacancy rate was 16.0%.

0.0% of residents lived in urban areas, while 100.0% lived in rural areas.

Racial composition as of the 2020 census
Race	Number	Percent
White	1,107	68.6%
Black or African American	295	18.3%
American Indian and Alaska Native	3	0.2%
Asian	17	1.1%
Native Hawaiian and Other Pacific Islander	2	0.1%
Some other race	86	5.3%
Two or more races	104	6.4%
Hispanic or Latino (of any race)	199	12.3%

=== 2000 census ===
As of the 2000 census there were 1,470 people, 533 households, and 351 families living in the city. The population density was 1,594.4 inhabitants per square mile (615.6/km^{2}). There were 626 housing units at an average density of 679.0 per square mile (262.2/km^{2}). The racial makeup of the city was 75.51% White, 19.52% African American, 0.20% Native American, 0.41% Asian, 0.07% Pacific Islander, 2.93% from other races, and 1.36% from two or more races. Hispanic or Latino of any race were 8.84% of the population.

There were 533 households, out of which 36.8% had children under the age of 18 living with them, 44.5% were married couples living together, 17.8% had a female householder with no husband present, and 34.0% were non-families. 30.8% of all households were made up of individuals, and 18.2% had someone living alone who was 65 years of age or older. The average household size was 2.53 and the average family size was 3.20.

In the city, the population was spread out, with 29.0% under the age of 18, 6.9% from 18 to 24, 25.0% from 25 to 44, 18.4% from 45 to 64, and 20.6% who were 65 years of age or older. The median age was 37 years. For every 100 females, there were 85.4 males. For every 100 females age 18 and over, there were 80.6 males.

The median income for a household in the city was $27,400, and the median income for a family was $33,889. Males had a median income of $31,818 versus $20,441 for females. The per capita income for the city was $13,490. About 15.4% of families and 18.9% of the population were below the poverty line, including 23.5% of those under age 18 and 25.0% of those age 65 or over.

== Notable attractions ==
- Pridgeon Community Center and Visitor Center
- Robertson County Courthouse – National Register of Historic Places
- Franklin Ranch – Community/Sports Park
- Franklin Carnegie Library
- Franklin Cemetery

== Government ==
Franklin is a Type A general law city governed by a mayor and five city council members. The mayor and city council are elected at large to serve for a two-year term. Members may serve an unlimited number of terms. The city council meets on the third Monday of each month at 6:00 pm at City Hall. Request to be placed on the agenda should be made to the city secretary and approved by the mayor. All members must be residents within the city limits of Franklin.

== Education ==
Franklin is served by the Franklin Independent School District. The district website is located at Franklin ISD. It consists of three schools:

- Roland Reynolds Elementary: Pre-K–4th
- Franklin Middle School: 5th–8th
- Franklin High School: 9th–12th

The school district has approximately 1100 students and is classified as 3A according to the University Interscholastic League (UIL). Franklin High School has approximately 300–350 students.

== Notable people ==
- Fred C. Cole, librarian and historian
- Felix Nelson, actor
- Derek Scott Jr., racing driver

== Images ==
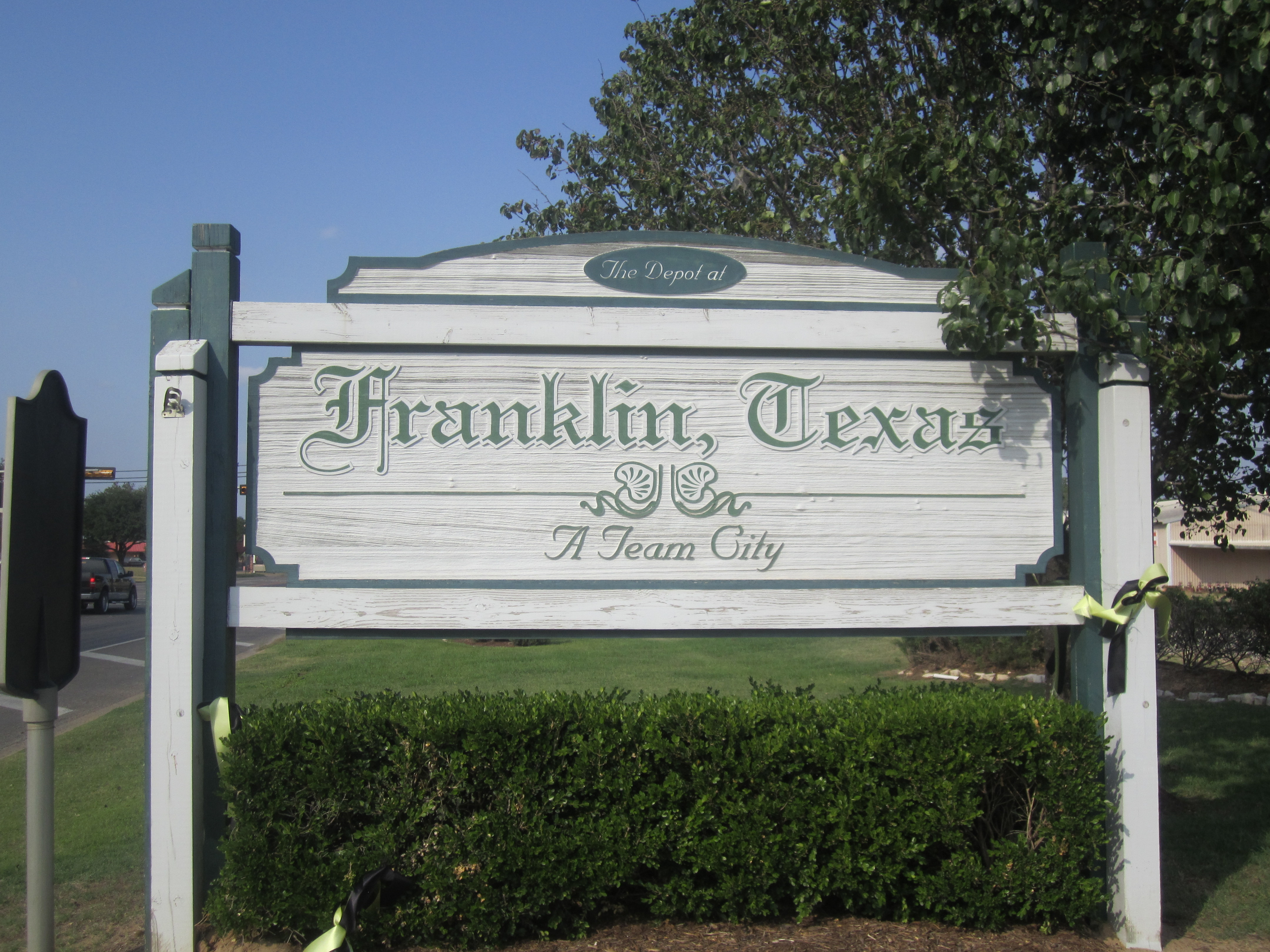

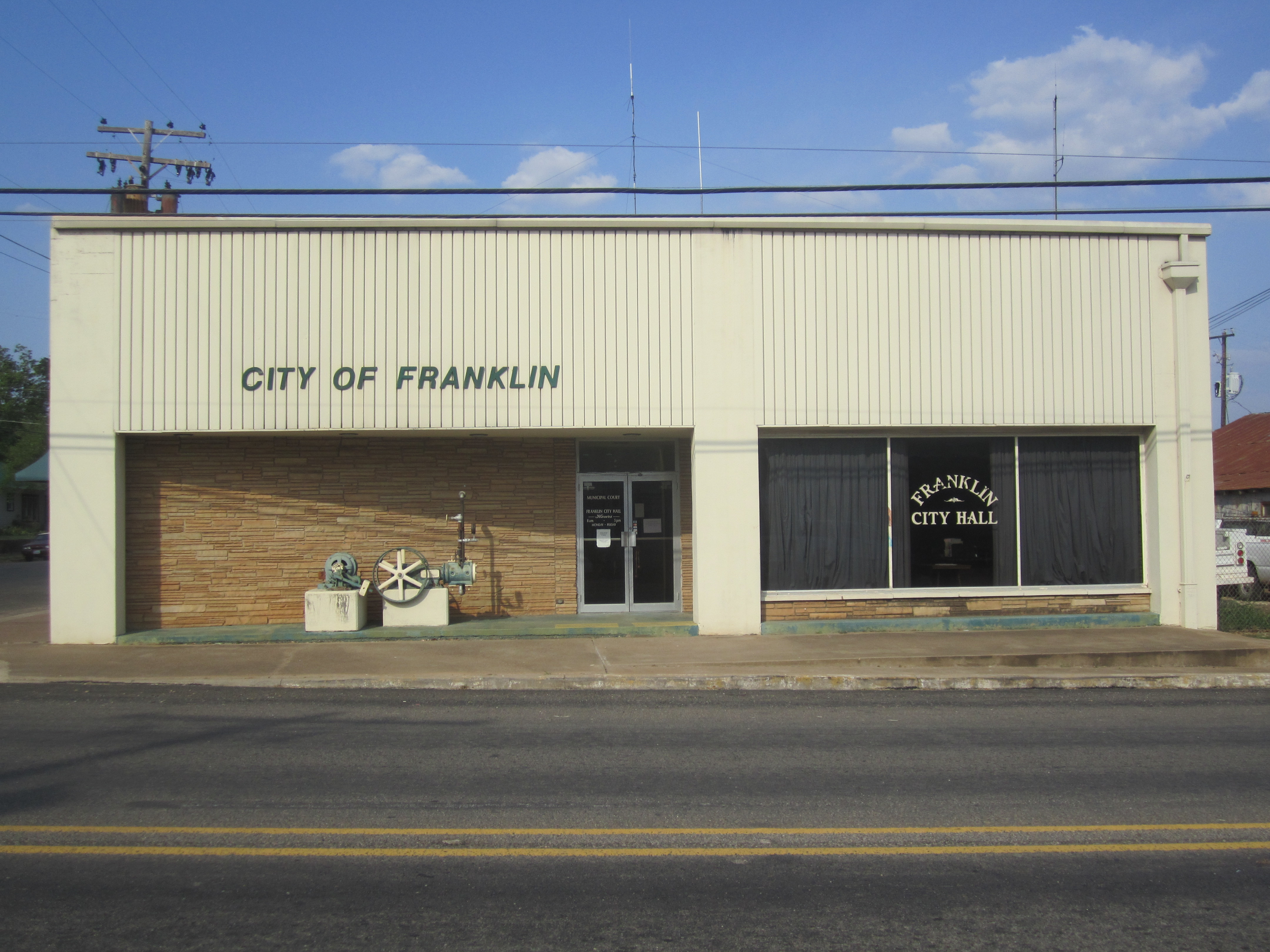
Franklin City Hall

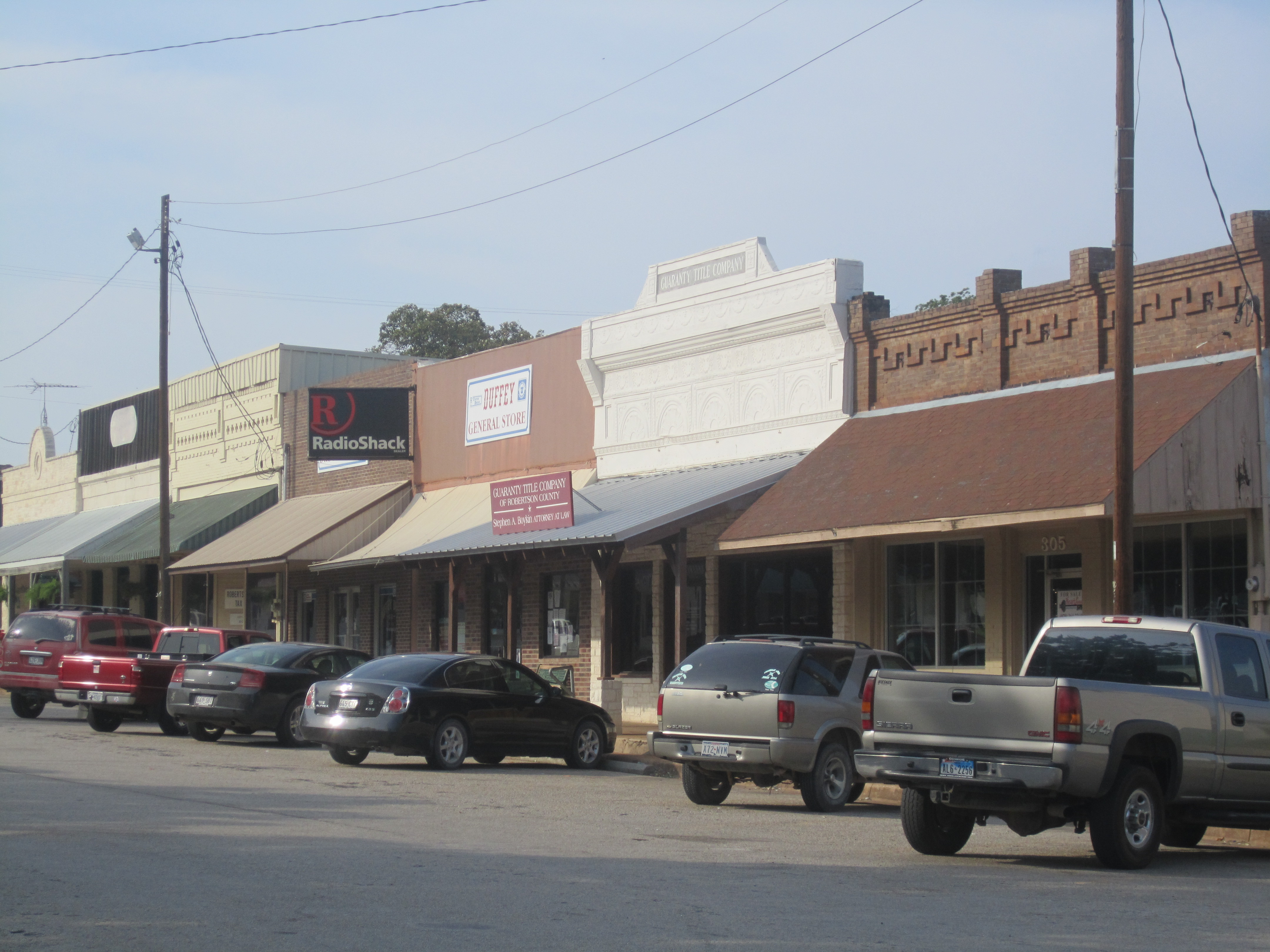
Part of downtown Franklin

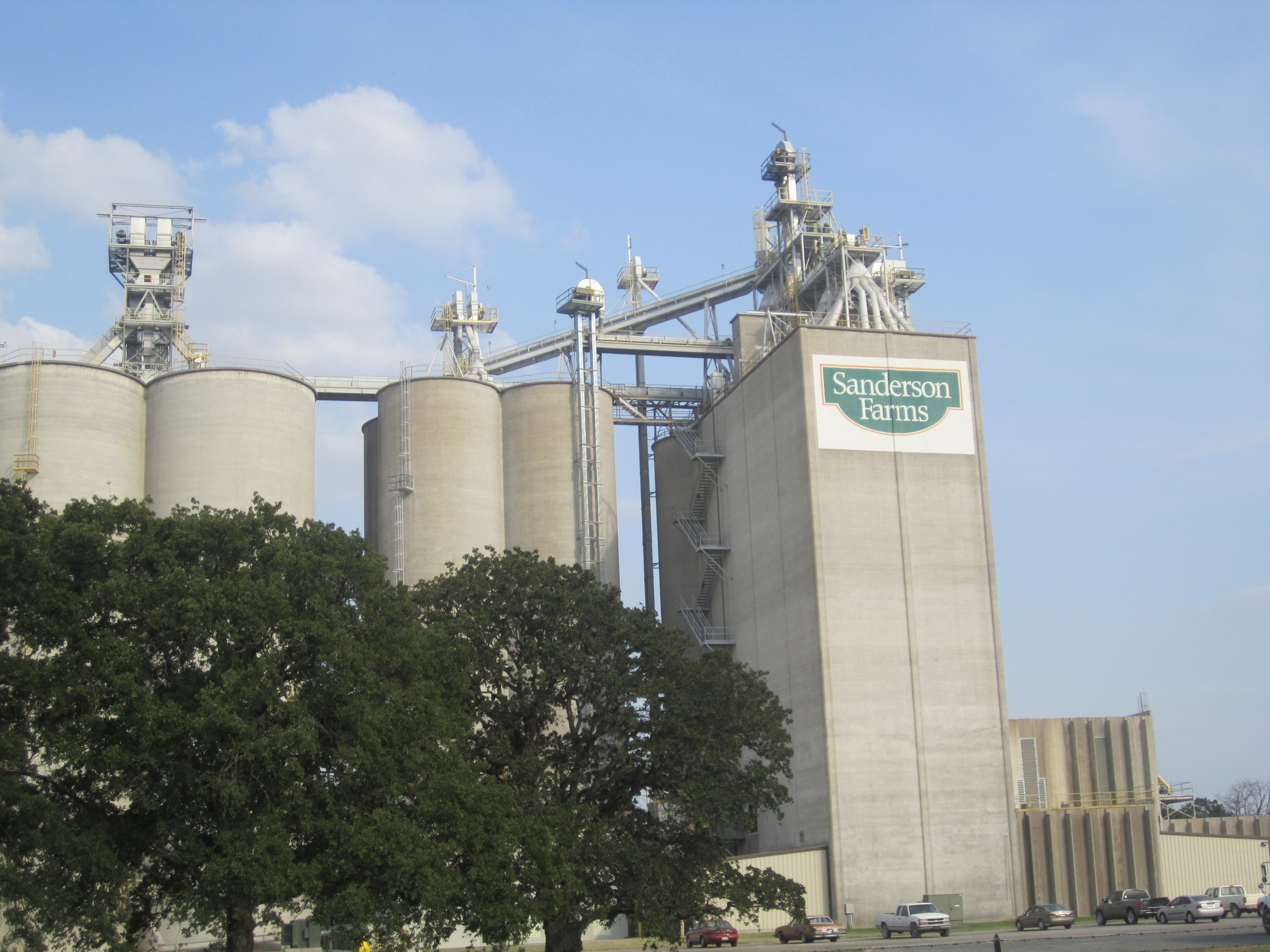
Sanderson Farms operation off U.S. Route 79 east of Franklin

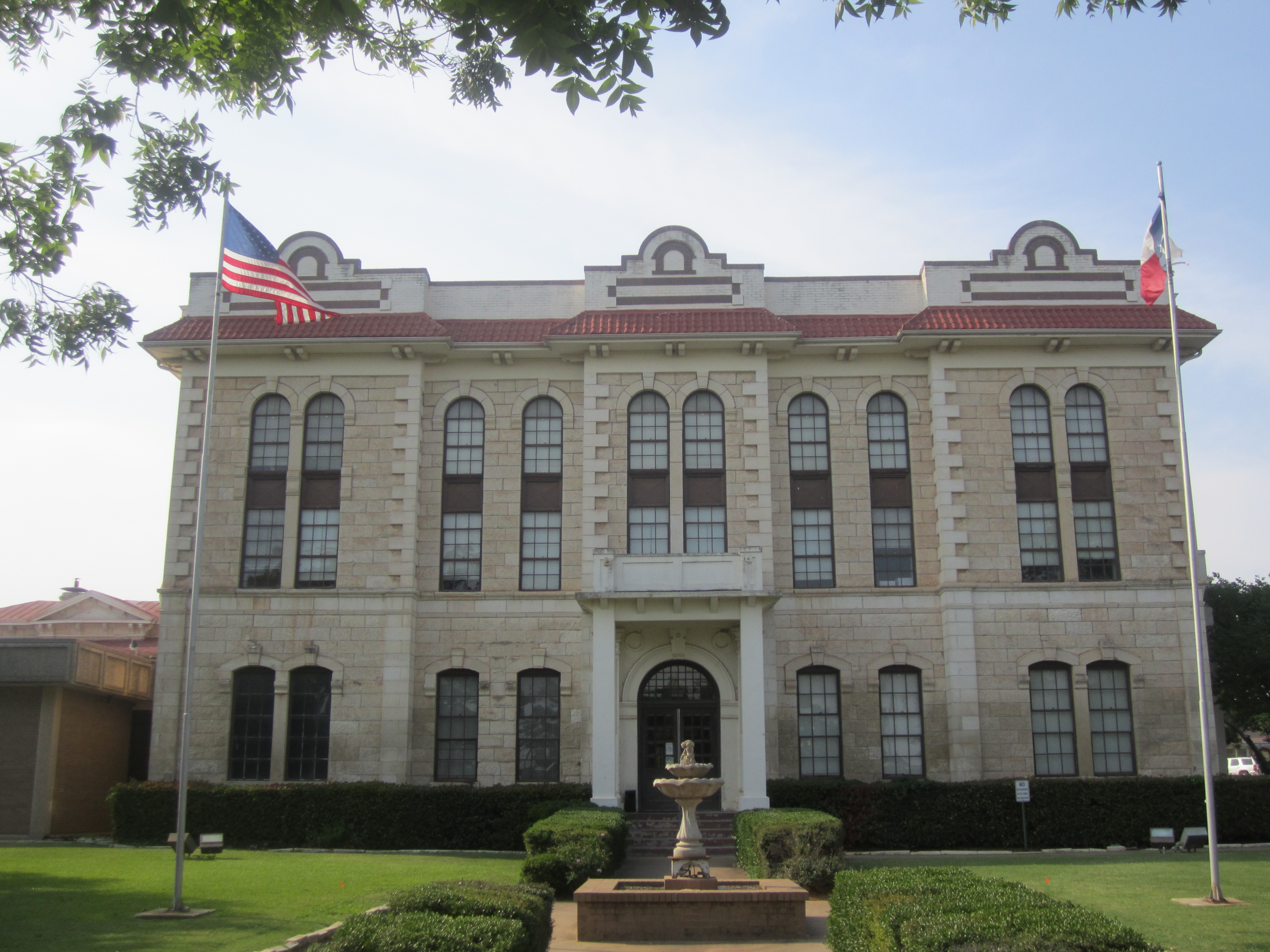
Robertson County Courthouse before renovation
