= Broadmoor High School =

Location
- 10100 Goodwood Blvd. Baton Rouge, Louisiana, 70815; United States; 30°26′32″N 91°4′32″W

Information
- Type: Public
- Motto: "Loyalty, Unity, Tradition"
- Established: 1960
- School district: East Baton Rouge Parish School System
- Principal: Robert Wells
- Staff: 53.28 (FTE)
- Grades: 9–12
- Enrollment: 903 (2023–2024)
- Student to teacher ratio: 16.95
- Colors: Columbia blue and scarlet
- Slogan: Bucs Are Best!
- Athletics: LHSAA 4A
- Mascot: Buccaneer
- Nickname: Bucs
- Yearbook: Buccaneer Log
- Website: ebrschools.org/schools/broadmoorhigh/

Broadmoor Senior High School (Broadmoor High School or BHS) is an accredited high school in Baton Rouge, Louisiana, United States. It is a part of the East Baton Rouge Parish School System.

== History ==
Broadmoor High School was founded in 1960 and resides on a 30-acre campus centrally located in the historic Broadmoor Neighborhood of south Baton Rouge. BHS offers an array of traditional and honors level courses, including several AP courses and College Dual Enrollment opportunities with Baton Rouge area colleges (BRCC, SU, LSU) for eligible upperclassmen in good academic standing. The school traditionally primarily serves students in the Broadmoor and Sherwood Forest subdivisions and within an eight-mile radius of the school.

The school originally served grades 7-11, with its first graduating class in 1962.

Broadmoor High School is home of the annual well-attended and highly publicized Broadmoor Arts & Crafts Festival held on campus every mid-November. At this event, people from across the country come to sell and buy various arts and foods. There are several venues facilitated by student organizations to raise funds for them. Overall, this event is a significant source of revenue for the school.

The most notable of the many student organizations on campus is the John Lay Chapter of the National Honor Society, the National Beta Club, the Student Government Association (SGA), the Presidents' Round Table, Denims-N-Diamonds (Choir), Broadmoor Band of Pride, Broadmoor Blade (School Newspaper), Buccaneer Log (Yearbook), FFA, and Broadmoor Young Life.

All students are required to wear uniforms which include a plain white or Columbia blue polo-style shirt with khakis.

In 2012, Broadmoor High School was given the Bronze Award by the U.S. News & World Report magazine, ranking them among the top high schools in the nation.

== Athletics ==
Broadmoor competes in the LHSAA 4A athletic class all home sporting events are held on campus (field and gym sports).

The athletic programs include:

- Boys Basketball (Varsity, JV, Freshmen)
- Football (Varsity, JV, Freshmen)
- Baseball (Varsity, JV)
- Girls Basketball (Varsity, JV)
- Volleyball (Varsity, JV)
- Boys and Girls Track & Field (Varsity, JV)
- Boys and Girls Bowling (Varsity)
- Boys Soccer (Varsity)
- Softball (Varsity)
- Boys and Girls Tennis (Varsity)
- Boys and Girls Cross Country (Varsity)
- Wrestling (Varsity)
- Coed Cheerleading (Varsity, JV)

=== Athletics history ===
Since 1969, Broadmoor's biggest rival has been the neighboring Tara High School Trojans. Prior to Tara's opening, Broadmoor's bigger rivals included Baton Rouge High, Catholic High and Istrouma High.

=== Championships ===
Football championships

- (1) State Championship: 1966

Boys' basketball championships

- (2) State Championships: 1985, 1987

=== Championship history ===
Broadmoor won its only state football title in 1966 as a 3A school defeating South Lafourche High School completing a 11-1-1 season under head coach Jerry Epperson.

Broadmoor also claims two 4A state basketball titles winning their first in 1985, defeating Monroe Carroll High School, 72-65. In 1987, the Buccaneers won their second title defeating New Orleans Carver High School, 72-56.

In addition to boys' basketball and football, the school holds state titles in golf, gymnastics, and cross country.

== Notable people ==
=== Alumni ===
- Larry S. Bankston, former state senator
- Billy Cannon Jr., former NFL Player
- John Davis, Millionaire CEO of BirchStreet Systems, Inc.
- Ledell Eackles, former NBA Player
- Dean Edward Johnson, attorney and TV personality
- Bucky Richardson, former NFL Player
- Ryan Theriot, MLB Player for the 2012 World Series Champions San Francisco Giants, the 2011 World Series Champions St. Louis Cardinals, and the NCAA 2000 College World Series Champions LSU Tigers

=== Faculty ===
Former State Representative and Louisiana Board of Regents member Vic Stelly taught and coached at Broadmoor during the 1960s.
