= Guy Brown =

American football player (born 1955)

No. 59
- Position: Linebacker

Personal information
- Born: June 1, 1955 (age 71); Palestine, Texas, U.S.
- Listed height: 6 ft 4 in (1.93 m)
- Listed weight: 223 lb (101 kg)

Career information
- High school: Palestine
- College: Houston
- NFL draft: 1977: 4th round, 108th overall pick

Career history
- Dallas Cowboys (1977–1982)

Awards and highlights
- Super Bowl champion (XII); Second-team All-SWC (1976)

Career NFL statistics
- Games played: 85
- Stats at Pro Football Reference

Guy Brown, III (born June 1, 1955) is an American former professional football player who was a linebacker in the National Football League (NFL) for the Dallas Cowboys. He played college football for the Houston Cougars.

== Early life ==
Brown attended Palestine High School. He only played one year of high school football, because his mother did not allow him to play before his senior season. He was a fullback and running back, on a team that finished with a 1-9 record.

He accepted a football scholarship from the University of Houston. As a freshman he played at tight end and defensive end. He was injured during most of his sophomore (knee) and junior (shoulder) seasons.

As a senior, he focused on playing the "standup" left defensive end position and contributed to the team winning the Southwest Conference championship.

== Professional career ==
Brown was selected by the Dallas Cowboys in the fourth round (108th overall) of the 1977 NFL draft, who saw him as an above average athlete and wanted to play him at outside linebacker. As a rookie, he was considered the fastest defensive player on the team and also set the rookie power clean lift record of 315 pounds.

In 1979, Brown was slowed by a groin injury. In 1980, he had a chance to earn the starting strongside linebacker job after Thomas "Hollywood" Henderson was waived, but was passed over by Mike Hegman. Hegman dislocated his elbow in the wild card playoff game against the Los Angeles Rams, which gave Brown a chance to start in the next two playoff games. He was one of the core special teams players during his first four seasons.

In 1981, Hegman fractured his arm in the season opener, giving Brown the chance to start six games at strongside linebacker.

In 1982, Brown would eventually earn the weakside linebacker full-time starter job, when D. D. Lewis retired.

After experiencing recurring neck problems and visiting with doctors, Brown was subsequently diagnosed with a narrow spinal column condition (cervical spinal stenosis), which forced him to announce his early retirement on July 11, 1983. He was replaced in the starting lineup by Anthony Dickerson.

== Personal life ==
Brown was the oldest son in a family of 10 siblings. He works in the fire protection industry and founded the company Guy Brown Fire & Safety, Inc. in 1982.

Brown was one of the plaintiffs in a class action lawsuit against the National Football League, alleging that it failed to adequately respond to the serious health risks posed by concussions and other repeated head traumas suffered during games.
