= Russ Cotton =

American football player (1915–2009)

No. 10
- Position: Quarterback

Personal information
- Born: May 24, 1915; Palestine, Texas, U.S.
- Died: February 7, 2009 (aged 94); Texas, U.S.
- Listed height: 6 ft 2 in (1.88 m)
- Listed weight: 196 lb (89 kg)

Career information
- High school: Palestine
- College: Texas State M&M (1937-1940)
- NFL draft: 1941: 13th round, 113th overall pick

Career history
- Brooklyn Dodgers (1941); Pittsburgh Steelers (1942)

Career NFL statistics
- Receptions: 2
- Receiving yards: 58
- Interceptions: 1
- Stats at Pro Football Reference

James Russell Cotton (May 24, 1915 – February 7, 2009) was an American professional football player who was a quarterback for one season with the Pittsburgh Steelers of the National Football League (NFL). He was selected in the 13th round of the 1941 NFL draft. He played college football at the College of Mines and Metallurgy of the University of Texas—now known as the University of Texas at El Paso (UTEP).
