= Billy Cannon Jr. =

American football player (born 1961)

No. 52
- Position: Linebacker

Personal information
- Born: October 8, 1961 (age 65); Baton Rouge, Louisiana, U.S.
- Listed height: 6 ft 4 in (1.93 m)
- Listed weight: 231 lb (105 kg)

Career information
- High school: Broadmoor (Baton Rouge)
- College: Texas A&M
- NFL draft: 1984: 1st round, 25th overall pick

Career history
- Dallas Cowboys (1984)

Career NFL statistics
- Games played: 8
- Stats at Pro Football Reference

William Abb Cannon Jr. (born October 8, 1961) is an American former professional football player who was a linebacker for the Dallas Cowboys of the National Football League (NFL). He played college football for the Texas A&M Aggies.

== Early life ==
Cannon attended Broadmoor High School where he lettered in four sports. In baseball, he played shortstop and was a two-time All-State and an All-American selection. In football he played quarterback, running back, safety, special teams and even kicked a few times. In his senior year, he received All-State and All-American honors, while helping his team to an undefeated regular season.

On Halloween night in 1979, he returned a punt against Istrouma (his father's alma mater) 89 yards for a touchdown and a 20–18 win, exactly 20 years after his father had his famous 89 yard punt return for Louisiana State University to beat Ole Miss 7–3.

As an 18-year-old senior with ability and a marquee name, he was a probable first-round draft choice in the 1980 Major League Baseball draft as a shortstop/outfielder. His father had previously sent telegrams to all major league teams advising not to invest a draft selection on his son, because he was going to attend college. After the New York Yankees drafted him in the third round, teams filed grievances citing that they were misled by the telegrams, while there were secret meetings with the Yankees to negotiate a contract agreement. Then baseball commissioner Bowie Kuhn vetoed the contract, forfeited the Yankees draft pick and called for a special draft to be held for his rights. The Cleveland Indians selected Cannon in the special draft.

== College career ==
After the Yankees selection was voided, he committed to Texas A&M University to the dismay of LSU fans. As a freshman, he started 6 games as a flanker, making 11 receptions for 118 yards (fourth on the team). He ranked second in the conference in kickoff returns with a 20.8-yard average.

As a sophomore, he was moved to free safety and led the secondary with 58 tackles.

As a junior, he played at strong safety, while registering 64 tackles (fifth on the team). He finished third in the conference in punt returns with a 9-yard average on 31 returns.

As a senior, he was switched to outside linebacker, but even then as a key member of the defense, he still returned kicks and punts. He posted 60 tackles (seventh on the team), 4 sacks and 3 fumble recoveries. He finished his college career with 86 punt returns for a 7.6-yard average, one punt return touchdown and 22 kickoff returns for a 21.1-yard average.

He also was a starter in the outfield for the baseball team. He was drafted by the Los Angeles Dodgers.

== Professional career ==
Cannon was selected by the Dallas Cowboys in the first round (25th overall) of the 1984 NFL draft, becoming the first player from Texas A&M University drafted by the Cowboys. It was reported that the Washington Redskins also had him as their desired selection in the round. He was also selected by the San Antonio Gunslingers in the 1984 USFL Territorial Draft.

Eight games into his rookie season, he was a reserve right outside linebacker alternating with Anthony Dickerson, when an existing congenital spinal condition was complicated after he tackled New Orleans Saints running back Wayne Wilson. He was knocked unconscious, suffered damage to two vertebrae near his neck and experienced a brief paralysis of his arms and legs. He never started and appeared in just eight games before this injury forced him to retire in order to avoid risking paralysis.

== Personal life ==
Cannon filed a multimillion-dollar lawsuit claiming negligence by the Cowboys, after he informed them of experiencing numbness in his upper body when making tackles. The team denied ever receiving such claims but settled in 1992.

His father, Billy Cannon, was a Heisman Trophy winner who played in the American Football League.
