= Roomkey =

Metasearch engine

- Website type: Privately held company
- Founded: 2012; 14 years ago
- Dissolved: June 2020
- Headquarters: Dallas, Texas
- Owners: InterContinental Hotels Group; Hilton Worldwide; Hyatt; Marriott International; Choice Hotels; Wyndham Worldwide
- Founder: John Davis
- Key people: Steve Sickel, CEO
- Industry: Hospitality
- Services: Hotel Reservation metasearch engine
- Website: www.roomkey.com

Roomkey, formerly Room Key, was a hotel metasearch engine. Roomkey was a joint venture founded by Choice Hotels International, Hilton Worldwide, Hyatt Hotels Corporation, InterContinental Hotels Group, Marriott International, and Wyndham Worldwide, or their respective affiliates. There were over 45,000 hotels in 150 countries listed on Room Key, including 60 brands.

The company was headquartered in Dallas, Texas. Its interim CEO was Steve Sickel.

== History ==
Room Key was the successor of the website Travelweb (acquired by Booking Holdings).

In 2011, Room Key acquired hotelicopter, a Charlottesville, VA-based firm, and its technology platform, which provided the technology foundation for Roomkey.com.

Room Key launched its beta site and added Best Western International as its first commercial partner in January 2012. In March 2012, Room Key launched international websites in the United Kingdom, Canada, Australia, and New Zealand. That same month, Room Key added Preferred Hotel Group as a commercial partner, following with Worldhotels in April.

Room Key exited beta and fully launched in May 2012. Best Western joined Roomkey a few days after it launched.

In September 2012, Room Key added La Quinta Inns & Suites, Millennium & Copthorne Hotels, and Leading Hotels of the World as commercial partners. Carlson Rezidor Hotel Group was added as a commercial partner in November 2012.

In 2014, Davis stepped down as CEO of Room Key. Steve Sickel was named interim CEO.

In 2015, Accor CEO Sebastian Bazin mimicked a "pschitt" noise to describe Room Key. In 2016, David Kong, CEO of Best Western, called Roomkey a "big disappointment".

On June 8, 2020, the company announced via email and social media that it would no longer be providing hotel search functionality and that all user data would be deleted, effective immediately. The message read, in part: "At Roomkey, our goal has always been honesty. The truth is that Roomkey is in the process of redefining our business operations. Starting June 8, Roomkey.com will no longer provide hotel search services." It was unclear at the time if the company was ceasing all operations permanently or planning to relaunch with a new product in the future.

== Operations ==
Roomkey was owned by its founding partners: Choice Hotels International, Hilton Worldwide, Hyatt Hotels Corporation, InterContinental Hotels Group, Marriott International, and Wyndham Worldwide. Along with its founding partners’ properties, Roomkey’s website included properties from commercial partners. Commercial partners do not have an ownership stake in Roomkey. Roomkey also had partnerships with several central reservation systems (CRS), including Sabre SynXis, Trust, and TravelClick, which enable the listing of thousands of additional hotels on Roomkey’s website.

When a Roomkey user attempted to book a room with any of Roomkey’s founding or commercial partners, the customer was directed to the partner’s site and booked a room directly with the hotel.
