= John Gold =

American football player (born 1988)

No. 1
- Position: Punter

Personal information
- Born: March 22, 1988 (age 38); Galveston, Texas, U.S.
- Listed height: 6 ft 2 in (1.88 m)
- Listed weight: 204 lb (93 kg)

Career information
- High school: Palestine (Palestine, Texas)
- College: Texas (2006–2010)
- NFL draft: 2011: undrafted

Career history
- Seattle Seahawks (2011)*
- * Offseason or practice squad member only
- Stats at Pro Football Reference

John Gold (born March 22, 1988) is an American former football punter. He was signed by the Seahawks as an undrafted free agent in 2011. He played college football at the University of Texas.

He is currently co-owner of Forty Acres Coffee, along with former University of Texas center Chris Hall.

== Professional career ==
Gold was signed by the Seattle Seahawks as an undrafted free agent in July 2011, following the end of the NFL lockout. He was cut on September 1, 2011.
