= Anthony Dickerson =

American gridiron football player (1957–2019)

No. 51, 58
- Position: Outside linebacker

Personal information
- Born: June 9, 1957; Texas City, Texas, U.S.
- Died: March 21, 2019 (aged 61)
- Listed height: 6 ft 2 in (1.88 m)
- Listed weight: 220 lb (100 kg)

Career information
- High school: Pearland (Pearland, Texas)
- College: Southern Methodist
- NFL draft: 1980: undrafted

Career history
- Toronto Argonauts (1978)*; Calgary Stampeders (1978); Dallas Cowboys (1980–1984); Buffalo Bills (1985); Miami Dolphins (1986)*
- * Offseason or practice squad member only

Career NFL statistics
- Games played: 89
- Sacks: 15
- Interceptions: 5
- Fumble recoveries: 7
- Stats at Pro Football Reference

Anthony Charles Dickerson (June 9, 1957 – March 21, 2019) was an American professional football linebacker in the National Football League (NFL) for the Dallas Cowboys and Buffalo Bills. He played college football at Southern Methodist University.

== Early life ==
Dickerson's family moved to Pearland in 1957, but it was not until after integration that he attended Pearland schools. Before the third grade he attended Ralph A Bunch in Manvel, Texas. At Pearland (TX), he was a three-year starter at running back and also played linebacker. He received All-American honors as a senior.

He began his college career at Henderson County Junior College, where he was a Junior College All-American and an All-conference linebacker in 1976.

In 1977, Dickerson transferred to Southern Methodist University where he was named co-captain and a starter at linebacker, finishing with 136 tackles (62 solo), one safety, one caused fumble, and one blocked kick. He also had a game against Ohio State University where he recorded 32 tackles. In 1978, he was let go by head coach Ron Meyer. Meyer was quoted as saying "I haven't been around that long, but Dickerson was the greatest linebacker I have ever coached".

On October 1, 2011, he was inducted into the Trinity Valley Community College Cardinal Hall of Fame.

== Professional career ==
=== Toronto Argonauts ===
In 1978, he signed with the Toronto Argonauts of the Canadian Football League. He was waived on October 3.

=== Calgary Stampeders ===
In 1978, he signed with the Calgary Stampeders of the Canadian Football League and played in 10 games before being released.

=== Dallas Cowboys ===
After being cut by the Calgary Stampeders, he moved to Los Angeles and got a job as a maintenance department stock clerk at the Burbank Airport. In 1979, he returned to Texas and was taking business courses at the University of Houston, when the Dallas Cowboys signed him as an undrafted free agent in 1980. He made the team because he was one of the fastest linebackers in the NFL.

As a rookie, he contributed on special teams and in the nickel defense, replacing weakside linebacker D. D. Lewis on passing downs. He posted 41 tackles, 2 interceptions, 6 passes defensed, 3 forced fumbles (tied for the team lead), one sack and one fumble recovery. He was named the Cowboys special teams player of the year. He had 2 interceptions against the San Francisco 49ers and caused 2 fumbles on special teams against the Seattle Seahawks, that led to 2 touchdowns. In the playoffs, he recovered a fumble against the Atlanta Falcons that set up the Cowboys' first touchdown and he intercepted a pass against the Philadelphia Eagles in the NFC title game.

In 1981, he was named special teams captain and repeated as the Cowboys special teams player of the year. He also played on the nickel defense, registering 39 tackles, 4 sacks and 2 fumble recoveries. His first half fumble recovery was a key play in the team's division title clinching 21–10 win over the Philadelphia Eagles.

In 1982, he remained a regular player on passing downs because of his ability to cover running backs, tallying 33 tackles, 2.5 sacks and one interception.

In 1983, he was named the starter at weakside linebacker after Guy Brown retired. He finished with 114 tackles (second on the team), 81 solo tackles (led the team), 6 passes defensed, 2 forced fumbles, 3 fumble recoveries, one interception and 10.5 sacks (second on the team), the most ever by a linebacker in franchise history (it was broken by DeMarcus Ware in 2006). Against the Oakland Raiders, he tallied 11 tackles, 2 sacks, 2 forced fumbles and one fumble recovery. Against the New Orleans Saints, he sacked Ken Stabler for a safety with 1:58 minutes remaining to give Dallas a 21–20 win. His pressure on Scott Brunner caused Dextor Clinkscale's interception for the decisive touchdown in a 28–13 win over the New York Giants.

Dickerson entered the 1984 season as a rising star, but the team decided to alternate him with first round draft choice Billy Cannon Jr. He also was limited in the preseason with a shoulder injury. His production would drop to 72 tackles, 2 sacks, one interception and one fumble recovery. Against the Green Bay Packers, he intercepted a pass in the last two minutes to set up a Cowboys touchdown in a 20–6 win. Against the Indianapolis Colts, he recovered a fumble on the eight-yard line to prevent a touchdown in a 22–3 win.

On September 2, 1985, he was traded to the Buffalo Bills in exchange for a seventh-round draft selection in the 1986 NFL draft.

=== Buffalo Bills ===
In 1985, he played mainly on special teams and did not start any games. He was released on August 11, 1986.

=== Miami Dolphins ===
On August 14, 1985, he signed as a free agent with the Miami Dolphins, who were having health problems with their outside linebackers. He was cut on August 19.
