= John Davis (entrepreneur) =

American entrepreneur (born 1953)

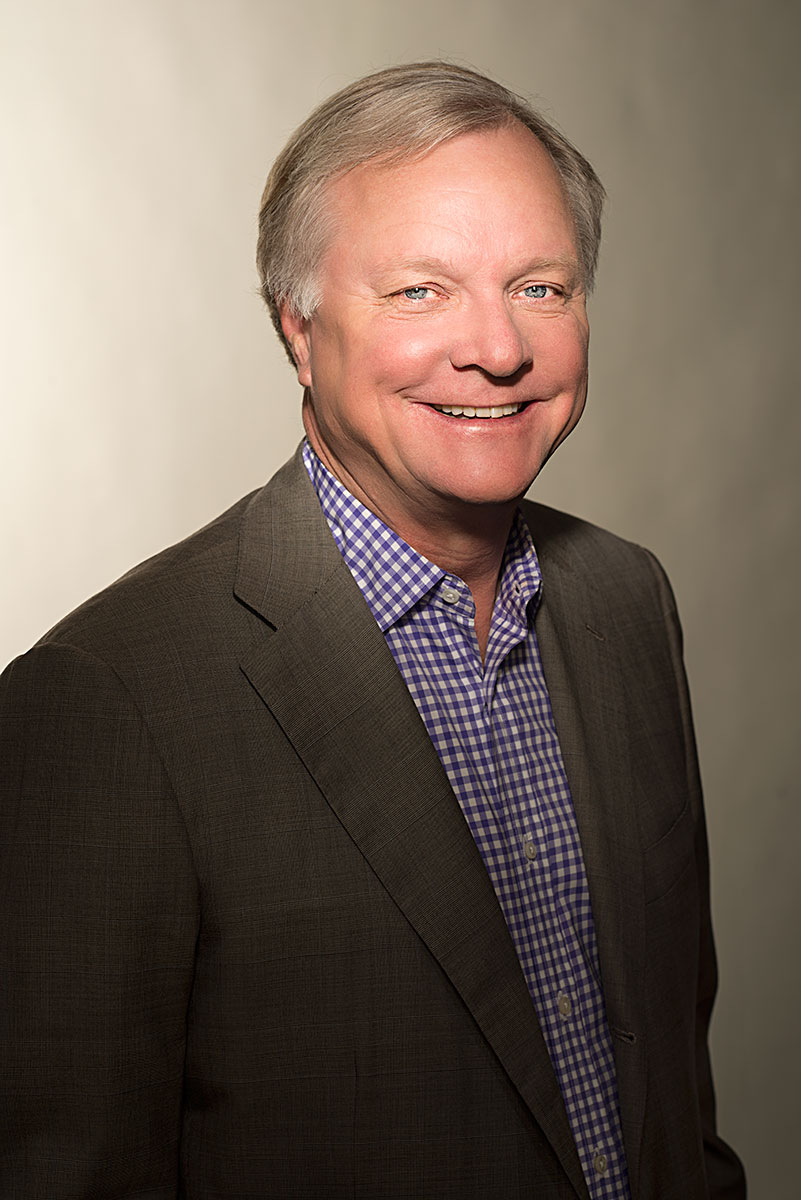
- Born: John F. Davis III; 1953
- Died: 2025
- Other names: John F. Davis, John Davis III
- Education: Texas Christian University
- Occupation: Businessman
- Known for: Former chairman and CEO of Pegasus Solutions Inc.; Founder of 1800-FLOWERS; Founder of RoomKey
- Board member of: TRX Inc, Texas Christian University

John F. Davis III (born 1953) was a billionaire entrepreneur, educator, and a member of the Texas Christian University Board of Trustees. He is a co-founder of 1-800-Flowers and a former CEO of Pegasus Solutions, Birch Street Systems and Room Key.

== Early life ==
Davis was born in Baton Rouge, Louisiana, where he attended Broadmoor High School. He is the oldest of five siblings. Davis graduated from Texas Christian University in Fort Worth, Texas with a bachelor's in business administration. Following his graduation, Davis briefly became involved in politics, serving as U.S. Senator John Tower's campaign director during Tower's successful 1978 reelection bid. Following his work on Tower's campaign, Davis ran for a seat in the Texas House of Representatives and lost a close race.

== Career ==
Davis' business career began in 1978, when he became president of Mid-South Drilling Co. In 1982, he co-founded 1-800-FLOWERS, then a toll-free phone ordering system for the floral industry, with business partner Jim Poage. He sold his stake in the company to James McCann in 1984.

Davis founded a telemarketing company, ATC Communications, in 1984. By the time he sold the business in 1989, ATC Communications had 1,200 employees.

=== Pegasus Solutions (1989–2008) ===
In 1989, Davis was hired as president and CEO of the Hotel Switch Company (THISCO), which was a consortium of fifteen major hotel chains. At THISCO, Davis created a computer switch that linked the individual chains’ reservations with airline Global Distribution Systems. His Pegasus Electronic Distribution Switch technology launched in 1989 and he began selling the technology to hotel chains outside of the consortium.

In 1992, Davis led the formation of Hotel Clearing Corporation. In 1994, Davis led the launch of TravelWeb, then an online travel and hotel catalogue. In 1996, TravelWeb became the first website that allowed users to book hotel and airline reservations online.

THISCO and the Hotel Clearing Corporation were combined to form Pegasus Systems, Inc. in 1996. Davis was retained as president and CEO of Pegasus. In 1999, Hotel Clearing Corporation was renamed Pegasus Commission Processing and THISCO renamed Pegasus Electronic Distribution.

Davis led Pegasus' acquisition of REZsolutions, a hotel marketing and reservation provider in 2000. In 2006, Prides Capital acquired Pegasus solutions for $275 million. Davis retired from Pegasus in July 2008.

=== Birch Street Systems (2008–2010) ===
In November 2008, Davis became CEO of Birch Street Systems, an e-procurement and back office automation solutions provider. He left Birch Street in 2010.

=== Room Key ===
Davis was the founding CEO of Room Key until September 2014, a startup hotel metasearch engine. Room Key launched in January 2012 and is owned by Choices Hotels International, Hilton Worldwide, Hyatt Hotels Corporation, InterContinental Hotels Group, Marriott International, and Wyndham Worldwide or their respective affiliates.

== Other activities ==
Davis had served as executive-in-residence at the Neeley School of Business at Texas Christian University since 2008. He is also a member of Texas Christian University's board of trustees.

He sat on the board of Birch Street and has served on TRX Inc.'s board of directors since 2000. Davis was appointed Honorary Consul of the Principality of Monaco in Dallas by Prince Rainier III on June 24, 2003.

== See also ==
- Travel technology
