= Dean Edward Johnson =

American attorney, TV personality and academic

Dean Johnson
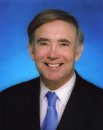
- Born: Dean Edward Johnson; July 15, 1950 (age 75); Atlanta, Georgia
- Education: B.A., Yale University M.A and M. Philosophy, Columbia University J.D., New York University School of Law
- Occupations: Attorney, TV Personality, Academician

Dean Johnson (born July 15, 1950) is an American attorney, television personality and academic.

== Background ==
Johnson was born in Atlanta, Georgia. He graduated first in his class from Broadmoor High School in Baton Rouge, Louisiana. He earned a National Merit Scholarship to Yale University and graduated from Yale in 1972 with a Bachelor of Arts in Mathematics and Philosophy. He earned the Master of Arts and Master of Philosophy degrees from Columbia University where he was a National Science Foundation Fellow and Faculty Fellow. He was awarded a Root-Tilden Fellowship to the New York University School of Law. He earned his J.D. degree from NYU 1980.

Johnson practices law in California. He is a former San Mateo County, California homicide prosecutor. He is now in private practice. Johnson is also the Legal Analyst for ABC-7 News in San Francisco and a permanent member of the adjunct faculty of School of Business and Management of Notre Dame DeNamur University in Belmont, California.

== Media ==
Johnson first became known as a TV personality when he was asked to comment on the Scott Peterson murder case. During the Peterson case, Johnson was a regular guest on MSNBC, CNN's American Morning and Fox's Big Story. Johnson is currently the legal analyst for ABC-7 News in San Francisco, California. He has commented on national legal affairs including Supreme Court nominations, same sex marriage, warrantless wiretaps, the death penalty, abortion and the legalization of marijuana. Johnson has covered a number of high-profile cases, including the Scott Peterson trial, the Michael Jackson trial, the Martha Stewart trial and the Barry Bonds case, the Rush Limbaugh case, the Kobe Bryant case, the Proposition 8 ("Same Sex Marriage") trial and appeal, the Hewlett-Packard Criminal investigation, and the iPhone theft investigation. Johnson is a frequent guest on radio and on network TV. His comments on legal affairs have also appeared in The New York Times, The Wall Street Journal, the San Francisco Chronicle, the San Jose Mercury News, The Baltimore Sun, and People magazine.

== Academia ==
Johnson currently teaches at Notre Dame DeNamur University in Belmont, California, where he is a lecturer and permanent member of the adjunct faculty of the Graduate School of Business and Management. Johnson teaches a popular course entitled Game Theory, Negotiation and Strategic Decision Making. The course is an outgrowth of Johnson's lifelong study of the science of game theory and decision making. Johnson first became interested in game theory as an undergraduate student in mathematics at Yale. Heavily influenced by Mancur Olson's The Logic of Collective Action, he began to apply game theory in the study of political science during his graduate studies at Columbia. Later, as a practicing lawyer, Johnson began using game theory to analyze litigation and negotiation strategy. Johnson's teaching and academic work focuses on the application of game theory and, more recently, behavioral economics in the analysis of negotiations and strategic decisions generally. Johnson's study of negotiation and decision making suggests that current theories under-emphasized role of persuasion in obtaining optimal, stable outcomes. As a result, Johnson has developed his own approach negotiation, sometimes called the Advocacy Theory of Negotiation.

== Law practice ==
Johnson maintains a private practice in Redwood City, California. His practice includes criminal defense as well as civil litigation. Johnson recently defended one of the largest criminal cases to arise out of the sub-prime mortgage crisis, obtaining a settlement of nine separate felony prosecutions in exchange for a short jail sentence and electronic home monitoring for his client. One judge called the case "unique in the history of California jurisprudence." The case was the subject of a front page feature article in The Wall Street Journal. Representing a high school student in a child pornography trial, Johnson recently obtained a judgment of acquittal before the jury was selected. Johnson also obtained a dismissal for a young man from Lebanon who was accused of sexual assault. Johnson's client, who was planning to marry his American fiancée, had been facing six years in State Prison followed by deportation back to the Middle East. Johnson was a prosecutor in the San Mateo County District Attorney's Office for 15 years. He prosecuted white collar crime as a member of the Consumer Fraud Unit. He was the County's top narcotics prosecutor for three years during which his cases included the trial of the County's first meth lab case, and a prosecution of a member of the Colombian Drug Cartel. He became a homicide prosecutor when one City in San Mateo County - East Palo Alto- was known as the "homicide capital of America" and often tried back-to-back homicide trials.

== Personal life ==
Johnson is a martial artist, mountaineer and stand-up comedian. Johnson began climbing in Yosemite National Park in the 1980s. By 1994, he had summited several of the highest mountains in South America, including Aconcagua. In 1994, he was invited to join an American Expedition to Mount Everest. Johnson began studying the martial arts at the age of 4. He holds the black belt, or equivalent, in four martial arts. He was awarded the black belt in Japanese Ju-Jitsu by combat. He is one of the few persons outside Thailand to be licensed as an instructor in art of Muay Thai. Currently, Johnson practices Gracie Jiu-Jitsu and is a personal student of Charles Gracie. Johnson is a graduate of the San Francisco Comedy College and has performed at the San Jose Improv and other venues in the San Francisco Bay Area. Johnson lives in Redwood City, California with his wife, criminal defense attorney Linda Bramy and their two German Shepherds, Linnloch's Prince Charming aka "Jake" and Linnloch's Fire and Ice, PT, HT aka "DeeDee."
