= Adrian Peterson =

American football player (born 1985)

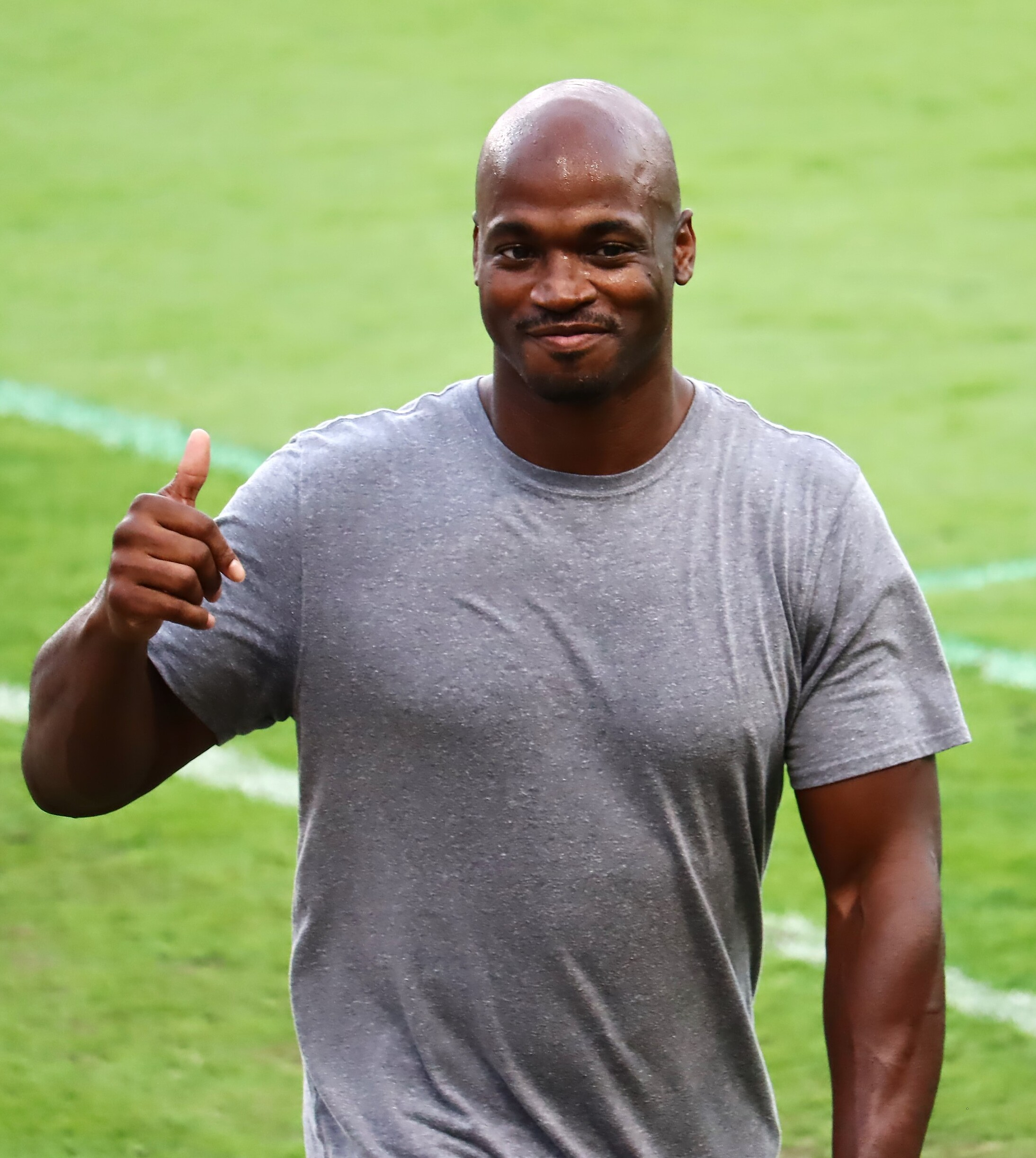
- Peterson in 2026

No. 28, 23, 26, 8, 21
- Position: Running back

Personal information
- Born: March 21, 1985 (age 41); Palestine, Texas, U.S.
- Listed height: 6 ft 1 in (1.85 m)
- Listed weight: 220 lb (100 kg)

Career information
- High school: Palestine
- College: Oklahoma (2004–2006)
- NFL draft: 2007: 1st round, 7th overall pick

Career history
- Minnesota Vikings (2007–2016); New Orleans Saints (2017); Arizona Cardinals (2017); Washington Redskins (2018–2019); Detroit Lions (2020); Tennessee Titans (2021); Seattle Seahawks (2021)

Awards and highlights
- NFL Most Valuable Player (2012); NFL Offensive Player of the Year (2012); NFL Offensive Rookie of the Year (2007); 4× First-team All-Pro (2008, 2009, 2012, 2015); 3× Second-team All-Pro (2007, 2010, 2013); 7× Pro Bowl (2007–2010, 2012, 2013, 2015); 3× NFL rushing yards leader (2008, 2012, 2015); 2× NFL rushing touchdowns leader (2009, 2015); NFL 2010s All-Decade Team; 2× Bert Bell Award (2008, 2012); PFWA NFL All-Rookie Team (2007); 50 Greatest Vikings; Minnesota Vikings Ring of Honor; Jim Brown Trophy (2004); Unanimous All-American (2004); Big 12 Offensive Freshman of the Year (2004); Big 12 Offensive Newcomer of the Year (2004); 3× First-team All-Big 12 (2004–2006); NFL record: Most rushing yards in a game: 296

Career NFL statistics
- Rushing yards: 14,918
- Rushing average: 4.6
- Rushing touchdowns: 120
- Receptions: 305
- Receiving yards: 2,474
- Receiving touchdowns: 6
- Stats at Pro Football Reference

Adrian Lewis Peterson (né Brown; born March 21, 1985) is an American former professional football running back. Peterson played 15 seasons in the National Football League (NFL). He is widely considered to be one of the greatest running backs in football history. He played college football for the Oklahoma Sooners, setting the freshman rushing record with 1,925 yards in 2004. Named a unanimous All-American that year, he became the first freshman to finish as a runner-up in the Heisman Trophy balloting. Peterson finished his college career as the Sooners' third-all-time leading rusher.

Peterson was selected by the Minnesota Vikings seventh overall in the first round of the 2007 NFL draft. As a rookie, he set an NFL record for the most rushing yards in a single game (296) and was named NFL Offensive Rookie of the Year. He was then named the MVP for his performance in the Pro Bowl, and became only the fifth player in NFL history to gain more than 3,000 yards through his first two seasons. In 2010, he became the fifth-soonest player to run for 5,000 yards, doing so in his 51st game.

Peterson tore both his anterior cruciate and medial collateral ligaments in a game in late 2011. Despite that, he returned by the start of the 2012 season, and ended it with 2,097 rushing yards, just nine yards shy of breaking Eric Dickerson's single-season record. For his efforts, he received the NFL MVP Award, the most recent non-quarterback to win the award. In 2013, Peterson became the third-soonest player to reach 10,000 rushing yards in NFL history.

In 2014, Peterson was indicted by a grand jury in Texas on charges of reckless or negligent injury to a child that occurred earlier that year, and was suspended for the rest of the season. A free agent coming into the 2017 season, Peterson signed a two-year contract with the New Orleans Saints, but was traded to the Arizona Cardinals midseason before being released following the season's end. Following that, Peterson played for the Washington Redskins, Detroit Lions, Tennessee Titans, and Seattle Seahawks.

== Early life ==
Peterson was born in Palestine, Texas, to Bonita Brown and Nelson Peterson, who were star athletes in college. His father was a shooting guard for Idaho State, but his dream of a National Basketball Association career was derailed when a gun that his brother was cleaning discharged into his leg. His mother, a three-time Texas state champion at Westwood High School, attended the University of Houston on an athletic scholarship as a sprinter and long jumper. Peterson's best friend was his older brother, Brian. Peterson's father nicknamed him "All Day", because his father said he could go all day.

At age seven, Peterson saw his nine-year-old brother Brian killed by a drunk driver as he rode his bicycle. Around this time, Peterson began to deal with his pain through sports and became interested in football.

His father Nelson participated as an assistant coach. Peterson played in the popular Anderson County Youth Football Program in East Texas. When Peterson was 13, his father was arrested for money laundering in a crack cocaine ring.

== High school career ==
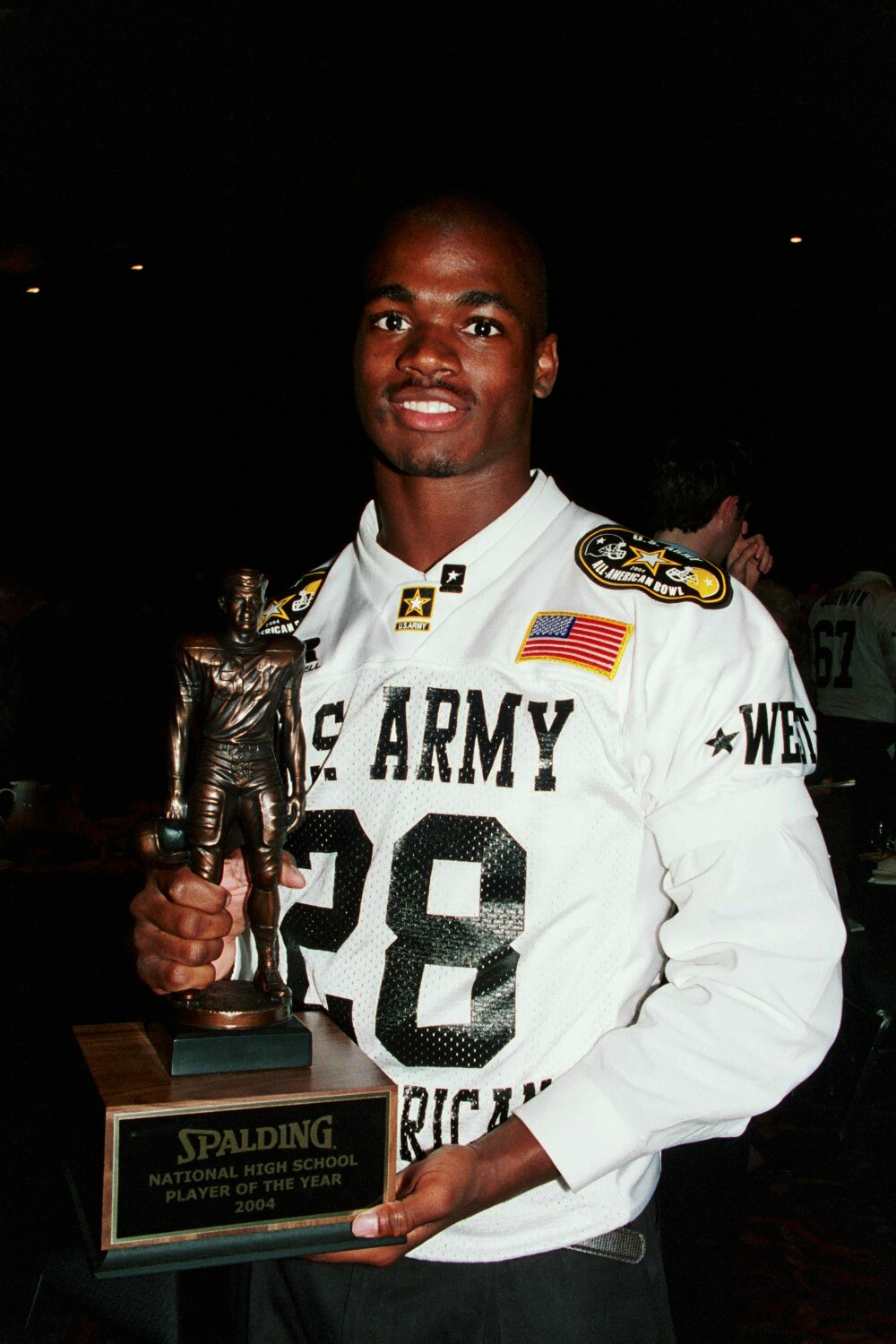
Peterson was awarded the 2004 Hall Trophy as the U.S. Army National Player of the Year.

Peterson was a three-sport standout in football, basketball, and track at Palestine High School. Peterson was most notable in football, which he played during his junior and senior years. During his sophomore year, he was not eligible to play for the Palestine High School Wildcats varsity football team. Peterson's junior season ended with 2,051 yards on 246 carries, an average of 8.3 yards per carry, and 22 touchdowns. During his junior year, he began to attract the attention of Division I recruiters, and realized he would likely have his pick of colleges after his senior year.

As a senior in 2003, he rushed for 2,960 yards on 252 attempts, an average of 11.7 yards per carry, and 32 touchdowns. After a game, players from the other team asked for his autograph. Following Maurice Clarett's unsuccessful attempt to sue the NFL over its age limit in 2004, considerable debate arose over whether any high-school football player might be able to make the leap from the preparatory school to the professional game. The player most frequently mentioned was Peterson.

=== Track and field ===
Peterson followed in his mother's footsteps to excel in track and field at Woodward, where he won several medals in events such as the 100 and 200 m races and triple- and long-jump events. Peterson's coach has stated that he believes that had he not chosen a career in football, Peterson could have become an Olympic sprinter, instead. He recorded a wind-legal time of 10.26 seconds in the 100-meter dash at the 2002 District 15-4A Championships, where he took first by a large margin. He also posted a wind-assisted time of 10.33 seconds at 100 meters at the 2003 UIL state track meet, where he earned a second-place finish behind Ivory Williams, who won the 2004 World Junior Championship over the same distance. At the 2004 District 14-4A championships, Peterson ran the second leg on the Palestine 4 × 100 m relay squad, helping lead them to victory with a time of 41.50 seconds. Peterson has stated that his personal-best times are 10.19 seconds at 100 meters, 21.23 seconds at 200 meters, and 47.6 seconds at 400 meters.

=== College recruiting ===
Regarded as a five-star recruit by both the Rivals.com and Scout.com recruiting networks, Peterson was listed as the best running back and overall prospect in the class of 2004 by Rivals.com. After considering schools such as Texas, Texas A&M, UCLA, Arkansas, and Miami (FL), he decided that he wanted to go to a school where he could be a difference-maker in a national championship run and narrowed his choices down to USC and Oklahoma. Concluding his high school football career at the annual U.S. Army All-American Bowl, he led the West squad with 95 yards on nine carries and scored two touchdowns, and announced at the game that he would attend college at the University of Oklahoma. Following his senior season, he was awarded the Hall Trophy as the U.S. Army National Player of the Year. In addition, he was named the top high-school player by College Football News and Rivals.com.

College recruiting
Name	Hometown	School	Height	Weight	40^{‡}	Commit date
Adrian Peterson; RB	Palestine, Texas	Palestine High School	6 ft 2 in (1.88 m)	210 lb (95 kg)	4.4	Jan 3, 2004
Adrian Peterson; RB	Recruit ratings: Scout: Rivals: (5)					
Overall recruit ranking: Scout: 1 (RB) Rivals: 1 (RB), 1 (Texas), 1 National
‡ Refers to 40-yard dash; Note: In many cases, Scout, Rivals, 247Sports, On3, and ESPN may conflict in their listings of height, weight and 40 time.; In these cases, the average was taken. ESPN grades are on a 100-point scale.; Sources: "2004 Oklahoma Football Commitment List". Rivals.; "2004 Oklahoma College Football Recruiting Commits". Scout.; "Scout.com Team Recruiting Rankings". Scout.; "2004 Team Ranking". Rivals.com.

== College career ==
=== 2004 season ===
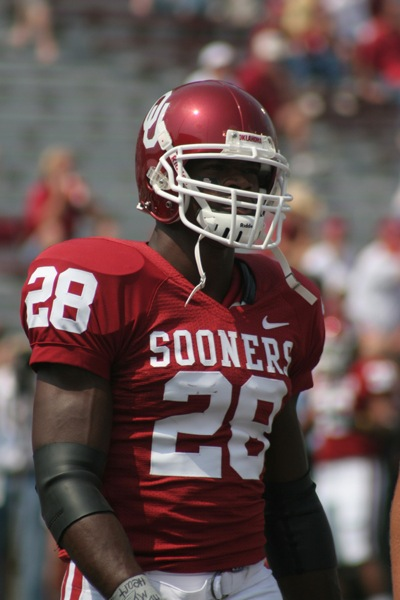
Peterson before a game against the Washington Huskies.

Peterson attended the University of Oklahoma, where he played for the Oklahoma Sooners football team from 2004 to 2006 under head coach Bob Stoops. During his freshman season at Oklahoma, Peterson broke several NCAA freshman rushing records, rushing for a conference-leading 1,925 yards and leading the nation in carries with 339. In each of the first nine games of the season, he rushed for more than 100-yards, which is a freshman record. He rushed for 100 yards in the season opener against Bowling Green, 117 yards against Houston, 183 yards against Oregon, 146 yards against Texas Tech, 225 yards against Texas in the Red River Showdown, 130 yards against Kansas State, and 122 yards against Kansas.

Against the Oklahoma State Cowboys in the Bedlam Series, Peterson had an 80-yard touchdown run and rushed for 161 yards in the third quarter, finishing with a career-high 249 yards. Despite dislocating his left shoulder in the first half, he managed to run for 101 yards and a touchdown on 29 carries, his ninth straight 100-yard game, against Texas A&M. In the next game against Nebraska, he saw little action because of his shoulder injury and finished with 58 yards, which ended his streak of consecutive games with at least 100 yards rushing at nine. In a game against Baylor, Peterson ran for 240 yards, including three second-half touchdowns, and set the NCAA record for most 100-yard games by a freshman with 11 against Colorado. Oklahoma, who were one of the poorest rushing teams the year before, became one of the nation's best.

Despite his record-breaking season, he finished second to USC Trojans quarterback Matt Leinart in the Heisman Trophy voting. Among other honors, he was a finalist for the Doak Walker Award, and the first Oklahoma freshman recognized as a first-team Associated Press All-American. Peterson contributed to a perfect regular season for the Sooners and participated in the 2005 BCS National Championship Game with a berth to the 2005 Orange Bowl against the USC Trojans. USC retooled their defense to stop Peterson and limited him to just 82 yards on 25 carries, as the Trojans defeated the Sooners by a score of 55–19. After the season, he had surgery on his left shoulder to strengthen the muscles around the joint.

2004 Heisman Trophy finalist voting
Finalist	First-place votes	Second-place votes	Third-place votes	Total points
Matt Leinart	267	211	102	1,325
Adrian Peterson	154	180	175	997
Jason White	171	149	146	957

=== 2005 season ===
In the 2005 season, Peterson's playing time was limited by a broken foot. He started off the season with 63 rushing yards and a rushing touchdown in a 17–10 loss to TCU. In the next game, against Tulsa, he had 220 rushing yards and three rushing touchdowns to help the Sooners to the 31–15 victory. He injured his ankle in the first Big 12 Conference game of the season against Kansas State. Despite missing time in four games, he rushed for 1,208 yards and 14 touchdowns on 220 carries, finishing second in rushing yardage in the Big 12. His 2005 season was also notable for a career-long 84-yard touchdown run as part of a 237-yard and two-touchdown performance in a 42–14 victory over Oklahoma State. Oklahoma finished the season with an 8–4 record, its worst season since 1999. Upon the conclusion of the season, he was named a member of the All-Big 12 Conference team.

=== 2006 season ===
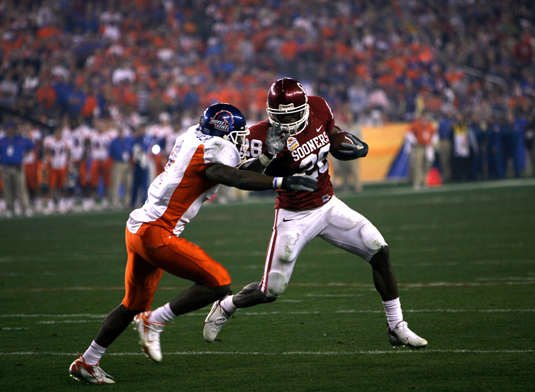
Peterson runs against Boise State in the 2007 Fiesta Bowl

Peterson started the 2006 season off strong, rushing for an average of over 150 yards per game and scoring nine total touchdowns over five games. Peterson's father, Nelson, was released from prison during the 2006 college football season and was able to watch his son as a spectator for the first time on October 14, when Oklahoma played Iowa State. Oklahoma defeated Iowa State in that game; however, on the final drive for the Sooners, Peterson broke his collar bone when he dove into the end zone on a 53-yard touchdown run. During a press conference on October 18, Peterson said he was told by doctors to expect to be out for 4–6 weeks. At the time of the injury, Peterson needed only to gain 150 yards to pass Billy Sims as the University of Oklahoma's all-time leading rusher. He was unable to return for the rest of the Sooners' regular season and missed seven games. The Sooners would turn to Allen Patrick, a junior, and Chris Brown, a freshman, to replace Peterson. The team went on a seven-game winning streak including winning the Big 12 Championship game against the Nebraska Cornhuskers. He returned for their last game against Boise State in the 2007 Fiesta Bowl, where he rushed for 77 yards and two touchdowns in the 43–42 overtime loss. He refused to discuss his plans beyond the end of this season with the press. He concluded his college football career with 1,012 rushing yards his final season, even after missing multiple games due to injury for a total of 4,045 rushing yards in only three seasons. He finished third in school history and 73 yards short of passing Billy Sims as the school's all-time leading rusher.

== Professional career ==
=== Pre-draft ===
On January 15, 2007, Peterson declared that he would forego his senior year of college and enter the 2007 NFL draft. Coming into the league, he was known as a tall, upright runner possessing a rare combination of speed, strength, agility, size, and vision, along with a highly aggressive running style. His rare talent as both a great breakaway and power runner has often raised comparisons to past legends, including Eric Dickerson, Walter Payton, Gale Sayers, O. J. Simpson, Franco Harris, and Jim Brown. Concerns about his injuries suffered during college were noted by the media and potential NFL teams. He started 22 out of 31 games in his college career and had a dislocated shoulder his first year (although he did not miss any games), a high ankle sprain his sophomore year, and a broken collarbone his final year at Oklahoma. His durability was a consideration for at least two teams in their draft analysis, which impacted selection position. Prior to the 2007 NFL Draft, Peterson was compared by professional football scouts to Eric Dickerson.

External videos
- Peterson's NFL Combine workout
- Peterson gets drafted by the Minnesota Vikings in the 2007 NFL Draft

Pre-draft measurables
Height	Weight	Arm length	Hand span	40-yard dash	10-yard split	20-yard split	20-yard shuttle	Three-cone drill	Vertical jump	Broad jump	Wonderlic
6 ft 1 1/2 in (1.87 m)	217 lb (98 kg)	33 3/4 in (0.86 m)	9 1/4 in (0.23 m)	4.41 s	1.57 s	2.60 s	4.40 s	7.09 s	38.5 in (0.98 m)	10 ft 7 in (3.23 m)	16
All values from NFL Combine

=== Minnesota Vikings ===
==== 2007 season ====
On April 28, 2007, Peterson was selected by the Minnesota Vikings in the first round with the seventh overall pick of the 2007 NFL draft. Peterson was the first running back selected and the first of three Oklahoma Sooners to be drafted in the 2007 NFL Draft. At a press conference during the draft, Peterson announced, "My collarbone, I would say it's 90% healed. A lot of teams know that, and I don't see it stopping me from being prepared for the season."

Peterson believed he was a player that a franchise could build around. In an interview with IGN following the NFL Draft, he said, "I'm a player who is coming in with the determination to turn a team around. I want to help my team get to the playoffs, win...and run wild. I want to bring people to the stands. I want people to come to the game to see what I can do next. Things like that can change the whole attitude of an organization. I want to win." He later told the Star Tribune in an interview, "I want to be the best player to ever play this game." Nearly three months after being drafted, he was signed by the Vikings on July 29, 2007. His contract was worth $40.5 million over five years, with $17 million guaranteed.

Peterson began his outstanding rookie year with high expectations for himself; he announced ambitious goals including being named NFL Offensive Rookie of the Year and rushing for over 1,300 yards during the course of the year. Just 11 weeks into his rookie season with the Vikings, Peterson was well on his way to Dickerson's record and considered one of the elite running backs in the NFL.

On September 9, 2007, Peterson ran for 103 yards on 19 carries in his first NFL regular season game against the Atlanta Falcons. In addition to his rushing yardage, he scored his first professional football touchdown on a 60-yard pass reception from quarterback Tarvaris Jackson. Over his first three regular season games, his 431 yards (271 rushing and 160 receiving) from scrimmage are a team record. For his performance in the three games, Peterson received the NFL Offensive Rookie of the Month award for both September and October 2007.

His breakout game as a professional came on October 14, 2007, against the Chicago Bears, highlighted by a three-touchdown performance and a then-franchise record of 224 rushing yards on 20 carries. Peterson established additional team records for a rookie during this game, which included the most 100-yard games rushing and the longest touchdown run from scrimmage. He also set an NFL rookie record with 361 all-purpose yards in a single game. His 607 rushing yards through the first five games of the season is second in NFL history to Eric Dickerson. For his performance, he was named the Offensive Player of the Week for the first time in his career. Following Peterson's record performance, Deion Sanders, now an NFL Network analyst, said about him: "He has the vision of a Marshall Faulk, the power of an Earl Campbell, and the speed of an Eric Dickerson. Let's pray he has the endurance of an Emmitt Smith." He has also been compared to Walter Payton and Tony Dorsett by Star Tribune sports journalist Jim Souhan.

Three weeks later, on November 4, 2007, Peterson broke his own franchise record as well as the NFL single game rushing yard record (previously held by Jamal Lewis since 2003) when he rushed for 296 yards on 30 carries and three rushing touchdowns against the San Diego Chargers in a home game in Minneapolis. That game was his second game of over 200 rushing yards, a feat no other rookie has ever accomplished in a season. Peterson had a 19-yard reception in the game to give him 315 scrimmage yards in the game. Peterson recorded the third-most scrimmage yards in a single game and the sixth game overall with at least 300 scrimmage yards in NFL history. His historic performance earned him his second Offensive Player of the Week title in his rookie season. In addition to the NFL rushing record in a single game, it took him past 1,000 rushing yards for the year after just eight games. His 1,036 rushing yards represents the best eight-game performance by a rookie in NFL history.

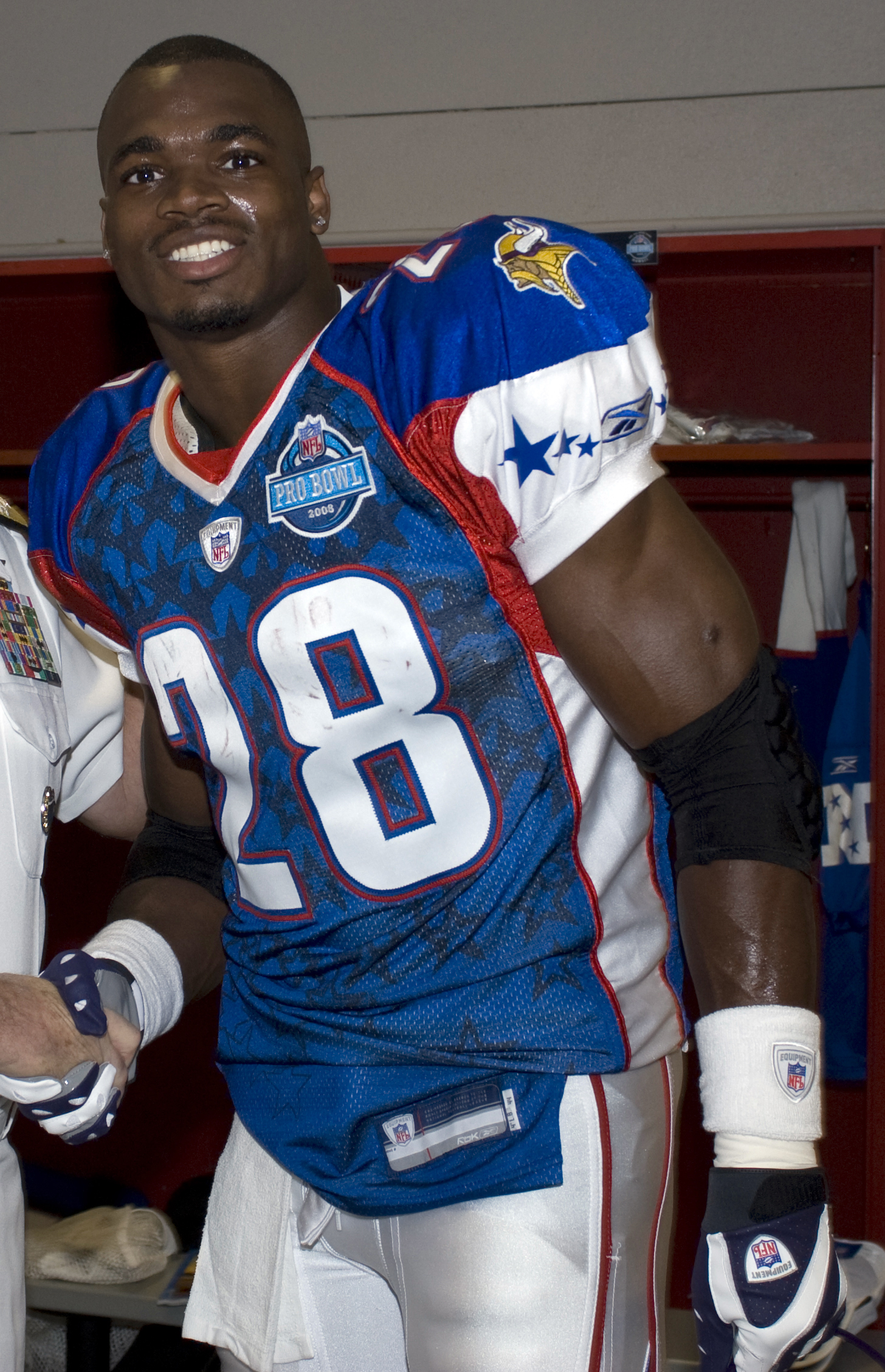
Peterson was named MVP of the 2008 Pro Bowl

In honor of Peterson's record-breaking performance against the San Diego Chargers, the jersey he wore that day was sent to the Pro Football Hall of Fame. On November 11, 2007, just a week later, Peterson injured the lateral collateral ligament in his right knee in a game against the Green Bay Packers. The injury occurred in the third quarter of a 34–0 defeat at Lambeau Field on a low tackle by Packers cornerback Al Harris. Almost a month after the injury, Peterson returned to action on December 2, 2007, against the Detroit Lions scoring two touchdowns and rushing for 116 yards.

On December 18, he was named as the starting running back for the 2008 NFC Pro Bowl team. On January 2, he was named The Associated Press NFL Offensive Rookie of the Year. He was named to the Pro Football Writers Association All-Rookie Team for the 2007 season.

On February 10, 2008, Peterson won the 2008 NFL Pro Bowl MVP award with 16 carries for 129 rushing yards along with two touchdowns. The 129 rushing yards was the second most in Pro Bowl history. He was the first rookie since Marshall Faulk in 1994 to win the Pro Bowl MVP award. Peterson and Faulk are currently the only NFL players to win both the NFL Pro Bowl MVP and Rookie of the Year awards in the same year. Peterson finished in second place in rushing yards (1,341) in the 2007 season behind LaDainian Tomlinson, who finished with 1,474 rushing yards. He also caught 19 passes for 268 yards and returned 16 kickoffs for 412, giving him 2,021 all-purpose yards (6th in the NFL).

==== 2008 season ====
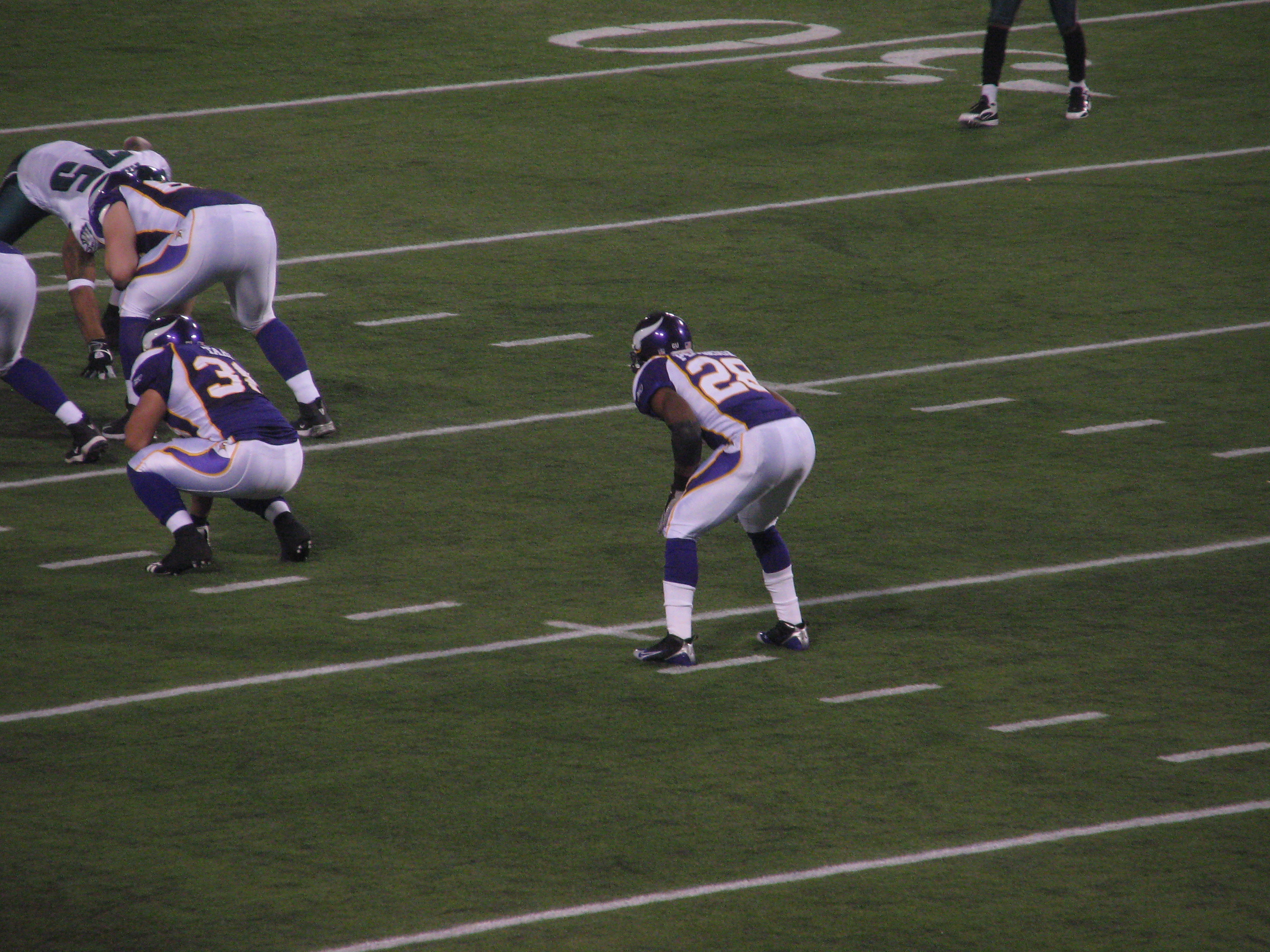
Peterson in a 2008 NFC Wild Card game against the Philadelphia Eagles

Peterson and the Vikings entered the 2008 season with high expectations and as he did during his rookie season, Peterson set high goals for himself including a 2,000-yard campaign and the NFL MVP award. Questions remained as to Peterson's durability and the ability of the Vikings offense to take the focus of opposing defenses off Peterson.

Peterson had a phenomenal second season. He played in all 16 games, of which he started 15. He recorded ten games going over 100 rushing yards to go along with ten rushing touchdowns across the season. His Week 10 performance against the Green Bay Packers earned him his third career Offensive Player of the Week nod. Peterson finished leading the league in rushing with 1,760 yards, which marks the third-most yards in a sophomore season behind Eric Dickerson's 2,105 yard season, and Chris Johnson's 2,006-yard season, which occurred the following season in 2009. In Peterson's first 30 games, he had 3,101 yards, which marks the third best start to a career for running backs behind Dickerson with 3,600 yards and Jim Brown with 3,144 yards. He became the fourth running back to lead the league in yards per game in his first two seasons along with Brown, Earl Campbell, and Dickerson. In recognition of his 2008 season, he was named the recipient of the Bert Bell Award. On January 14, 2009, Peterson was named to his second AP All-Pro team in two years.

The Vikings made the playoffs with a 10–6 record. In his playoff debut, Peterson had 83 rushing yards and two rushing touchdowns in a 26–14 loss to the Philadelphia Eagles in the Wild Card Round.

==== 2009 season ====
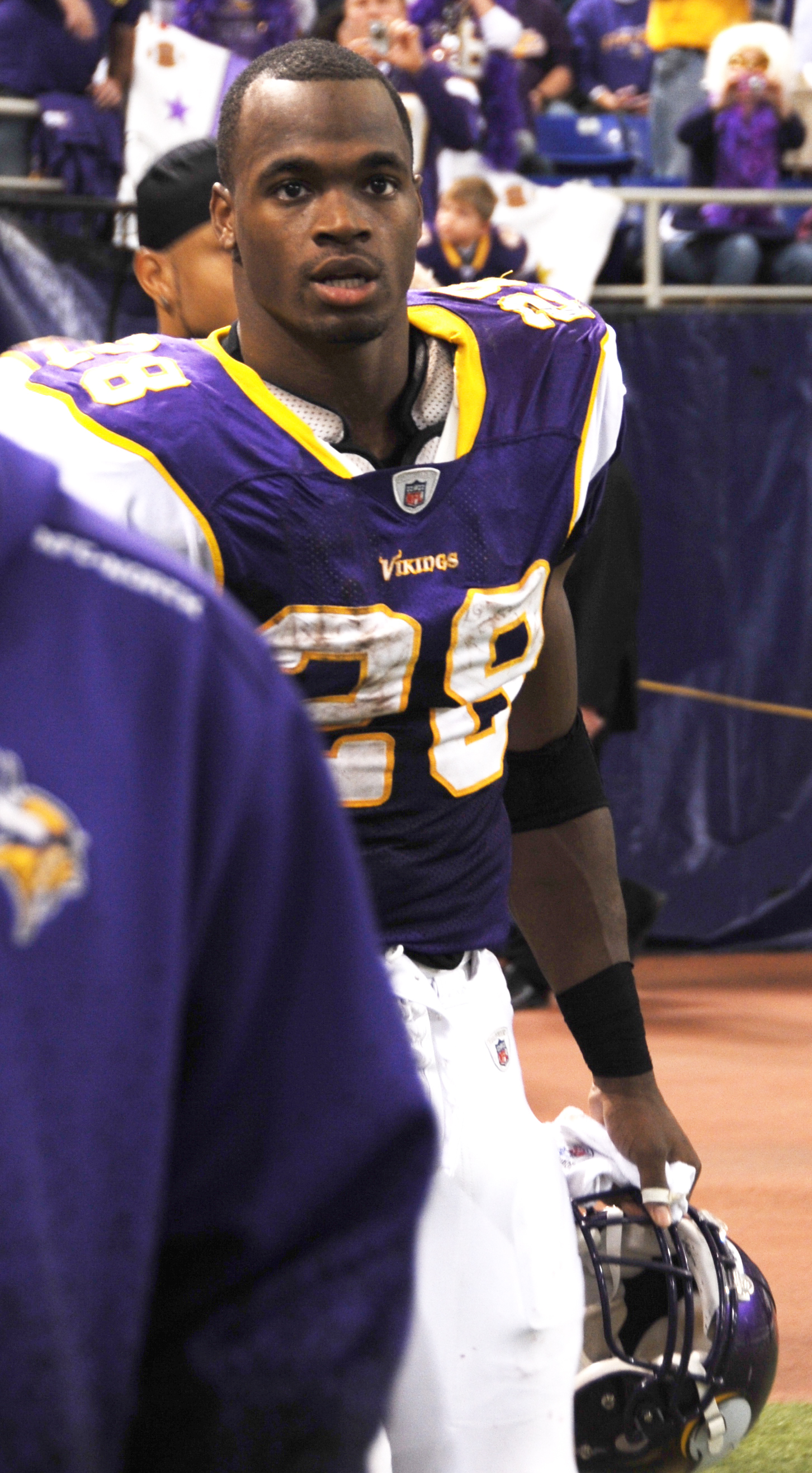
Peterson following a week 10 win over the Detroit Lions, which he ran for 133 yards and 2 touchdowns

Prior to the start of the 2009 season, analysts on ESPN and Scout.com considered Peterson as one of the league's top running backs. However, the arrival of quarterback Brett Favre, one of the greatest quarterbacks in NFL history, coming out of retirement brought both expectation and speculation about Peterson's new role in the offense. Head coach Brad Childress, however, stated that he wanted to continue leaning on Peterson, giving him a large number of carries. Favre worked well into the offense through the first half of the season, re-establishing Peterson's ability with a passing attack. Peterson had 917 rushing yards through Week 10, while the Vikings had a record of 8–1.

Peterson opened the season by rushing for 180 yards on 25 carries and three touchdowns against the Cleveland Browns, setting a new Vikings franchise record for rushing in the season opener. He again broke the hundred-yard barrier in Week 6 against the Baltimore Ravens, with 143 yards and 22 carries. His next 100-yard effort came against the Detroit Lions, with 133 yards on 18 carries, and he was named the FedEx Ground Player of the Week. Overall, he finished the season with 1,383 rushing yards and a league-high 18 rushing touchdowns to go along with a career-high 43 receptions for 436 receiving yards.

In the playoffs, Peterson had 63 rushing yards and a 19-yard reception as Minnesota defeated the Dallas Cowboys by a score of 34–3 in the Divisional Round. However, they lost to the eventual Super Bowl XLIV champion New Orleans Saints in the NFC Championship in overtime by a score of 31–28. Peterson rushed for 122 yards and three touchdowns in the loss. Peterson was voted to his third consecutive Pro Bowl on December 29. He was the starting running back for the NFC team. For the second consecutive season, he was named as a first-team All-Pro.

==== 2010 season ====
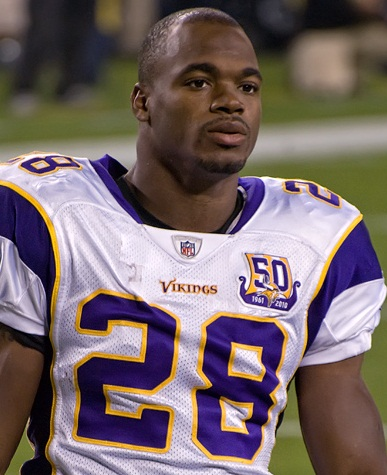
Peterson at Lambeau Field in 2010

Peterson opened the 2010 season strongly with 392 yards and three touchdowns through the first three weeks. His Week 3 performance of 160 rushing yards and two rushing touchdowns against the Detroit Lions earned him NFC Offensive Player of the Week honors. His 80-yard rushing touchdown in the third quarter was tied for the longest rush by any player that season. In Week 6, he went over the 5,000 yard career rushing mark against the Dallas Cowboys. He tied for the sixth fastest to reach the 5,000-yard plateau. At Week 7, Peterson was second in the league with 684 yards, averaging 114 yards per game, but the Vikings had dropped to a disappointing record of 2–4. By Week 16, Peterson had rushed for 1,267 yards with 12 touchdowns. Peterson, who was infamous for fumbling the ball in previous seasons, had a dramatic change in the 2010 season with only one fumble during the regular season, a remarkable turnaround from his previous performances. While the Vikings missed the playoffs, Peterson represented his team in the Pro Bowl. After the season, Peterson was voted as the third-ranked player and top overall running back by his fellow players on the NFL Network's list of the NFL Top 100 Players of 2011.

==== 2011 season ====
On September 10, 2011, the Vikings signed Peterson for $96 million over the course of seven seasons, making him the highest-paid running back in NFL history. Peterson reached the 6,000-yard milestone on September 18, 2011, in a loss to the Tampa Bay Buccaneers. On October 9, Peterson scored three touchdowns in the first quarter against the Arizona Cardinals, setting a new franchise record. He later earned NFC Offensive Player of the Week honors for his performance during the game. In a Week 10 game against the Oakland Raiders, Peterson suffered a high ankle sprain late in the first quarter. He was later ruled out for their Week 11 game against the Atlanta Falcons.

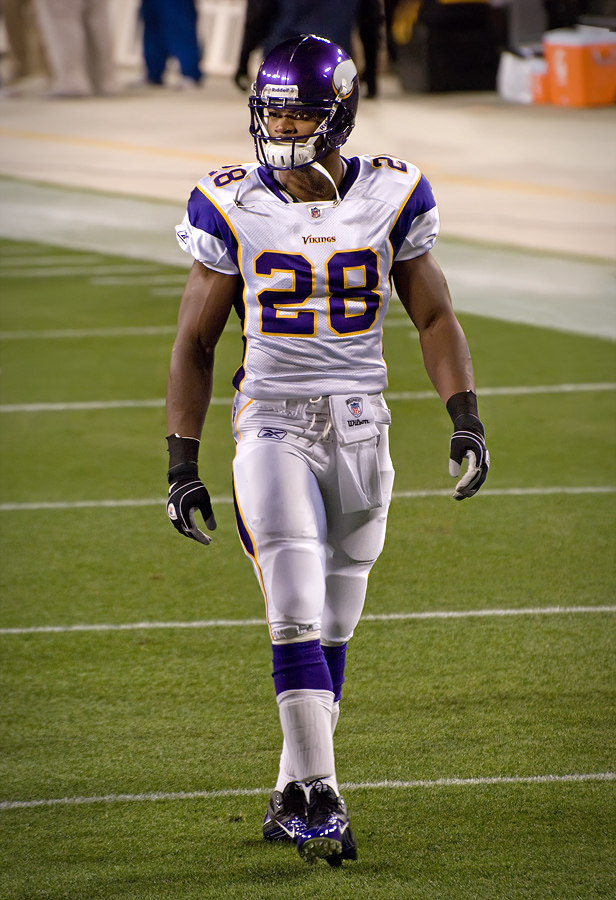
Peterson in 2011

On December 24, Peterson was injured by safety DeJon Gomes and needed help off the field in a Week 16 game against the Washington Redskins. On December 26, he was placed on injured reserve having suffered a torn ACL and MCL.

In the 2011 season, Peterson had 208 carries for 970 rushing yards and 12 rushing touchdowns to go along with 18 receptions for 139 receiving yards and one receiving touchdown. He was ranked eighth by his fellow players on the NFL Top 100 Players of 2012.

==== 2012 season: MVP season ====
Peterson started Week 1 against the Jacksonville Jaguars, although his status was listed as questionable. He rushed for 84 yards and two touchdowns in his first game in eight months after his ACL and MCL tear. He passed Robert Smith to most rushing yards in franchise history. On October 21, against the Arizona Cardinals, he had 153 rushing yards and a rushing touchdown in the 21–14 victory. For the sixth time in his career, he earned Offensive Player of the Week honors. On November 4, against the Seattle Seahawks, he had 182 rushing yards and two rushing touchdowns in the 30–20 loss. He followed that up with 171 rushing yards and a touchdown in a 34–24 victory in the second divisional matchup with the Detroit Lions. On December 2, against the Green Bay Packers, he had 210 rushing yards and a rushing touchdown in the 23–14 loss. In Week 14, against the Chicago Bears, he had 154 rushing yards and two rushing touchdowns to earn another Offensive Player of the Week nod. In Week 15, against the St. Louis Rams, he had 212 rushing yards and a rushing touchdown in the 36–22 win. By Week 16, Peterson was leading the NFL in rushing with 1,898 yards and averaging 6.0 yards a carry. In addition, he had 11 touchdowns, along with 215 receiving yards.

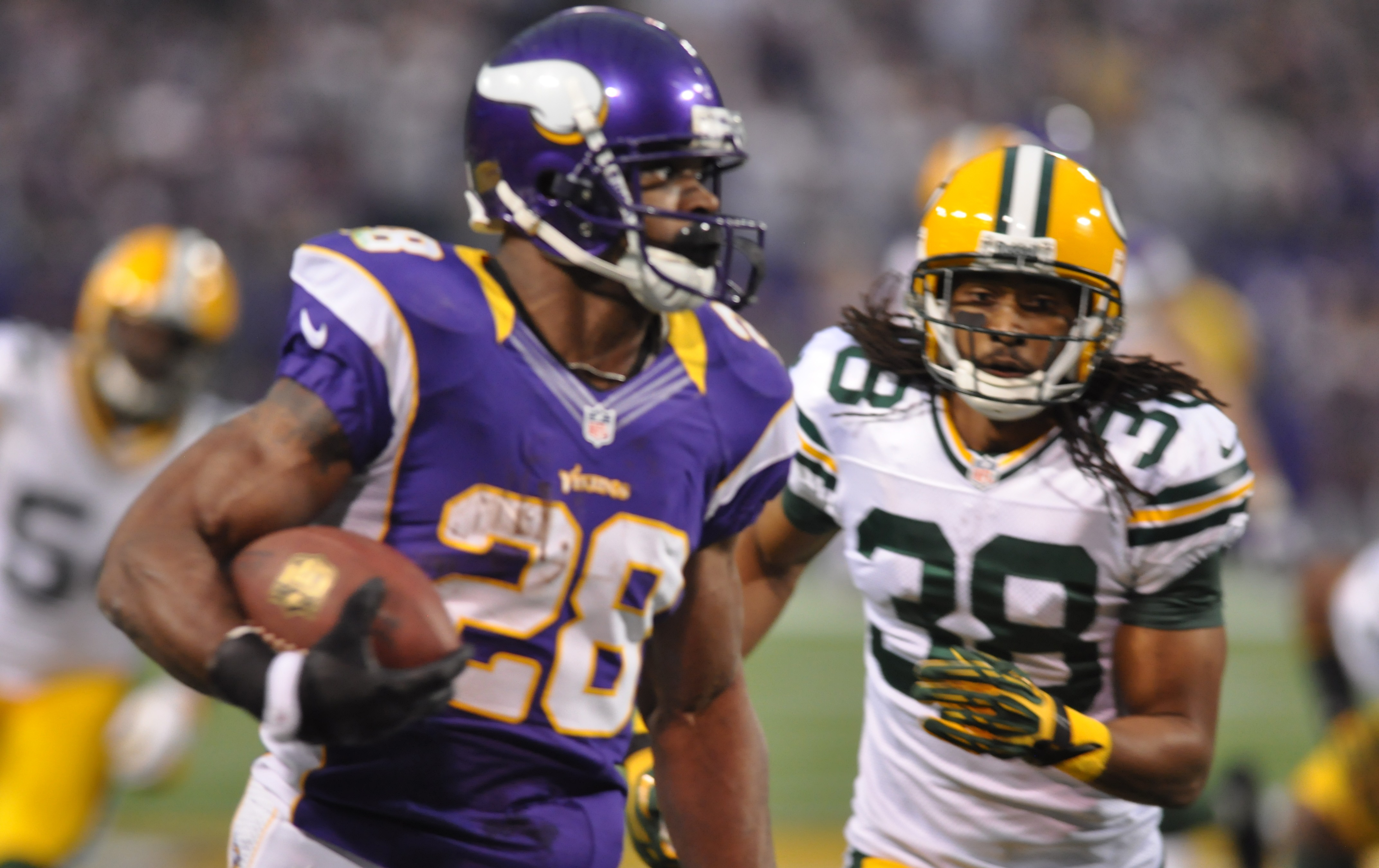
Peterson in the week 17 game against Green Bay, where he came nine yards short of breaking the all-time rushing record

Entering Week 17, he needed 208 yards to break the NFL single-season record for the most rushing yards (2,105), set in 1984 by Eric Dickerson. That week, the Vikings played the Green Bay Packers needing a win to clinch a playoff berth. The game was tied at 34 in the fourth quarter when Peterson ran for 26 yards, setting the Vikings up for a game-winning field goal with three seconds left. The Vikings chose the field goal, which sent them to the playoffs, but also left Peterson nine yards short of breaking the record. In December, Peterson rushed for a total of 861 yards, the most for a single month in NFL history. As a result, he earned NFC Offensive Player of the Month for December. Peterson became the second player (Earl Campbell, 1980) to rush for 150 or more yards in seven games during an NFL season and had 1,019 yards after contact. He finished the 2012 season with 348 carries for 2,097 rushing yards, the second-most ever for a running back in a single season. Peterson became only the seventh player in NFL history to eclipse 2,000 rushing yards. The Vikings improved from 3–13 in 2011 to 10–6, qualifying as the NFC's sixth seed in the playoffs. In the Wild Card Round, with Vikings' starting quarterback Christian Ponder unable to start due to injury, the Vikings fell to the Green Bay Packers in a rematch by a score of 24–10. The team's record, alongside Peterson's historic season, earned him the NFL Offensive Player of the Year and the NFL Most Valuable Player awards. In addition, he earned the Bert Bell Award for the second time in his career. His comeback from an ACL tear the season before also earned him second place in NFL Comeback Player of the Year award voting, coming in second to Denver Broncos quarterback Peyton Manning. He was named to his fifth career Pro Bowl and was named as a first-team All-Pro for the third time. After the completion of the season, Peterson underwent surgery for a sports hernia. It became known that Peterson played through this injury starting in the last quarter of the season. He was ranked as the best player in the NFL amongst his peers on the NFL Top 100 Players of 2013. As of the 2025 NFL season, Peterson remains as the most recent non-quarterback player in the league to win the NFL MVP award.

==== 2013 season ====
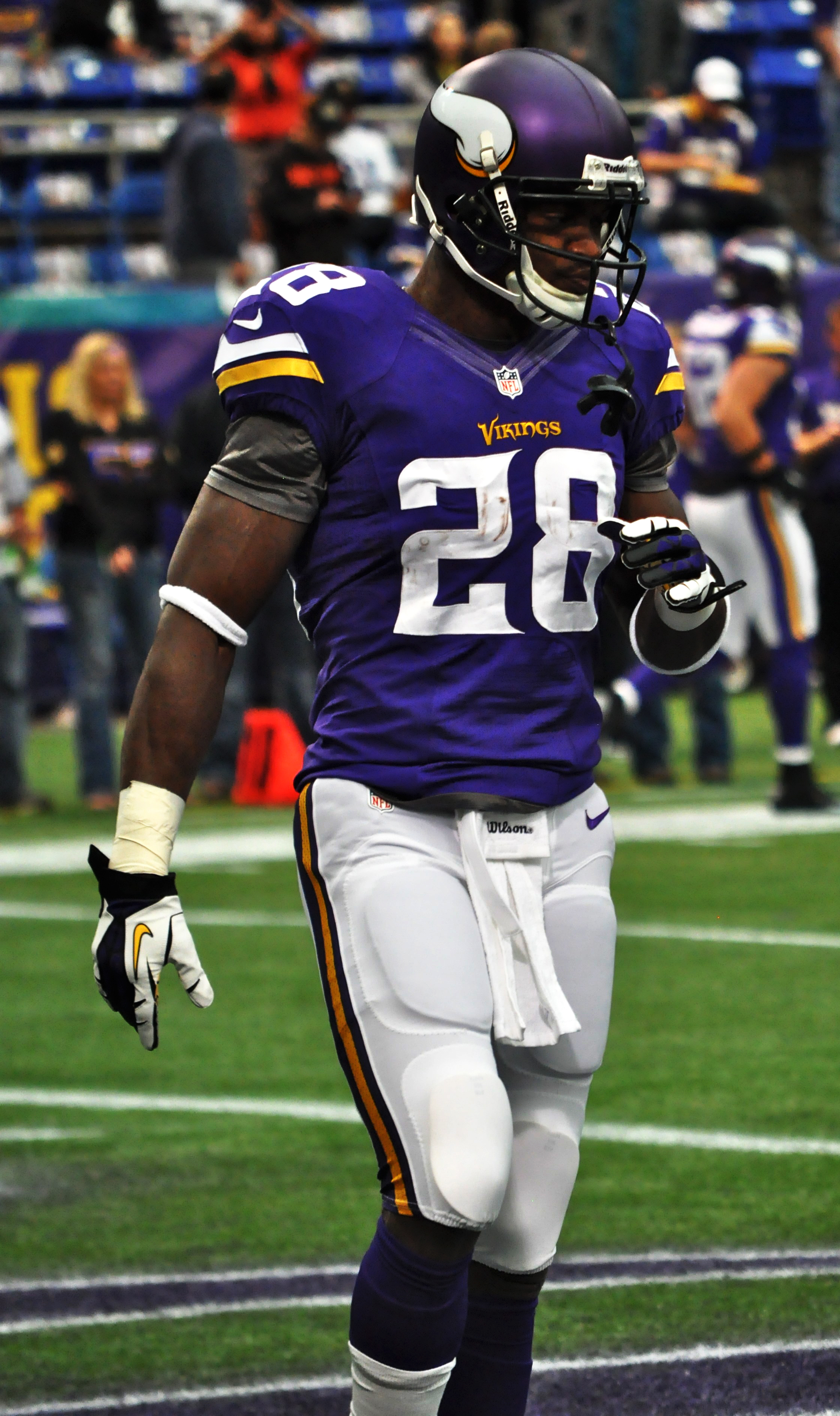
Peterson in 2013 against the Cleveland Browns

Peterson opened his 2013 season by taking his first carry of the year 78 yards for a touchdown. He finished the game with 18 carries for 93 rushing yards and two rushing touchdowns in the 34–24 loss to the Detroit Lions. Peterson struggled in the first three games of the season without All-Pro fullback Jerome Felton, but upon his return in Week 4, Peterson rushed for 140 yards against the Pittsburgh Steelers. On October 10, Peterson missed practice for a "personal reason" and it was later revealed that his son was in critical condition. Peterson's son later died due to injuries suffered from an assault, apparently by the mother's live-in boyfriend. The child was two years old. Despite the loss and time spent answering relentless media inquiries, he played against the Carolina Panthers. The Panthers defeated the Vikings by a score of 35–10. On November 3, against the Dallas Cowboys, he had 140 rushing yards and a touchdown. On November 24, in a 26–26 tie with the Green Bay Packers, he had 146 rushing yards and a rushing touchdown. On December 1, against the Chicago Bears, he had 35 carries for 211 rushing yards in the 23–20 victory. Against the Bears, Peterson reached 10,000 career rushing yards. He became the third fastest player to reach the milestone. Peterson turned in the fifth highest rushing yardage total for the season with 1,266 yards and 10 touchdowns in just 14 games. He was named to his sixth career Pro Bowl as a result of his successful season. He was ranked fourth by his fellow players on the NFL Top 100 Players of 2014 for his fourth consecutive finish in the top ten in the players' ranking.

==== 2014 season ====
Peterson opened the 2014 season rushing for 75 yards on 21 carries in a 34–6 road victory over the St. Louis Rams. Five days later, on September 12, 2014, Peterson was indicted on child abuse charges and subsequently deactivated for Minnesota's Week 2 game against the New England Patriots. Amid the child abuse allegations, on September 15, the Vikings reinstated Peterson and he was scheduled to play against the New Orleans Saints. However, on September 17, Peterson was placed on the NFL's Exempt/Commissioner's Permission list, a similar transaction to the Restricted List, which required that Peterson was to "remain away from all team activities". After accepting a plea deal in early November, Peterson planned to return as early as Week 11. On November 18, the NFL announced that Peterson would be suspended for the remainder of the 2014 season without pay. In December, his league appeal was upheld, and Peterson was scheduled for a federal court appeal hearing on February 6, 2015. Despite his tumultuous season, he was ranked 62nd by his fellow players on the NFL Top 100 Players of 2015, dropping 58 spots from the previous season.

==== 2015 season ====
On February 26, 2015, Peterson was reinstated to the league after United States district judge David Doty ruled in the NFL Players Association's lawsuit against the NFL on Peterson's behalf. Peterson returned to the Vikings on June 2. Peterson struggled in his first game back, taking the ball ten times for 31 yards in a 20–3 loss to the San Francisco 49ers. He bounced to form in Week 2, picking up 134 yards on 29 carries against the Detroit Lions (the eighth 100+ yard rushing game against the Lions in his career). The Vikings rushed out to an 8–3 start, with Peterson averaging 106 rushing yards per game and breaking eight touchdowns. The period was highlighted with the game against the Oakland Raiders on November 15, in which Peterson rushed 26 times for 203 yards, including an 80-yard touchdown run. This was his sixth career 200+ yard rushing game, tying with O. J. Simpson for the most in history. Two weeks later, against the Atlanta Falcons, he had 158 rushing yards and two rushing touchdowns in the 20–10 victory. For the second time in his career, he earned NFC Offensive Player of the Month.

Peterson struggled more down the stretch, eclipsing 100 yards only once in the final five regular season games and one playoff game. In the first quarter of a narrow 23–20 loss on the road against the Arizona Cardinals in Week 14, Peterson scored his 100th career touchdown. Week 17 saw the Vikings defeat the Green Bay Packers for the NFC North Division Championship. In the game, Peterson recovered a Teddy Bridgewater fumble late in regulation to help preserve the 20–13 victory. Peterson was just the third player in history over the age of 30 to lead the NFL in single-season rushing yards. He finished with a league-high 327 carries for 1,485 rushing yards and 11 touchdowns. He earned this third career rushing title, becoming the first player to accomplish the feat three times since Barry Sanders. He was named as a first-team All-Pro for the fourth time and was chosen for his seventh career Pro Bowl. He was ranked as the best running back and the fifth best player on the NFL Top 100 Players of 2016 players' list. In the Wild Card Round of the playoffs against the Seattle Seahawks, he had 45 rushing yards, 12 receiving yards, and a fumble in the narrow 10–9 home loss.

==== 2016 season ====
Peterson started the 2016 season quietly with only 31 rushing yards on 19 carries in a 25–16 win over the Tennessee Titans. With the Vikings playing the first ever regular season game at U.S. Bank Stadium in Week 2 against the Green Bay Packers on Sunday Night Football, Peterson rushed for 19 yards until leaving the game with an apparent right knee injury. The next day, it was revealed that the right knee had a torn meniscus. On September 22, Peterson underwent successful surgery to repair the meniscus. It was also revealed that the knee had a mild LCL sprain, but it did not need surgery. He was placed on injured reserve on September 23, 2016. On December 17, the Vikings activated Peterson to the active roster. He returned to action in Week 15 against the Indianapolis Colts. Despite only playing three games, Peterson was still ranked 98th by his peers on the NFL Top 100 Players of 2017.

On February 28, 2017, the Vikings announced that they would not exercise Peterson's 2017 option on his contract, making him a free agent at the start of the 2017 league year. Had the Vikings exercised the option, they would have had to pay him $18 million for the 2017 season. Peterson's tenure with the Vikings ended with him leading the NFL in rushing yards and rushing touchdowns during that time period from the 2007 season to the 2016 season.

=== New Orleans Saints ===
On April 25, 2017, Peterson signed a two-year, $7 million contract with the New Orleans Saints, which included a $2.5 million signing bonus. Peterson played his first game with the Saints on September 11, against his former team, the Minnesota Vikings. He was limited to only 18 rushing yards on six carries as the Saints lost by a score of 29–19 on Monday Night Football. In the same game, Vikings rookie Dalvin Cook broke the team record for rushing yards on rookie debut, a record previously held by Peterson himself. In four games with the Saints, of which he started one, Peterson rushed for 81 total yards on 27 carries.

=== Arizona Cardinals ===
On October 10, 2017, Peterson was traded to the Arizona Cardinals for a conditional sixth-round draft pick. He played his first game with the Cardinals on October 15, in which he rushed for 134 yards and two touchdowns in a 38–33 win over the Tampa Bay Buccaneers, earning him NFC Offensive Player of the Week for the first time since Week 14 of the 2012 season. During Week 9 against the San Francisco 49ers, Peterson posted another impressive performance with a career-high 37 carries for 159 rushing yards as the Cardinals won 20–10. He was sidelined for Weeks 13 and 14 due to a neck injury, and was subsequently placed on injured reserve on December 15, 2017. Overall, in the 2017 season, he finished with 529 rushing yards, two rushing touchdowns, 11 receptions, and 70 receiving yards. On March 13, 2018, Peterson was released.

=== Washington Redskins ===
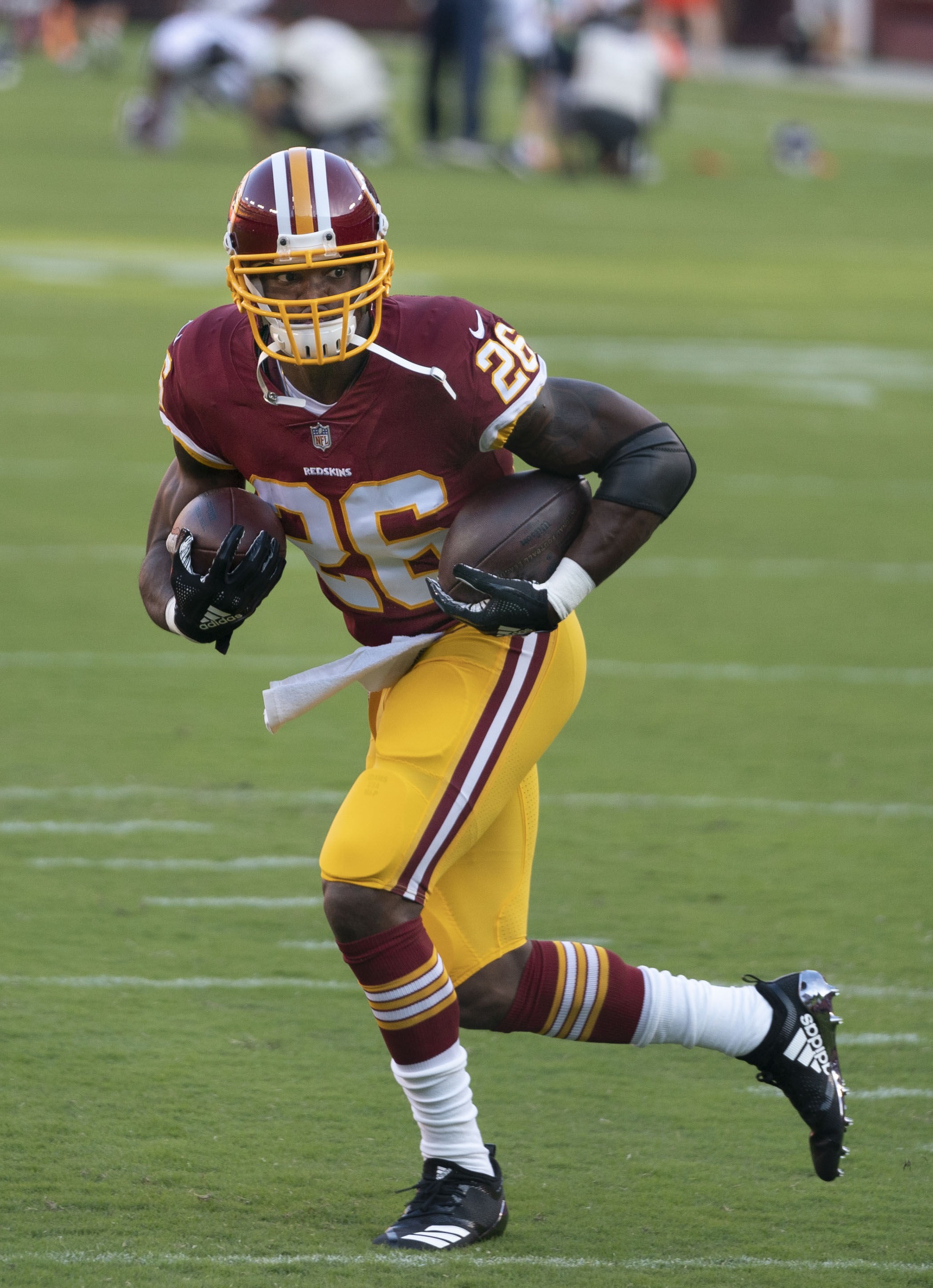
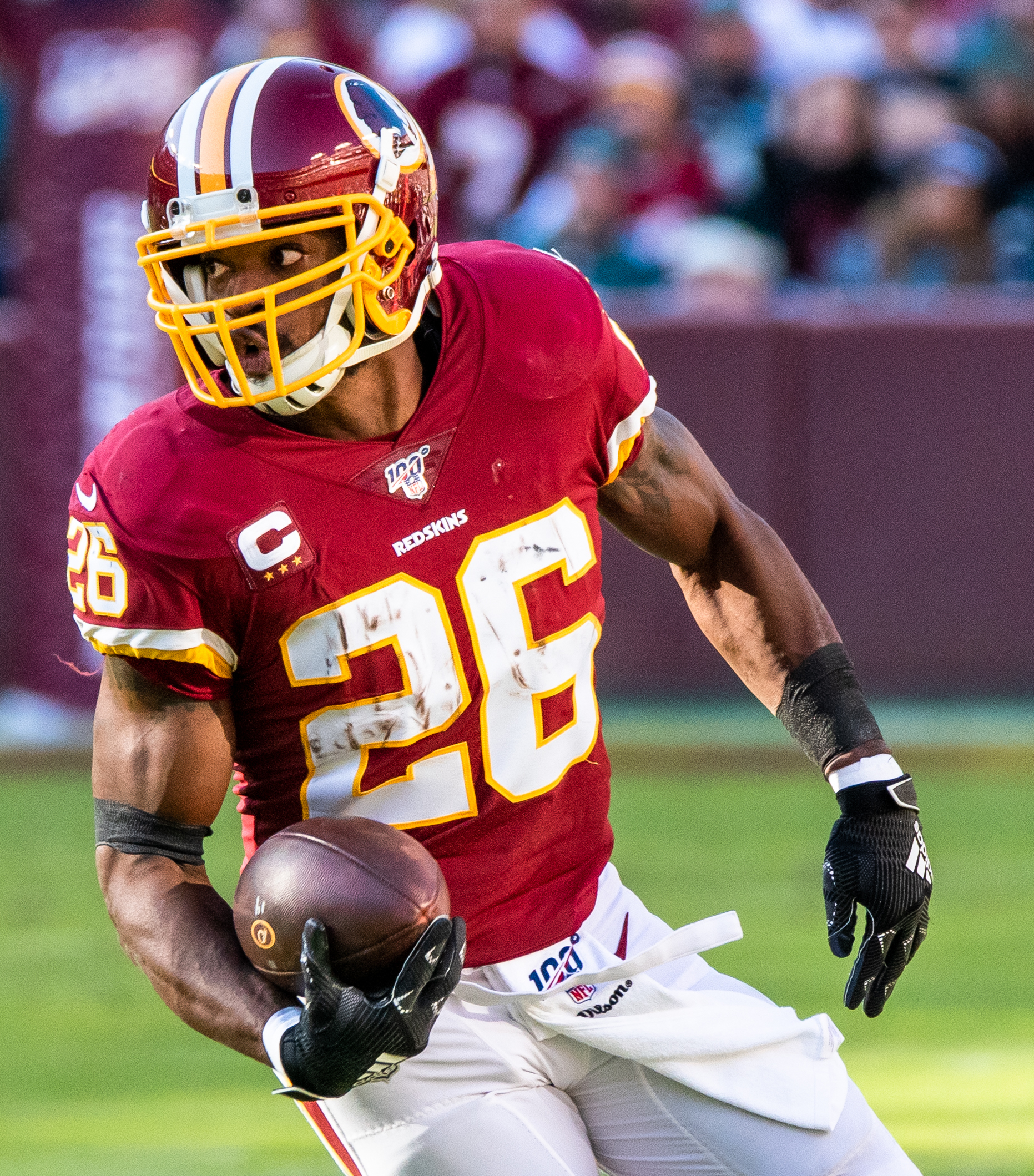
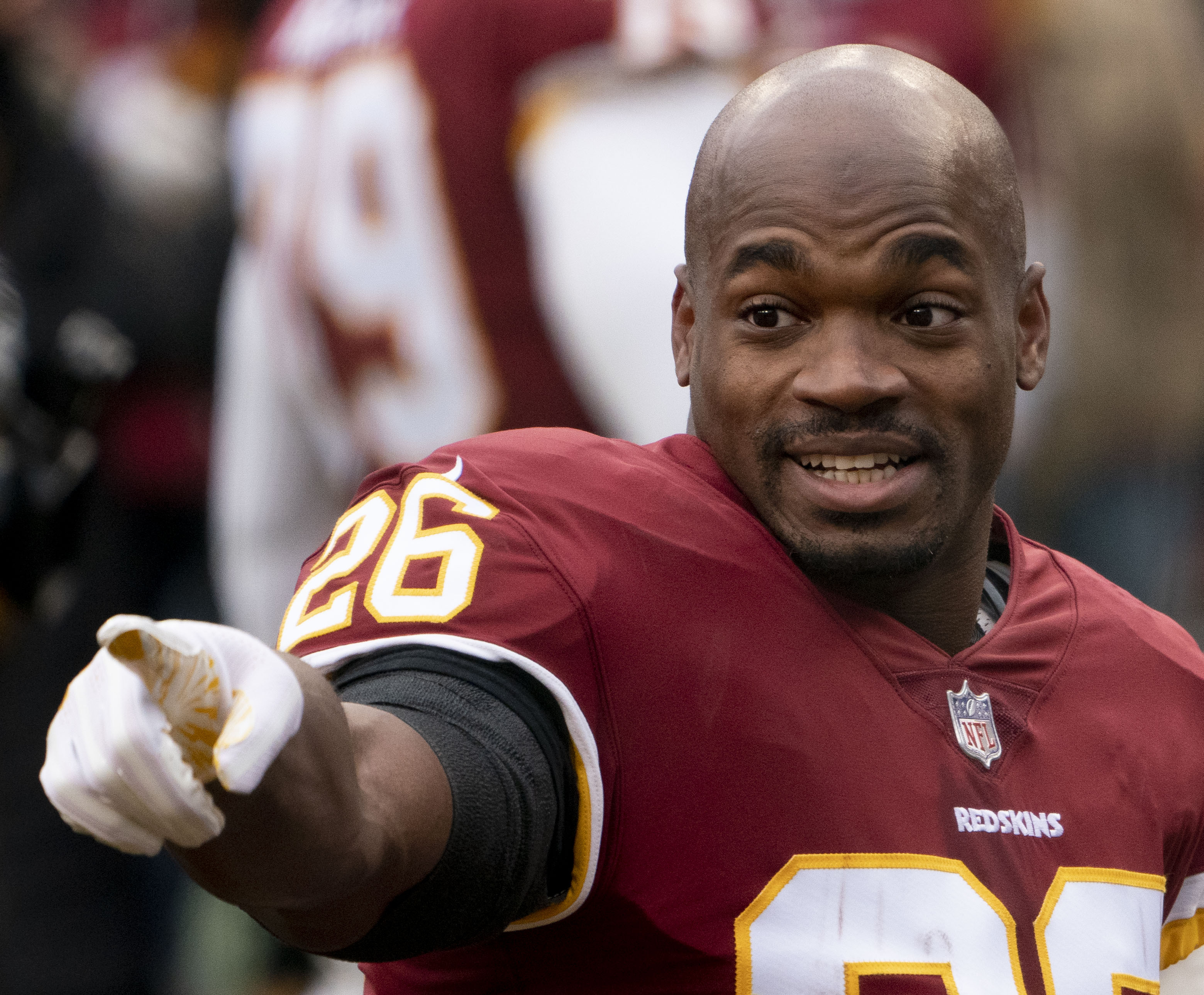
Peterson during his two seasons with the Washington Redskins

==== 2018 season ====
Peterson signed a one-year, veteran minimum contract with the Washington Redskins on August 20, 2018. He was signed following a number of preseason injuries to their running backs. In Washington's regular-season opener at the Arizona Cardinals on September 9, Peterson rushed for 96 yards on 26 carries and caught two passes for another 70 yards. This moved Peterson past Jim Brown to move into tenth on the career rushing yards list with 12,372 yards. He scored his 100th career rushing touchdown in the 24–6 win over the Cardinals, moving him into a three-way tie for seventh place on the career rushing touchdowns list. In Week 3, in a 31–17 victory over the Green Bay Packers, Peterson had 19 carries for 120 rushing yards and two rushing touchdowns. In Week 8, Peterson rushed for 149 yards on 26 carries, including a 64-yard touchdown in a 20–13 win over the New York Giants, earning him NFC Offensive Player of the Week. In Week 13, against the Philadelphia Eagles on Monday Night Football, Peterson recorded a career-high 90-yard rushing touchdown in the 28–13 loss. In Week 16, Peterson ran for 119 yards on 26 carries against the Tennessee Titans, passing the 1,000-yard mark on the season. In the game, Peterson passed Eric Dickerson in eighth place on the career rushing yards list with 13,318 yards. Peterson became one of five NFL players in history aged 33 or older to rush for 1,000 yards in a season. In addition, he became the oldest player to reach the mark since John Riggins in 1984. Peterson was held to no yards on four carries in the regular season finale against the Philadelphia Eagles making his final total 1,042 rushing yards and seven rushing touchdowns on the season.

==== 2019 season ====
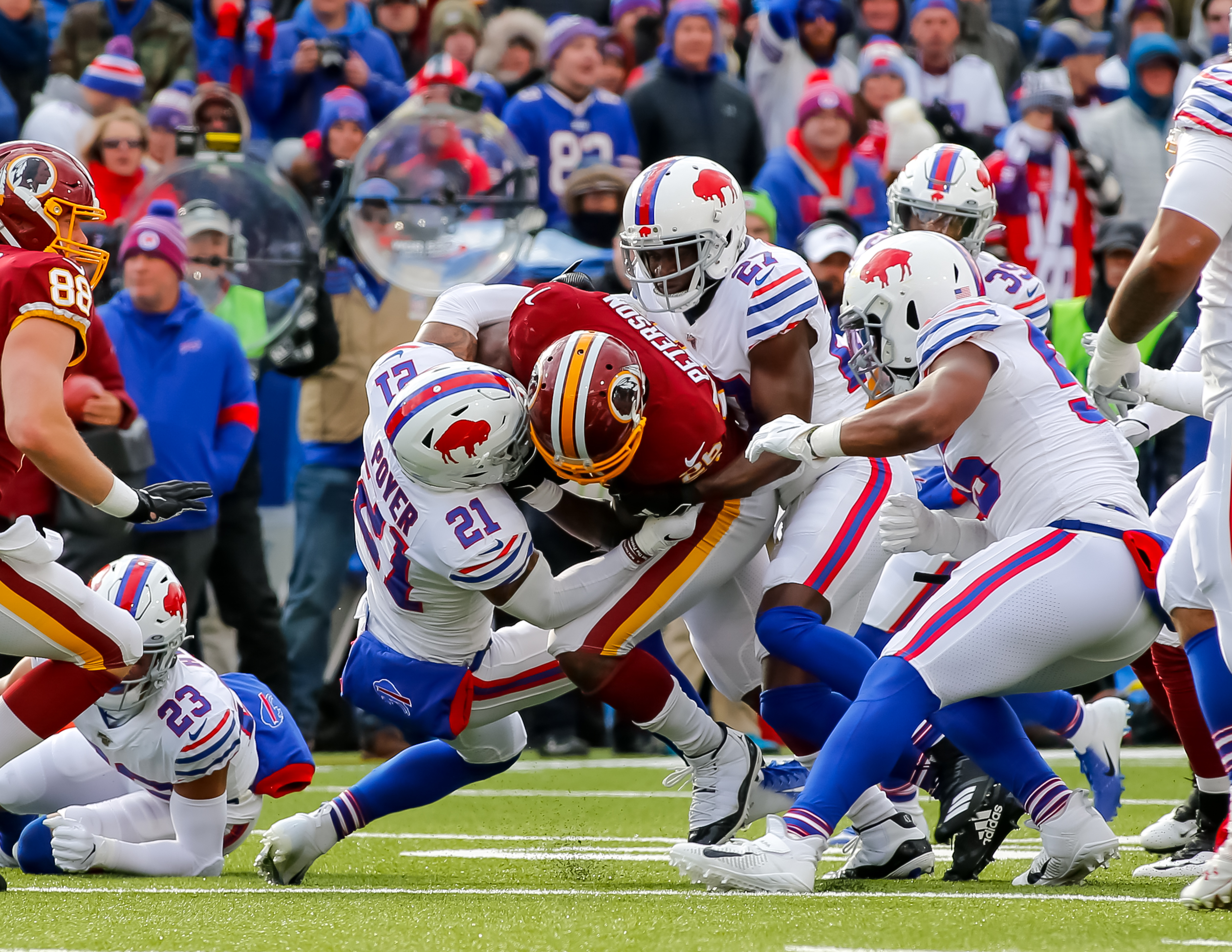
Peterson running against the Buffalo Bills in 2019

On March 13, 2019, Peterson signed a two-year, $8 million contract to stay with the Washington Redskins. After being a healthy scratch in Week 1, Peterson was slated to become the starter following a knee injury to starter Derrius Guice. He got the start in Week 2 against the Dallas Cowboys. In the 31–21 loss, Peterson rushed for his 107th career touchdown, which passed Jim Brown for fifth on the all-time rushing touchdown list. In Week 8, against the Minnesota Vikings, Peterson passed Jerome Bettis and LaDainian Tomlinson for sixth all-time on the career rushing yards list.

On December 15, against the Philadelphia Eagles, Peterson passed Curtis Martin for fifth all-time in rushing yards, as well as becoming the tenth player in NFL history to reach 3,000 career rushing attempts and tied Walter Payton for fourth all-time in rushing touchdowns with 110. Peterson finished the season with 211 carries for 898 rushing yards and five rushing touchdowns while adding 17 receptions for 142 receiving yards. He recorded two games going over 100 rushing yards. He was the recipient of the Art Rooney Award. Peterson was named to the Pro Football Hall of Fame All-Decade Team for the 2010s. He was released by the team on September 4, 2020.

=== Detroit Lions ===
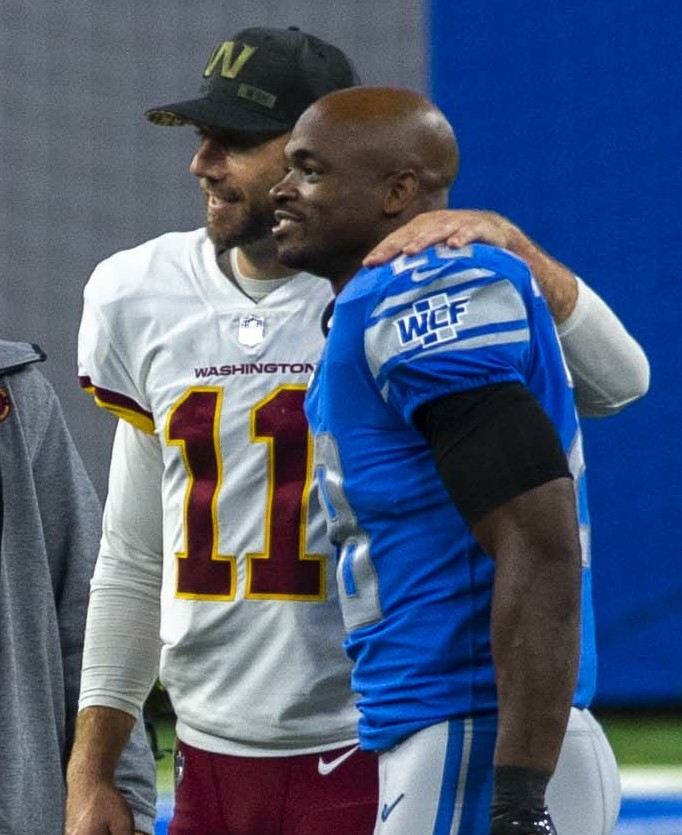
Peterson with Alex Smith in 2020

On September 6, 2020, Peterson signed a one-year $1.05 million contract with the Detroit Lions. In his first game for the Lions, he had 114 yards from scrimmage in a 27–23 loss to the Chicago Bears. In Week 12, against the Houston Texans, he had two rushing touchdowns in the 41–25 loss. In Week 13 against the Chicago Bears, Peterson had two touchdowns, including the game winner late in the fourth quarter, during the 34–30 win. Overall, Peterson appeared in 16 games and started ten games for the Lions in 2020. Throughout the season, he shared the backfield with D'Andre Swift and Kerryon Johnson. He finished with 156 carries for 604 yards and seven rushing touchdowns.

=== Tennessee Titans ===
After an injury to running back Derrick Henry, the Tennessee Titans signed Peterson to their practice squad on November 2, 2021. He was promoted to the active roster on November 5, 2021. He recorded his first rushing touchdown as a Titan in his team debut against the Los Angeles Rams in Week 9. On November 23, 2021, the Titans waived Peterson.

=== Seattle Seahawks ===
On December 1, 2021, Peterson was signed to the Seattle Seahawks' practice squad. On December 4, Peterson was activated off the practice squad for the Seahawks' Week 13 game against the San Francisco 49ers, which the Seahawks won 30–23. Peterson scored a rushing touchdown in that game and tied Jim Brown for tenth on the all-time rushing touchdowns list with 126. Peterson became the first player in NFL history to score a rushing touchdown with six different teams. He was inactive for the remaining five games of the 2021 season, and became a free agent at season's end.

Peterson remained unsigned through the entirety of the 2022 season. Prior to the 2023 season, Peterson stated that he had not retired from professional football and stated that he was willing to play for one more season, though he also stated that he would officially retire if he did not play in 2023.

== Career statistics ==
=== NFL ===
Legend
	NFL MVP & OPOTY
	Led the league
**Bold**	Career high

==== Regular season ====
Year	Team	Games		Rushing					Receiving					Fumbles	
Year	Team	GP	GS	Att	Yds	Avg	Lng	TD	Rec	Yds	Avg	Lng	TD	Fum	Lost
2007	MIN	14	9	238	1,341	5.6	73	12	19	268	**14.1**	60T	**1**	4	3
2008	MIN	16	15	**363**	1,760	4.8	67T	10	21	125	6.0	16	0	**9**	**4**
2009	MIN	16	15	314	1,383	4.4	64T	**18**	**43**	**436**	10.1	**63**	0	7	**4**
2010	MIN	15	15	283	1,298	4.6	80T	12	36	341	9.5	34	**1**	1	1
2011	MIN	12	12	208	970	4.7	54	12	18	139	7.7	22	**1**	1	0
2012	MIN	16	16	348	**2,097**	**6.0**	82T	12	40	217	5.4	20	**1**	4	2
2013	MIN	14	14	279	1,266	4.5	78T	10	29	171	5.9	22	**1**	5	3
2014	MIN	1	1	21	75	3.6	17	0	2	18	9.0	9	0	0	0
2015	MIN	16	16	327	1,485	4.5	80T	11	30	222	7.4	49	0	7	3
2016	MIN	3	3	37	72	1.9	13	0	3	8	2.7	7	0	1	1
2017	NO	4	1	27	81	3.0	11	0	2	4	2.0	2	0	0	0
2017	ARI	6	6	129	448	3.5	27T	2	9	66	7.3	13	0	3	2
2018	WAS	16	16	251	1,042	4.2	**90T**	7	20	208	10.4	52	**1**	3	2
2019	WAS	15	15	211	898	4.3	32	5	17	142	8.4	22	0	3	2
2020	DET	16	10	156	604	3.9	38	7	12	101	8.4	23	0	0	0
2021	TEN	3	2	27	82	3.0	16	1	4	8	2.0	5	0	0	0
2021	SEA	1	1	11	16	1.5	7	1	0	0	0.0	0	0	1	0
Career		184	167	3,230	14,918	4.6	90T	120	305	2,474	8.1	63	6	49	27

==== Postseason ====
Year	Team	Games		Rushing					Receiving					Fumbles	
Year	Team	GP	GS	Att	Yds	Avg	Lng	TD	Rec	Yds	Avg	Lng	TD	Fum	Lost
2008	MIN	1	1	20	83	4.2	**40T**	2	0	0	0.0	0	0	0	0
2009	MIN	2	2	**51**	**185**	3.6	27	**3**	**3**	**33**	**11.0**	**19**	0	**2**	0
2012	MIN	1	1	22	99	**4.5**	18	0	1	8	8.0	8	0	0	0
2015	MIN	1	1	23	45	2.0	13	0	2	13	6.5	8	0	1	**1**
Career		5	5	116	412	3.6	40T	5	6	54	9.0	19	0	3	1

=== College ===
Season	Team	GP	Rushing				Receiving		
Season	Team	GP	Att	Yds	Avg	TD	Rec	Yds	TD
2004	Oklahoma	13	339	1,925	5.7	15	5	12	0
2005	Oklahoma	11	221	1,104	5.0	14	9	50	0
2006	Oklahoma	7	188	1,012	5.4	12	10	136	1
Total		31	748	4,041	5.4	41	24	198	1

== Career highlights ==
=== Awards and honors ===
NFL

- NFL Most Valuable Player (2012)
- NFL Offensive Player of the Year (2012)
- PFWA NFL MVP (2012)
- 2× Bert Bell Award (2008, 2012)
- NFL Alumni Running Back of the Year (2008)
- NFL Offensive Rookie of the Year (2007)
- PFWA All-Rookie Team (2007)
- 4× First-team All-Pro (2008, 2009, 2012, 2015)
- 3× Second-team All-Pro (2007, 2010, 2013)
- 7× Pro Bowl (2007–2010, 2012, 2013, 2015)
- Pro Bowl MVP (2007)
- 3× NFL rushing yards leader (2008, 2012, 2015)
- 2× NFL rushing touchdowns leader (2009, 2015)
- Art Rooney Award (2019)
- 3× FedEx Ground Player of the Year (2008, 2012, 2015)
- Minnesota Vikings All-Mall of America Field Team
- NFL 2010s All-Decade Team
- 50 Greatest Vikings
- 9 × NFC Offensive Player of the Week
- 2 × NFC Offensive Player of the Month
- 6× NFL Top 100 — 3rd (2011), 8th (2012), 1st (2013), 4th (2014), 5th (2016), 98th (2017)

College

- Jim Brown Trophy (2004)
- Unanimous first-team All-American (2004)
- Big 12 Offensive Freshman of the Year (2004)
- Big 12 Offensive Newcomer of the Year (2004)
- 3× First-team All-Big 12 (2004–2006)

=== Records and other accomplishments ===
- Most rushing yards in a single game (296; vs. San Diego Chargers, November 4, 2007)
- Most rushing yards in any eight-game period (1,322)
- Most 60+ yard touchdown runs in a career (13)
- Tied-most 50+ yard runs in a single season (7, with Barry Sanders)
- NFL MVP (2012)
- 3-time NFL rushing yards leader (2008, 2012, 2015)
- First player in NFL history to score a rushing touchdown with six different teams

==== Vikings franchise records ====
- Most career rushing touchdowns (97)
- Most rushing yards in a single season: 2,097 (2012)
- Most rushing touchdowns in a single season: 18 (2009)
- Most career rushing yards (11,747)
- Most career carries (2,418)

==== Redskins franchise records ====
- Longest rushing touchdown (90)

==== Pro Bowl records ====
- Most career rushing touchdowns (4)

== Personal life ==
One of Peterson's half-brothers was murdered the night before Peterson participated in the NFL Combine. When Peterson was a teenager, his father was sentenced to 10 years in prison for laundering drug money. Peterson has six children. His two-year-old son died on October 11, 2013, at a hospital in Sioux Falls, South Dakota, due to injuries sustained during an alleged assault by Joseph Robert Patterson, the boyfriend of the child's mother. Peterson had learned about his son only a few weeks prior to his death, and had never met him.

Peterson identifies as a Christian. He spoke of his faith in relation to his injuries, "This is a blessing in disguise. I'll come back stronger and better than I was before. What flashed in my mind was, 'I can do all things through Christ who strengthens me.'"

Peterson is the nephew of former NFL running back Ivory Lee Brown. Peterson is friends with offensive tackle Trent Williams, who was a teammate at the University of Oklahoma and with the Washington Redskins. In 2016, he and Williams opened a gym in Houston that includes a soccer field, an MMA training area and an incline running hill.

In 2017, a video clip of Peterson went viral as he did a random street interview on how to patiently handle road rage situations with the interviewer not knowing who Peterson was until he presented himself at the end.

Peterson appeared in the Season 4 finale of The League.

His daughter Ari Peterson played basketball for Providence Academy in Plymouth, Minnesota and currently plays for Minnetonka High School. As an eighth grader at Providence, she received offers from the University of Minnesota Golden Gophers and Ohio State Buckeyes.

== Legal issues ==
On September 12, 2014, Peterson was indicted by a Montgomery County, Texas, grand jury on charges of reckless or negligent injury to a child, after he had used a wooden implement to injure his 4-year-old son in Spring, Texas, in May. The prosecution in the case alleged that Peterson used a tree branch to beat his son repeatedly on his back, buttocks, genitals, ankles, and legs. Peterson described the implement as a "switch", a form of punishment that was used on Peterson in his own childhood. Photos posted on TMZ.com showed his son's legs with slash-like wounds. Peterson was subsequently deactivated for one game by the Vikings. Furthermore, he was placed on the commissioner's exempt list for the remainder of the season.

On November 4, 2014, Peterson pleaded no contest to the misdemeanor charge of recklessly assaulting his son. He avoided a jail sentence after reaching a plea agreement. Peterson was put on probation and also fined $4,000. He was also ordered to undergo 80 hours of community service. Peterson was suspended by the NFL. His 2014 season was over after arbitrator Shyam Das ruled in favor of the NFL on November 18, 2014, saying, "the league can keep Adrian Peterson on the commissioner's exempt list," effectively terminating any possibility the Minnesota Vikings running back would play again that season.

In December 2014, Harold Henderson, the NFL-appointed arbitrator for Peterson's appeal affirmed Peterson's unpaid suspension until at least spring 2015. However, the NFL Players Association said it was "considering immediate legal remedies" to the decision. On August 4, 2016, ESPN reported that the NFL won an appeal in a case against Peterson, reversing a ruling which had overturned Peterson's suspension and fine. In 2018, Peterson admitted that he was still using a belt to discipline his son.

In 2018, Peterson was ordered to repay a Minnesota bank for defaulting on a 2016 loan. In July 2019, a Maryland state judge ordered him to pay another creditor $2.4 million.

In 2018, DeAngelo Vehicle Sales LLC, a Pennsylvania loan company, sued Peterson after he defaulted on a 2016 loan and failed to make the full payment of $5.2 million by March 1, 2017. In 2019, Peterson reached a settlement agreement. In January 2021, Peterson was ordered by a New York State Supreme Court judge to pay DeAngelo Vehicle Sales LLC $8.3 million after Peterson defaulted on the settlement. In February 2024, court records were made public that Peterson had not paid any of the $8.3 million owed and that some of his personal assets had been forcibly seized. TexMax Auctions showed many of Peterson's assets up for sale, including his NFL Offensive Rookie of the Year and NFL MVP trophies.

On February 13, 2022, Peterson was arrested by the Los Angeles Airport Police for a domestic violence incident with his wife, Ashley, on a Los Angeles International Airport flight to Houston, Texas. Due to the incident, the plane was forced to return to the airport gate and Peterson was removed from the plane. The same day, Peterson posted a $50,000 bond and was released from Los Angeles Airport Police's custody. Days later, Peterson's wife made a statement that at no point during the flight did Peterson strike or hit her but that they had had a verbal argument. The Los Angeles District Attorney's office stated the domestic violence charge against Peterson would be dropped.

In the early morning of April 25, 2025, the day after the 2025 NFL draft began, Peterson was arrested in Minneapolis for a fourth-degree driving while intoxicated charge and booked into jail. He was traveling 83 mph in a 55 mph zone and allegedly had a blood-alcohol content of .14. He had been at the Minnesota Vikings draft party. He would be released from a Hennepin County jail after posting a $4,000 bond.

On October 26, 2025, Peterson was arrested in Sugar Land, Texas on DWI and gun charges. This was Peterson's second DUI arrest. He was jailed before being released on a $3,000 bond.

== Post-playing career ==
In July 2022, It was announced that Peterson would face fellow NFL veteran Le'Veon Bell in an exhibition boxing match. The fight was originally scheduled for July 31 at the Crypto.com Arena in Los Angeles, but was postponed after AnEsonGib, a fighter in the card's main event, had medical issues. On September 10, at Banc of California Stadium, Peterson was defeated by Bell in a fifth-round technical knockout after Peterson was knocked down and was unable to continue.

In 2023, Peterson participated in the ABC reality competition series Dancing with the Stars. Peterson and his dance partner Britt Stewart finished in 11th place.

== Exhibition boxing record ==
1 fight	0 wins	1 loss
By knockout	0	1

No.	Result	Record	Opponent	Type	Round, time	Date	Location	Notes
1	Loss	0–1	Le'Veon Bell	TKO	5 (5), 0:30	September 10, 2022	Banc of California Stadium, Los Angeles, California, U.S.	
