= Larry S. Bankston =

American politician

Larry Stephen Bankston Sr.

Louisiana State Senator for District 15 (East Baton Rouge, East Feliciana, Pointe Coupee, St. Helena, Tangipahoa, West Baton Rouge, and West Feliciana parishes)
- In office 1988–1996
- Preceded by: Thomas H. Hudson
- Succeeded by: Wilson Fields

Personal details
- Born: January 22, 1951 (age 75) Baton Rouge, Louisiana, U.S.
- Party: Democratic
- Spouse(s): (1) Jane Vance Bankston, now Jane Smith (2) Lynn Naebers Krielow Bankston
- Children: From first marriage: Larry Stephen Bankston Jr. Lauren Bankston Petty; Benjamin V. Bankston; Hunter W. Bankston; Stepchildren: Kendall J. Krielow; Ashlyn C. Krielow
- Education: Broadmoor Senior High School Louisiana State University Loyola University New Orleans Law School
- Occupation: Lawyer

Larry Stephen Bankston, Sr. (born January 22, 1951), is an attorney from Baton Rouge, Louisiana, who served from 1988 to 1996 as a Democratic member of the Louisiana State Senate from the southeastern District 15 (East Baton Rouge, East Feliciana, Pointe Coupee, St. Helena, Tangipahoa, West Baton Rouge, and West Feliciana parishes).

== Background ==
Bankston is the son of the late long-term Louisiana Democratic Party chairman Jesse Bankston and the former Ruth Paine (1918–1997). Ruth Bankston was a member of the East Baton Rouge Parish Democratic Executive Committee and was a delegate to two national party conventions. Larry Bankston has a sister, Shirley B. Newsham, and two brothers, Dale Leon Bankston and Jesse Bankston, Jr., an assistant district attorney in East Baton Rouge Parish.

Bankston graduated from Broadmoor Senior High School and Louisiana State University, both in Baton Rouge, and Loyola University Law School in New Orleans. He is a member of the legal honor society Phi Delta Phi and contributed to the Loyola Law Review. Bankston was admitted to the bar in 1976.

From his first marriage to Jane Vance (now Mrs. Jane Smith), Bankston has four children: Dr. Larry "Chip" Bankston, Jr., Laura Bankston Petty, Benjamin V. Bankston, and Hunter W. Bankston. From his second marriage to the former Lynn Naebers Krielow, Bankston has two stepchildren, Kendall J. Krielow and Ashlyn C. Krielow. On December 19, 2007, Larry "Chip" Bankston, an orthopaedic physician then in residency in Birmingham, Alabama, lost both his wife, the former Jennifer "Jenny" Gibbs, and six-week-old son, Graham Gibbs Bankston, who are interred in Minneapolis, Minnesota. The deaths in Birmingham were attributed to the mother's postpartum depression.

== Political career ==
From 1978-88, Bankston was a staff attorney for the office of the state attorney general in Baton Rouge. From 1979 to 1982, he was assistant parish attorney for East Baton Rouge Parish. From 1982 to 1988, Bankston was a member of the Baton Rouge Metropolitan Council, an elected governing body.

Bankston was first elected to the Senate in the 1987 general election in a narrow outcome with the Republican businessman Jay Dardenne, since Louisiana's Commissioner of Administration under Governor John Bel Edwards. Bankston prevailed by 287 votes, 12,619 (50.6 percent) to 12,332 (49.4 percent).

The seat was vacated by Democrat Thomas H. Hudson, a Baton Rouge lawyer who was President Pro Tempore of the Senate, the second-ranking leadership position, during his third term (1984–88). Bankston was reelected in 1991 under revised district boundaries in the nonpartisan blanket primary with 51.2 percent of the vote over four fellow Democratic candidates.

Bankston compiled a largely progressive voting record in the Senate, siding almost always with the positions of Edwin Washington Edwards, Victor Bussie, and Planned Parenthood, amongst other individuals and organizations. He was a supporter of casino gambling, abortion rights, and the repeal of right-to-work laws. Prior to 1992, he was a floor leader for Governor Buddy Roemer.

Bankston did not seek a third term in the 1995 primary, and the seat was won by Democrat Wilson Fields, brother of then-U.S. Representative Cleo Fields, an African American who ran for governor in 1995 but was defeated by Mike Foster.

== Federal racketeering conviction ==
In 1994, Bankston, the chairman of the Senate Judiciary Committee, met in his law office with Fred Goodson, the owner of a video poker truck stop in Slidell in St. Tammany Parish. According to the Federal Bureau of Investigation, Bankston and Goodson, a close friend of Bankston's colleague, Gerry Hinton, discussed a plan to manipulate the legislative process so as to protect the interests of the video poker companies. In return, the key lawmakers would net clandestine financial interests in the video poker truck stops.

The late C. B. Forgotston, an attorney, government watchdog, and an opponent of gambling, then from New Orleans who relocated to Hammond, referred to the Bankston case, accordingly: "It's one of the things we were worried about in the beginning: that it [gambling] would totally corrupt our political system. ... People would just laugh and say our system is already corrupt. But you've never seen anything like this."

On October 4, 1996, Bankston was indicted on five counts of racketeering. In 1997, Bankston was found guilty on two of the counts. One count was the acceptance of a bribe from Fred Goodson. The bribe was phantom "rent" of $1,555 monthly paid to Bankston for "non-use" of the lawmaker's beachfront condominium in Gulf Shores, Alabama. Prosecutors determined the arrangement a "bribe" and a "sham". He was given a 41-month sentence and ordered to pay a $20,000 fine. Bankston served most of his sentence at the Federal Correctional Institution in Beaumont, Texas. While in prison, Bankston appealed to the United States Court of Appeals for the Fifth Circuit in New Orleans, but the judges upheld his conviction on July 27, 1999.

Bankston was released from the Bureau of Prisons on November 6, 2000, and he then served a remaining portion of the sentence in a half-way house in Baton Rouge. On March 9, 2002, Bankston was disbarred by the Louisiana Supreme Court, retroactive to November 19, 1997. On February 5, 2004, with only one dissenting vote, the disciplinary committee recommended that the high court re-admit Bankston to the practice of law. There had been concern by the committee that Bankston had not been sufficiently remorseful over the commission of his crimes. He practices law at Bankston and Associates at 8708 Jefferson Highway in Baton Rouge.

Preceded by Thomas H. Hudson	Louisiana State Senator for District 15; Larry Stephen Bankston, Sr. 1988-1996	Succeeded by Wilson Fields
