= Palestine High School (Texas) =

Public school in Texas, United States

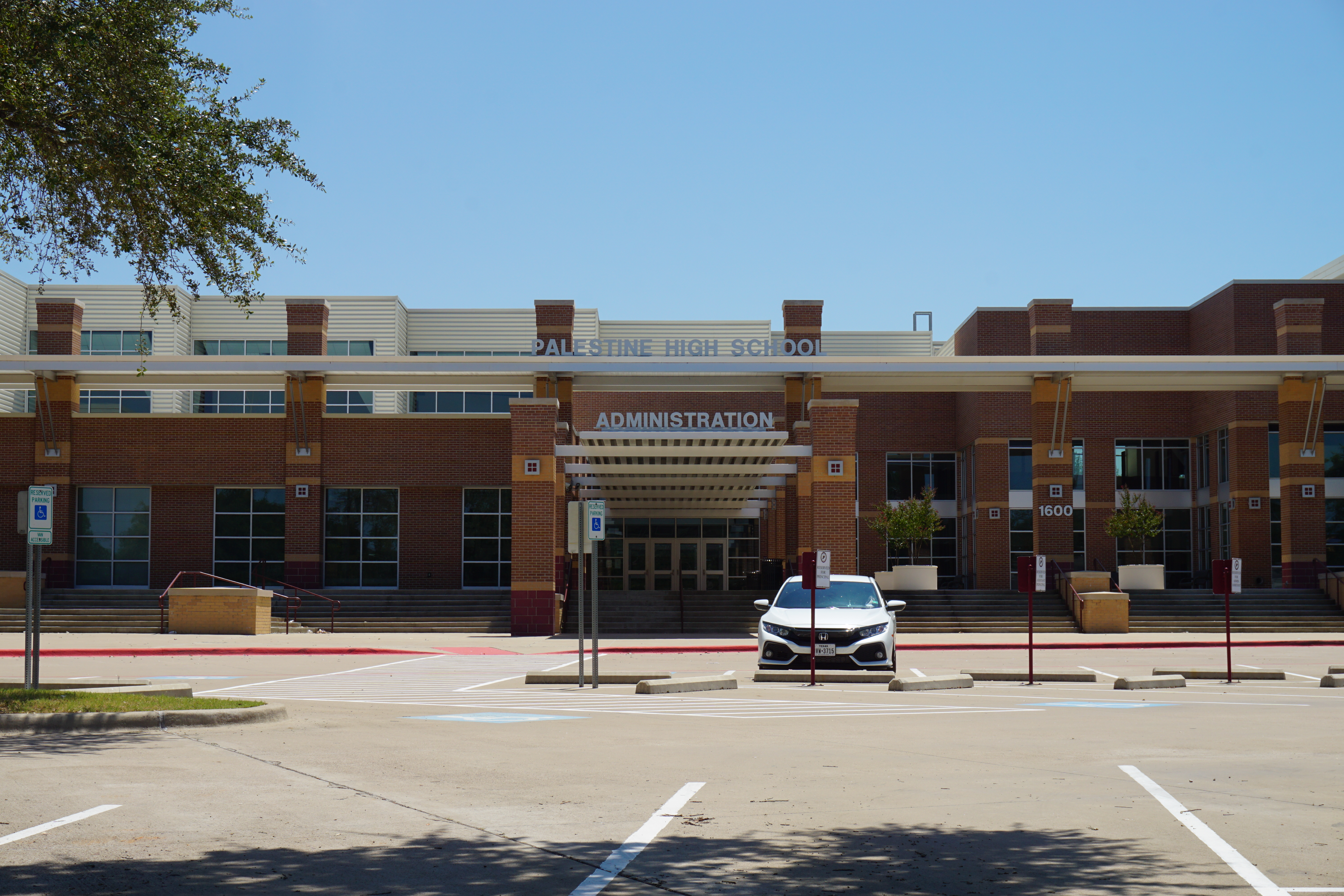

Location
- 1600 South Loop 256; Palestine, Anderson County, Texas 75801-5898; United States; 31.73974°N 95.60594°W

Information
- School type: Public, high school
- Established: 1932
- Locale: Town: Distant
- School district: Palestine ISD
- NCES School ID: 483405003788
- Principal: William Stewart
- Staff: 79.34 (on an FTE basis)
- Grades: 9–12
- Enrollment: 1,016 (2023–2024)
- Student to teacher ratio: 12.81
- Colors: Maroon & White
- Athletics conference: UIL Class AAAA (4A)
- Mascot: Wildcat
- Website: Palestine High School

Palestine High School is a public high school located in Palestine, Texas (United States) and classified as a 4A school by the UIL. It is part of the Palestine Independent School District located in central Anderson County. The old Palestine High School built in 1915 is now The Museum for East Texas Culture. During 2023–2024, Palestine High School had an enrollment of 1,016 students and a student to teacher ratio of 12.81. The school received an overall rating of "B" from the Texas Education Agency for the 2024–2025 school year.

== Athletics ==
The Palestine Wildcats compete in the following sports

- Baseball
- Basketball
- Cross Country
- Football
- Golf
- Powerlifting
- Soccer
- Softball
- Tennis
- Track and Field
- Volleyball

=== State Titles ===
Palestine (UIL)

- Football
  - 1964 (3A)
- Boys Golf
  - 2005 (3A), 2006 (3A)
- Boys 4A Soccer 2016 state champ

Palestine Green Bay (PVIL)

- Boys Basketball
  - 1954 (PVIL-A), 1955 (PVIL-A)

== Notable alumni ==
- Bill Bradley, (b. 1947) is a former NFL Player and coach.
- Guy Brown, (b. 1955) is a former NFL linebacker for the Dallas Cowboys.
- Ivory Lee Brown, (b. 1969) is a former NFL running back for the Arizona Cardinals
- Russ Cotton, (1915–2009) was an NFL quarterback for the Pittsburgh Steelers
- John Gold, (b. 1988) is a former NFL punter
- Adrian Peterson, (b. 1985) is a former NFL running back
- James Saxton, (1940–2014) was an All-American NFL halfback for the Dallas Texans
- Todd Staples, (b. 1963) is the former two-term Texas Commissioner of Agriculture.
