= List of census-designated places in Texas =

Map of the United States with Texas highlighted

This article lists census-designated places (CDPs) in the U.S. state of Texas. Census-designated places (CDPs) are unincorporated communities lacking elected municipal officers and boundaries with legal status. The term "census-designated place" has been used as an official classification by the U.S. Census Bureau since 1980. Prior to that, select unincorporated communities were surveyed in the U.S. Census.

As of 2020 Census, there were a total of 637 census-designated places in Texas.

== Census-designated places ==
CDP and County seat
New CDPs (2020 Census)

CDP	County	Location of County	Population (2020)	Population (2010)	Population (2000)	Population (1990)	Population (1980)	Notes
Abram	Hidalgo		1,108	2,067	x	x	x	Formerly part of the Abram-Perezville CDP. Split for the 2010 census into two separate CDPs: Abram CDP and Perezville CDP
Acala	Hudspeth		11	x	x	x	x	
Agua Dulce	El Paso		3,218	3,014	738	x	x	
Aguilares	Webb		6	21	x	x	x	
Airport Heights	Starr		151	161	x	x	x	
Airport Road Addition	Brooks		96	96	132	x	x	
Alamo Beach	Calhoun		254	x	x	x	x	
Alanreed	Gray		23	x	x	x	x	
Aldine	Harris		15,999	15,869	13,979	11,133	12,623	
Alfred	Jim Wells		82	91	x	x	x	
Alice Acres	Jim Wells		465	490	491	x	x	
Allison	Wheeler		125	x	x	x	x	
Alto Bonito Heights	Starr		296	342	x	x	x	
Amada Acres	Starr		79	92	x	x	x	
Amargosa	Jim Wells		305	291	x	x	x	
Amaya	Zavala		108	93	x	x	x	
Amistad	Val Verde		24	53	x	x	x	
Anacua	Starr		24	12	x	x	x	
Arroyo Colorado Estates	Cameron		833	997	755	x	x	
Arroyo Gardens	Cameron		420	456	x	x	x	
Atascocita	Harris		88,174	65,844	35,757	x	x	
B and E	Starr		489	518	x	x	x	
Bacliff	Galveston		9,677	8,619	6,292	5,549	4,851	
Banquete	Nueces		745	726	x	x	x	
Barksdale	Edwards		91	x	x	x	x	
Barrera	Starr		122	108	x	x	x	
Barrett	Harris		5,223	3,199	2,872	3,052	3,183	Listed as an unincorporated place in the 1970 U.S. Census (pop 2,750) and the 1960 U.S. Census (pop 2,364).
Barton Creek	Travis		3,356	3,077	1,589	x	x	
Batesville	Zavala		787	1,068	1,298	1,313	x	
Bear Creek Ranch	Dallas		1,787	x	x	x	x	
Beauxart Gardens	Jefferson		1,064	x	x	x	x	
Beaver Creek	Burleson		910	x	x	x	x	
Belterra	Hays		6,170	x	x	x	x	
Ben Arnold	Milam		117	x	x	x	x	
Ben Bolt	Jim Wells		1,662	x	x	x	x	
Ben Wheeler	Van Zandt		456	x	x	x	x	
Benjamin Perez	Starr		29	34	x	x	x	
Big Thicket Lake Estates	Liberty; Polk		514	742	x	x	x	
Bigfoot	Frio		480	450	304	x	x	
Bivins	Cass		153	x	x	x	x	
Bixby	Cameron		352	504	356	x	x	
Bledsoe	Cochran		56	x	x	x	x	
Blessing	Matagorda		856	927	861	x	x	
Bloomington	Victoria		2,082	2,459	2,562	1,888	1,884	Listed as an unincorporated place in the 1960 U.S. census (1,756) and in the 1970 U.S. census (pop 1.676).
Blue Berry Hill	Bee		844	866	982	x	x	
Bluetown	Cameron		491	356	x	x	x	
Bluff Dale	Erath		151	x	x	x	x	
Boling	Wharton		930	1,122	x	x	x	
Bolivar Peninsula	Galveston		2,769	2,417	3,853	x	x	
Bonanza Hills	Webb		61	37	x	x	x	
Botines	Webb		149	117	132	x	x	
Box Canyon	Val Verde		29	34	x	x	x	
Boys Ranch	Oldham		173	282	x	x	x	
Brazos	Palo Pinto		112	x	x	x	x	
Briar	Parker; Tarrant; Wise		7,035	1,810	3,899	3,899	1,810	Listed as a city in the 1970 U.S. census (pop 630); disincorporated for the 1980 United States census
Briggs	Burnet		101	x	x	x	x	
Bristol	Ellis		714	668	x	x	x	
Brookston	Lamar		91	x	x	x	x	
Brundage	Dimmit		12	27	31	x	x	
Bruni	Webb		251	379	412	x	x	
Brushy Creek	Williamson		22,519	21,764	15,371	5,833	x	
Buchanan Dam	Llano		1,508	1,519	1,688	1,099	x	
Buchanan Lake Village	Llano		720	692	x	x	x	
Buena Vista	Starr		93	102	x	x	x	
Buna	Jasper		2,137	2,142	2,269	2,127	2,093	Listed as an unincorporated place (pop 1,649) in the 1970 U.S. census.
Burlington	Milam		81	x	x	x	x	
Bushland	Potter; Randall		2,234	x	x	x	x	
Butterfield	El Paso		100	114	61	x	x	
Cade Lakes	Burleson		507	x	x	x	x	
Callender Lake	Van Zandt		1,090	1,039	x	x	x	
Camargito	Starr		324	388	x	x	x	
Cameron Park	Cameron		6,099	6,963	5,961	3,802	x	
Camp Swift	Bastrop		7,943	6,383	4,731	2,681	x	
Campo Verde	Starr		111	132	x	x	x	
Cantu Addition	Brooks		191	188	217	x	x	
Canutillo	El Paso		6,212	6,321	5,129	4,442	x	
Canyon Creek	Hood		4,442	916	x	x	x	
Canyon Lake	Comal		31,124	21,262	16,870	9,975	x	
Cape Royale	San Jacinto		657	670	x	x	x	
Carlsbad	Tom Green		622	719	x	x	x	
Carlton	Hamilton		102	x	x	x	x	
Carrizo Hill	Dimmit		550	582	548	x	x	
Carter	Parker		1,637	x	x	x	x	
Casa Blanca	Starr		65	54	x	x	x	
Casas	Starr		29	39	x	x	x	
Catarina	Dimmit		70	118	135	x	x	
Cedar Creek	Bastrop		3,154	x	x	x	x	
Cedar Point	Polk		851	630	x	x	x	
Center Point	Kerr		1,263	x	x	x	x	
Central Gardens	Jefferson		4,373	4,347	4,106	4,026	x	
César Chávez	Hidalgo		1,608	1,929	1,469	x	x	
Channelview	Harris		45,688	38,289	29,865	25,564	17,471	
Chaparrito	Starr		142	114	x	x	x	
Chapeno	Starr		42	47	x	x	x	
Chilton	Falls		776	911	x	x	x	
China Spring	McLennan		1,436	1,281	x	x	x	
Christoval	Tom Green		482	504	422	x	x	
Chula Vista	Cameron		257	288	x	x	x	
Chula Vista	Maverick		5,100	3,818	3,400	x	x	
Chula Vista	Zavala		307	450	400	x	x	
Cienegas Terrace	Val Verde		3,025	3,424	x	x	x	
Cinco Ranch	Fort Bend; Harris		16,899	18,274	11,196	x	x	
Circle D-KC Estates	Bastrop		2,588	2,010	2,393	1,247	x	
Citrus City	Hidalgo		3,291	2,321	941	x	x	
Clay	Burleson		139	x	x	x	x	
Cloverleaf	Harris		24,100	22,942	23,508	18,230	17,317	
Colorado Acres	Webb		127	296	x	x	x	
Comfort	Kendall		2,211	2,363	2,358	1,477	1,226	
Concepcion	Duval		42	62	42	x	x	
Coyanosa	Pecos		155	163	138	x	x	
Coyote Acres	Jim Wells		570	508	389	x	x	
Crosby	Harris		3,417	2,299	1,714	1,811	1,533	First listed as an unincorporated community in the 1970 U.S. census (pop 1,118)
Cross Mountain	Bexar		3,944	3,124	1,524	1,112	x	
Cuevitas	Hidalgo		33	40	37	x	x	
Cumings	Fort Bend		2,207	981	683	x	x	
D'Hanis	Medina		785	847	x	x	x	
Damon	Brazoria		436	552	535	x	x	
Deanville	Burleson		63	x	x	x	x	
Deerwood	Montgomery		1,745	x	x	x	x	
Del Mar Heights	Cameron		78	133	259	x	x	
Del Sol	San Patricio		333	239	x	x	x	
Delmita	Starr		186	216	x	x	x	
Deweyville	Newton		571	1,023	1,190	1,218	1,171	
Dime Box	Lee		207	x	x	x	x	
Doffing	Hidalgo		5,618	5,091	4,256	x	x	
Doolittle	Hidalgo		4,061	2,769	2,358	x	x	
Driftwood	Hays		106	144	x	x	x	
East Alto Bonito	Starr		905	824	x	x	x	
East Columbia	Brazoria		128	x	x	x	x	
East Lopez	Starr		136	166	x	x	x	
Edgewater Estates	San Patricio		71	72	x	x	x	
Edroy	San Patricio		422	331	422	x	x	
Eidson Road	Maverick		9,461	8,960	9,348	x	x	
El Brazil	Starr		53	47	x	x	x	
El Camino Angosto	Cameron		186	253	254	x	x	
El Castillo	Starr		219	188	x	x	x	
El Cenizo	Starr		273	249	x	x	x	
El Chaparral	Starr		467	464	x	x	x	
El Indio	Maverick		182	190	263	x	x	
El Mesquite	Starr		50	38	x	x	x	
El Quiote	Starr		226	208	x	x	x	
El Rancho Vela	Starr		254	274	x	x	x	
El Refugio	Starr		407	331	221	x	x	
El Socio	Starr		104	130	x	x	x	
Elbert	Throckmorton		29	30	56	x	x	
Elias-Fela Solis	Starr		17	30	x	x	x	
Elm Creek	Maverick		2,884	2,469	1,928	x	x	
Elmo	Kaufman		803	768	x	x	x	
Emerald Bay	Smith		1,146	1,047	x	x	x	
Encantada-Ranchito-El Calaboz	Cameron		1,981	2,255	2,100	1,143	x	
Encino	Brooks		109	143	177	x	x	
Eugenio Saenz	Starr		182	159	x	x	x	
Evadale	Jasper		1,246	1,483	1,430	1,422	1,601	
Evergreen	Starr		80	73	x	x	x	
Fabens	El Paso		7,498	8,257	8,043	5,599	4,285	Listed as an unincorporated place in the 1970 U.S. census (pop 3,241) and the 1960 U.S. census (pop 3,134),
Fabrica	Maverick		772	923	x	x	x	
Falcon Heights	Starr		18	53	335	x	x	Prior to the 2010 U.S. census, four new CDPs were carved out from its territory (Falconaire, H. Cuellar Estates, Indio, Lago Vista) substantially reducing its population.
Falcon Lake Estates	Zapata		962	1,036	830	x	x	
Falcon Mesa	Zapata		523	405	506	x	x	
Falcon Village	Starr		3	47	78	x	x	
Falconaire	Starr		92	132	x	x	x	
Falman	San Patricio		60	76	x	x	x	
Fannett	Jefferson		2,363	2,252	x	x	x	
Farnsworth	Ochiltree		95	x	x	x	x	
Fernando Salinas	Starr		25	15	x	x	x	
Fifth Street	Fort Bend		2,284	2,486	2,059	x	x	
Flat	Coryell		157	x	x	x	x	
Flor del Rio	Starr		101	122	x	x	x	
Flowella	Brooks		117	118	134	x	x	
Fluvanna	Scurry		78	x	x	x	x	
Forest Heights	Orange		1,329	x	x	x	x	
Fort Bliss	El Paso		11,260	8,591	8,264	13,915	12,687	Listed as an unincorporated place in the 1970 U.S. census (pop. 13,288)
Fort Clark Springs	Kinney		1,215	1,228	x	x	x	
Fort Davis	Jeff Davis		1,024	1,201	1,050	x	x	
Fort Hancock	Hudspeth		1,052	1,750	1,713	x	x	
Fort Cavazos	Bell; Coryell		28,295	29,589	33,711	35,580	31,250	First appeared as an unincorporated community under the name Fort Hood in the 1970 U.S. census (pop 32,597). Renamed Fort Cavazos in 2023.
Four Corners	Fort Bend		12,103	12,382	2,954	x	x	
Four Points	Webb		10	18	x	x	x	
Fowlerton	La Salle		73	55	62	x	x	
Fresno	Fort Bend		24,486	19,069	6,603	3,182	x	
Fronton	Starr		172	180	599	x	x	
Fronton Ranchettes	Starr		174	113	x	x	x	
Gail	Borden		249	231	x	x	x	
Garceno	Starr		440	420	1,438	x	x	
Garciasville	Starr		43	46	x	x	x	
Garden City	Glasscock		334	334	x	x	x	
Gardendale	Ector		2,020	1,574	1,197	1,103	x	
Garfield	Travis		1,825	1,698	1,660	1,336	x	
Garner	Parker		397	x	x	x	x	
Garwood	Colorado		510	x	x	x	x	
Garza-Salinas II	Starr		651	719	x	x	x	
Gause	Milam; Robertson		275	x	x	x	x	
Geronimo	Guadalupe		1,097	1,032	619	x	x	
Girard	Kent		53	50	62	x	x	
Glazier	Hemphill		60	x	x	x	x	
Glidden	Colorado		741	661	x	x	x	
Grangerland	Montgomery		754	x	x	x	x	
Grape Creek	Tom Green		3,594	3,154	3,138	x	x	
Green Valley Farms	Cameron		655	1,272	697	x	x	
Guadalupe-Guerra	Starr		60	37	x	x	x	
Guerra	Jim Hogg		3	6	8	x	x	
Guthrie	King		151	160	x	x	x	
Gutierrez	Starr		69	79	x	x	x	
H. Cuellar Estates	Starr		11	20	x	x	x	
Hamshire	Jefferson		962	x	x	x	x	
Harding Gill Tract	Hidalgo		21	x	x	x	x	
Hargill	Hidalgo		800	877	x	x	x	
Harper	Gillespie		1,332	1,192	1,006	x	x	
Harrold	Wilbarger		87	x	x	x	x	
Hartley	Hartley		382	540	441	x	x	
Havana	Hidalgo		361	407	452	x	x	
Heartland	Kaufman		8,509	x	x	x	x	
Hebbronville	Jim Hogg		4,101	4,558	4,498	4,465	4,684	Listed as an unincorporated place in the 1970 U.S. census (pop 4,079), 1960 U.S. census (pop 3,987), and 1950 U.S. census (pop 3,947)
Heidelberg	Hidalgo		1,507	1,725	1,586	x	x	
Hermleigh	Scurry		383	345	393	x	x	
Highlands	Harris		8,612	7,522	7,089	6,632	6,467	First listed as an unincorporated place in the 1970 U.S. census (pop 3,462), the 1960 U.S. census (pop 4,336), and the 1950 U.S. census (pop 2,725).
Hillside Acres	Webb		3	30	x	x	x	
Hilltop	Frio		356	287	300	x	x	
Hilltop	Starr		120	77	x	x	x	
Hilltop Lakes	Leon		1,385	1,101	x	x	x	
Holiday Beach	Aransas		526	514	x	x	x	
Holly Lake Ranch	Wood		2,951	2,774	x	x	x	
Homestead Meadows North	El Paso		5,210	5,124	4,232	x	x	
Homestead Meadows South	El Paso		7,142	7,247	6,807	x	x	
Hornsby Bend	Travis		12,168	6,791	x	x	x	
Horseshoe Bend	Parker		949	789	x	x	x	
Huckabay	Erath		268	x	x	x	x	
Hudson Bend	Travis		4,005	2,981	2,369	x	x	
Hull	Liberty		522	669	x	x	x	
Hungerford	Wharton		390	347	645	x	x	
Iago	Wharton		148	161	x	x	x	
Iglesia Antigua	Cameron		415	413	x	x	x	
Imperial	Pecos		294	278	428	x	x	
Indian Hills	Hidalgo		2,694	2,591	2,036	x	x	
Indian Springs	Polk		892	785	x	x	x	
Indio	Starr		65	50	x	x	x	
Inez	Victoria		2,641	2,098	1,787	1,371	x	
J.F. Villarreal	Starr		82	104	x	x	x	
Jardin de San Julian	Starr		23	22	x	x	x	
Juarez	Cameron		642	1,017	x	x	x	
K-Bar Ranch	Jim Wells		375	358	350	x	x	
Kingsland	Llano		7,028	6,030	4,584	2,725	2,241	
Knippa	Uvalde		606	689	739	x	x	
Kopperl	Bosque		164	x	x	x	x	
La Blanca	Hidalgo		2,078	2,488	2,351	x	x	
La Carla	Starr		55	70	x	x	x	
La Casita	Starr		139	128	x	x	x	
La Chuparosa	Starr		74	49	x	x	x	
La Coma	Webb		7	48	x	x	x	
La Coma Heights	Hidalgo		116	x	x	x	x	
La Escondida	Starr		183	153	x	x	x	
La Esperanza	Starr		217	229	x	x	x	
La Feria North	Cameron		225	212	168	x	x	
La Homa	Hidalgo		11,267	11,985	10,433	1,403	x	
La Loma de Falcon	Starr		72	95	x	x	x	
La Minita	Starr		129	171	x	x	x	
La Moca Ranch	Webb		25	x	x	x	x	
La Paloma Addition	San Patricio		314	330	x	x	x	
La Paloma	Cameron		3,218	2,903	354	x	x	
La Paloma Ranchettes	Starr		329	239	x	x	x	
La Paloma-Lost Creek	Nueces		1,359	408	323	x	x	
La Presa	Webb		241	319	508	x	x	
La Pryor	Zavala		1,294	1,343	1,491	1,343	1,257	
La Puerta	Starr		638	632	1,636	x	x	Prior to the 2010 U.S. census, two new CDPs were carved out from its territory (B and E, Garza-Salinas II).
La Rosita	Starr		82	85	1,729	x	x	Prior to the 2010 U.S. census, ten new CDPs were carved out from its territory (Anacua, Campo Verde, El Cenizo, Hilltop, La Chuparosa, Los Barreras, Los Ebanos, Miguel Barrera, Rancho Viejo, and Tierra Dorada) substantially reducing its population.
La Tina Ranch	Cameron		687	618	x	x	x	
La Victoria	Starr		176	171	1,683	x	x	Prior to the 2010 U.S. census, six census-designated places (Alto Bonito Heights, El Castillo, El Socio, Eugenio Saenz, Olmito and Olmito, and Valle Vista) were carved out of its existing territory.
Lackland AFB	Bexar		9,467	9,918	7,123	9,352	14,459	Appeared as an unincorporated community in the 1970 U.S. census (pop 19,141).
Lago	Cameron		161	204	246	x	x	
Lago Vista	Starr		133	115	x	x	x	
Laguna Heights	Cameron		962	3,488	1,990	1,671	x	
Laguna Park	Bosque		1,372	1,276	x	x	x	
Laguna Seca	Hidalgo		232	266	251	x	x	
Lake Brownwood	Brown		1,462	1,532	1,694	1,221	x	
Lake Bryan	Brazos		2,060	1,728	x	x	x	
Lake Cherokee	Gregg; Rusk		2,980	3,071	x	x	x	
Lake Colorado City	Mitchell		636	588	x	x	x	
Lake Dunlap	Guadalupe		1,981	1,934	x	x	x	
Lake Kiowa	Cooke		2,254	1,906	1,883	x	x	
Lake Medina Shores	Bandera, Medina		1,110	1,235	x	x	x	
Lake Meredith Estates	Hutchinson		338	437	x	x	x	
Lake View	Val Verde		197	199	x	x	x	
Lakehills	Bandera		5,295	5,150	4,668	2,147	x	
Lakeshore Gardens-Hidden Acres	San Patricio		637	504	720	x	x	
Lamar	Aransas		724	636	x	x	x	
Lamkin	Comanche		46	x	x	x	x	
Lantana	Denton		10,785	6,874	x	x	x	
Laredo Ranchettes	Webb		21	22	1,845	x	x	Prior to the 2010 U.S. census, eight CDPS (La Coma, Laredo Ranchettes West, Los Altos, Ranchitos East, San Carlos I, San Carlos II, Tanquecitos South Acres, and Tanquecitos South Acres II) were carved out from its territory.
Laredo Ranchettes West	Webb		5	0	x	x	x	
Las Haciendas	Webb		2	7	x	x	x	
Las Lomas	Starr		3,054	3,147	2,684	x	x	
Las Lomitas	Jim Hogg		235	244	267	x	x	
Las Palmas	Zapata		59	67	x	x	x	
Las Palmas II	Cameron		891	1,605	x	x	x	
Las Pilas	Webb		7	28	x	x	x	
Las Quintas Fronterizas	Maverick		2,326	3,290	2,030	x	x	
Lasana	Cameron		104	84	135	x	x	
Lasara	Willacy		909	1,039	1,024	x	x	
Laughlin AFB	Val Verde		1,673	1,569	2,225	2,556	2,994	Listed as an unincorporated community (pop 3,458) in the 1970 U.S. census
Laureles	Cameron		4,111	3,692	3,285	x	x	
Lelia Lake	Donley		51	x	x	x	x	
Leming	Atascosa		841	946	x	x	x	
Liberty City	Gregg		2,721	2,351	1,935	1,607	x	
Lindsay	Reeves		452	271	394	x	x	
Lingleville	Erath		166	x	x	x	x	
Linn	Hidalgo		733	801	958	x	x	
Lipscomb	Lipscomb		66	37	44	x	x	
Little Cypress	Orange		1,968	x	x	x	x	
Llano Grande	Hidalgo		2,952	3,008	3,333	x	x	
Lockett	Wilbarger		173	x	x	x	x	
Lolita	Jackson		519	555	548	x	x	
Loma Grande	Zavala		135	107	x	x	x	
Loma Linda	San Patricio		149	122	x	x	x	
Loma Linda East	Jim Wells		305	254	214	x	x	
Loma Linda East	Starr		67	44	x	x	x	
Loma Linda West	Starr		98	114	x	x	x	
Loma Vista	Starr		117	160	x	x	x	
Longoria	Starr		81	92	x	x	x	
Loop	Gaines		216	225	x	x	x	
Lopeño	Zapata		70	174	140	x	x	
Lopezville	Hidalgo		2,367	4,333	4,476	2,827	x	
Los Altos	Webb		175	140	x	x	x	
Los Alvarez	Starr		247	303	1,434	x	x	Prior to the 2010 U.S. census 4 CDPs (Barrera, El Quiote, Flor del Rio, and Palo Blanco) were carved out from its territory.
Los Angeles	Willacy		108	121	86	x	x	Listed under the name Los Angeles Subdivision in the 2000 U.S. census
Los Arcos	Webb		83	127	x	x	x	
Los Arrieros	Starr		43	91	x	x	x	
Los Barreras	Starr		278	288	x	x	x	
Los Centenarios	Webb		49	87	x	x	x	
Los Corralitos	Webb		36	35	x	x	x	
Los Ebanos	Hidalgo		239	335	403	x	x	
Los Ebanos	Starr		281	280	x	x	x	
Los Fresnos	Webb		71	67	x	x	x	
Los Huisaches	Webb		15	17	x	x	x	
Los Lobos	Zapata		7	9	x	x	x	
Los Minerales	Webb		30	20	x	x	x	
Los Nopalitos	Webb		49	62	x	x	x	
Los Veteranos I	Webb		0	24	x	x	x	Formed from parts of the Ranchitos Las Lomas CDP prior to the 2010 census
Los Veteranos II	Webb		11	24	x	x	x	Formed from parts of the Botines CDP prior to the 2010 census
Lost Creek	Travis		1,276	4,509	4,729	4,095	x	
Louise	Wharton		889	995	997	x	x	
Loving	Young		143	x	x	x	x	
Lozano	Cameron		174	404	324	x	x	
Lyons	Burleson		236	x	x	x	x	
Macdona	Bexar		464	559	x	x	x	
Magnolia Beach	Calhoun		217	x	x	x	x	
Manchaca	Travis		2,266	1,133	x	x	x	
Manuel Garcia	Starr		204	203	x	x	x	
Manuel Garcia II	Starr		62	77	x	x	x	
Marathon	Brewster		410	430	455	x	x	
Markham	Matagorda		908	1,082	1,138	1,206	1,554	
Martinez	Starr		42	69	x	x	x	
Matagorda	Matagorda		313	503	x	x	x	
Mauriceville	Orange		2,983	3,252	2,743	2,046	x	
May	Brown		277	x	x	x	x	
McCaulley	Fisher		79	x	x	x	x	
McDade	Bastrop		720	685	x	x	x	
McKinney Acres	Andrews		852	815	x	x	x	
McLeod	Cass		311	x	x	x	x	
McQueeney	Guadalupe		2,397	2,545	2,527	2,063	1,332	
Medina	Zapata		3,953	3,935	2,960	x	x	
Mentone	Loving		22	19	x	x	x	
Mesquite	Starr		479	505	x	x	x	
Mi Ranchito Estate	Starr		409	281	x	x	x	
Midfield	Matagorda		356	x	x	x	x	
Midway North	Hidalgo		4,232	4,752	3,946	x	x	
Midway South	Hidalgo		2,307	2,239	1,711	x	x	
Miguel Barrera	Starr		132	128	x	x	x	
Mikes	Starr		942	910	x	x	x	
Mila Doce	Hidalgo		6,162	6,222	4,907	2,089	x	
Milam	Sabine		1,355	1,480	1,329	x	x	
Mirando City	Webb		222	375	493	x	x	
Mission Bend	Fort Bend; Harris		36,914	36,501	30,831	29,945	x	
Montague	Montague		261	304	x	x	x	
Monte Alto	Hidalgo		1,930	1,924	1,611	x	1,319	Monte Alto was deleted prior to the 1990 U.S. census but relisted in the 2000 U.S. census.
Moore	Frio		610	475	644	x	x	
Moraida	Starr		229	212	x	x	x	
Morales-Sanchez	Zapata		46	84	95	x	x	
Morgan Farm	San Patricio		573	463	484	x	x	
Morning Glory	El Paso		522	651	627	x	x	
Morse	Hansford		157	147	172	x	x	
Mosheim	Bosque		48	x	x	x	x	
Mound	Coryell		174	x	x	x	x	
Muniz	Hidalgo		1,593	1,370	1,106	x	x	
Murillo	Hidalgo		9,158	7,344	4,889	x	x	
Myra	Cooke		202	x	x	x	x	
Myrtle Springs	Van Zandt		954	828	x	x	x	
Nada	Colorado		231	x	x	x	x	
Narciso Pena	Starr		32	30	x	x	x	
Neches	Anderson		266	x	x	x	x	
Netos	Starr		18	31	x	x	x	
New Falcon	Zapata		117	191	184	x	x	
New Ulm	Austin		285	x	x	x	x	
Nina	Starr		124	141	x	x	x	
Nocona Hills	Montague		637	675	x	x	x	
Normandy	Maverick		54	x	x	x	x	
Normanna	Bee		98	113	121	x	x	
North Alamo	Hidalgo		3,722	3,235	2,061	x	x	
North Escobares	Starr		162	118	1,692	x	x	Prior to the 2010 census, part of North Escobares CDP was incorporated into Escobares city and parts were taken to form new CDPs (Escobar I, JF Villarreal CDP, Loma Vista CDP, Moraida CDP, Pena CDP, and Rivera CDP) and additional area was lost.
North Pearsall	Frio		739	614	561	x	x	
North San Pedro	Nueces		735	895	920	x	x	
Oak Island	Chambers		371	363	x	x	x	
Oak Trail Shores	Hood		2,979	2,755	2,475	1,750	x	
Oakhurst	San Jacinto		148	233	x	x	x	Oakhurst first appeared as a city in the 1990 U.S. census and as a census-designated place in the 2010 U.S. census.
Oilton	Webb		270	353	310	x	x	
Oklaunion	Wilbarger		88	x	x	x	x	
Olivarez	Hidalgo		4,248	3,827	2,445	x	x	
Olivia Lopez de Gutierrez	Starr		49	93	x	x	x	
Olmito and Olmito	Starr		276	271	x	x	x	
Olmito	Cameron		1,021	1,210	1,198	x	x	
Orason	Cameron		88	129	x	x	x	
Owl Ranch	Jim Wells		189	225	x	x	x	
Ozona	Crockett		2,663	3,225	3,436	3,181	3,766	Ozona first appeared as an unincorporated community in the 1950 U.S. census (pop 2,885), 1960 U.S. census (pop 3,361), and 1970 U.S. census (pop 2,864)
Pablo Pena	Starr		80	63	x	x	x	
Paige	Bastrop		278	x	x	x	x	
Paisano Park	San Patricio		96	130	x	x	x	
Palmer	Cameron		1,082	x	x	x	x	
Palmview South	Hidalgo		2,008	5,575	6,219	x	x	
Palo Blanco	Starr		238	204	x	x	x	
Palo Pinto	Palo Pinto		276	333	x	x	x	
Paloma Creek	Denton		3,177	2,501	x	x	x	
Paloma Creek South	Denton		9,539	2,753	x	x	x	
Pawnee	Bee		140	166	201	x	x	
Pecan Acres	Tarrant; Wise		4,808	4,099	2,289	1,587	1,113	
Pecan Grove	Fort Bend		22,782	15,963	13,551	9,502	x	
Pecan Plantation	Hood; Johnson		6,236	5,294	3,544	x	x	
Pena	Starr		73	118	x	x	x	
Pendleton	Bell		845	x	x	x	x	
Perezville	Hidalgo		2,685	5,376	x	x	x	Formerly part of the Abram-Perezville CDP. Split for the 2010 census into two separate CDPs: Abram CDP and Perezville CDP
Perrin	Jack		346	398	x	x	x	
Pettus	Bee		449	558	608	x	x	
Petty	Lamar		140	x	x	x	x	
Pine Harbor	Marion		785	810	x	x	x	
Pinebrook	Grimes		485	x	x	x	x	
Pinehurst	Montgomery		5,195	4,624	4,266	3,284	x	
Pinewood Estates	Hardin		1,641	1,678	1,633	1,174	x	
Placedo	Victoria		625	692	x	x	x	
Pleasant Hill	Polk		610	522	x	x	x	
Plum	Fayette		366	x	x	x	x	
Port Mansfield	Willacy		319	226	415	x	x	
Port O'Connor	Calhoun		954	1,253	x	x	1,031	First appeared as a census-designated place in the 1980 United States census. It was deleted prior to the 1990 U.S. census; and relisted as a CDP in the 2010 U.S. census.
Porter Heights	Montgomery		1,903	1,653	1,490	1,448	1,331	
Potosi	Taylor		3,947	2,991	1,664	1,441	x	
Powderly	Lamar		1,261	636	x	x	x	
Prado Verde	El Paso		209	246	200	x	x	
Praesel	Milam		446	x	x	x	x	
Preston	Grayson		2,101	2,096	x	x	x	
Priddy	Mills		150	x	x	x	x	
Proctor	Comanche		93	x	x	x	x	
Pueblo East	Webb		1	0	x	x	x	Formed from parts of the Ranchitos Las Lomas CDP prior to the 2010 census
Pueblo Nuevo	Webb		432	521	x	x	x	
Quail	Collingsworth		17	19	33	x	x	
Quail Creek	Victoria		1,800	1,628	x	x	x	
Quemado	Maverick		162	230	243	x	x	
Quesada	Starr		7	25	x	x	x	
Radar Base	Maverick		93	762	162	x	x	
Rafael Pena	Starr		16	17	x	x	x	
Ramireno	Zapata		6	35	x	x	x	
Ramirez-Perez	Starr		66	78	x	x	x	
Ramos	Starr		144	116	x	x	x	
Ranchette Estates	Willacy		106	152	133	x	x	
Ranchitos del Norte	Starr		214	112	x	x	x	
Ranchitos East	Webb		189	212	x	x	x	
Ranchitos Las Lomas	Webb		167	266	334	x	x	
Rancho Alegre	Jim Wells		1,415	1,704	1,775	x	x	
Rancho Banquete	Nueces		459	424	469	x	x	
Rancho Chico	San Patricio		387	396	309	x	x	
Rancho Viejo	Starr		233	228	x	x	x	
Ranchos Penitas West	Webb		466	573	520	x	x	
Randolph AFB	Bexar		1,280	1,241	x	x	x	
Ratamosa	Cameron		197	254	218	x	x	
Realitos	Duval		121	184	209	x	x	
Red Rock	Bastrop		410	x	x	x	x	
Redfield	Nacogdoches		392	441	x	x	x	
Redford	Presidio		43	90	132	x	x	
Redland	Angelina		1,088	1,047	x	x	x	
Redwood	Guadalupe		4,003	4,338	3,586	x	x	
Regino Ramirez	Starr		120	85	x	x	x	
Reid Hope King	Cameron		667	786	802	x	x	
Relampago	Hidalgo		129	132	104	x	x	
Rendon	Tarrant		13,533	12,552	9,022	7,658	x	
Ricardo	Kleberg		1,075	1,048	x	x	x	
Rice Tracts	Cameron		733	x	x	x	x	
Richards	Grimes		184	x	x	x	x	
Ringgold	Montague		146	x	x	x	x	
Rivereno	Starr		62	61	x	x	x	
Riviera	Kleberg		609	689	x	x	x	
Rochelle	McCulloch		169	x	x	x	x	
Rock Island	Colorado		228	x	x	x	x	
Rockwell Place	Randall		1,811	x	x	x	x	
Rosanky	Bastrop		1,473	x	x	x	x	
Rosharon	Brazoria		1,362	1,152	x	x	x	
Rosita	Maverick		3,501	2,704	2,574	x	x	
Rowena	Runnels		305	x	x	x	x	
Salida del Sol Estates	Hidalgo		6,496	x	x	x	x	
Salineño	Starr		176	201	304	x	x	
Salineño North	Starr		117	115	x	x	x	
Sam Rayburn	Jasper		1,273	1,181	x	x	x	
Sammy Martinez	Starr		123	110	x	x	x	
Samnorwood	Collingsworth		24	39	51	x	x	
San Carlos	Hidalgo		3,087	3,130	2,650	x	x	
San Carlos I	Webb		187	316	x	x	x	
San Carlos II	Webb		220	261	x	x	x	
San Fernando	Starr		49	68	x	x	x	
San Isidro	Starr		187	240	270	x	x	
San Juan	Starr		203	129	x	x	x	Carved out from part of the Garceno CDP prior to the 2010 U.S. census
San Leon	Galveston		6,135	4,970	4,365	3,328	x	
San Pedro	Cameron		442	530	668	x	x	
San Ygnacio	Zapata		504	667	853	x	x	
Sand Springs	Howard		878	835	x	x	x	
Sanderson	Terrell		664	837	861	1,126	1,241	First appeared as a census-designated place in the 1970 U.S. census (pop 1,229)
Sandia	Jim Wells		326	379	431	x	x	
Sandoval	Starr		37	32	x	x	x	
Sandy Hollow-Escondidas	Nueces		342	296	433	x	x	
Santa Anna	Starr		12	13	x	x	x	
Santa Cruz	Starr		74	54	x	x	x	
Santa Maria	Cameron		651	733	846	x	x	
Santa Monica	Willacy		86	83	78	x	x	
Santa Rita Ranch	Williamson		3,152	x	x	x	x	
Santa Rosa	Starr		265	241	x	x	x	
Santel	Starr		24	44	x	x	x	
Santo	Palo Pinto		347	x	x	x	x	
Sargent	Matagorda		1,212	x	x	x	x	
Sarita	Kenedy		205	238	x	x	x	
Savannah	Denton		6,529	3,318	x	x	x	
Scenic Oaks	Bexar		10,458	4,957	3,279	2,352	x	
Scissors	Hidalgo		3,758	3,186	2,805	1,513	x	
Sebastian	Willacy		1,684	1,917	1,864	1,598	x	
Seco Mines	Maverick		572	560	x	x	x	
Seis Lagos	Collin		1,450	x	x	x	x	
Serenada	Williamson		2,098	1,641	1,847	3,242	x	
Seth Ward	Hale		1,603	2,025	1,926	1,402	1,186	
Shady Hollow	Travis		4,822	5,004	5,140	x	x	
Shadybrook	Cherokee		2,400	1,967	x	x	x	
Sheffield	Pecos		174	x	x	x	x	
Shelbyville	Shelby		100	x	x	x	x	
Sheldon	Harris		2,361	1,990	1,831	1,653	2,031	First appeared as a census-designated place in the 1970 U.S. census (pop 1,665)
Sheridan	Colorado		520	x	x	x	x	
Sherwood Shores	Grayson		1,165	1,190	x	x	x	
Shiro	Grimes		201	x	x	x	x	
Sienna	Fort Bend		20,204	x	x	x	x	
Sierra Blanca	Hudspeth		315	553	533	x	x	
Siesta Acres	Maverick		1,866	1,885	x	x	x	
Siesta Shores	Zapata		1,450	1,382	890	x	x	
Skidmore	Bee		863	925	1,013	x	x	
Solis	Cameron		722	512	545	x	x	
Sonterra	Williamson		7,679	x	x	x	x	
South Alamo	Hidalgo		3,414	3,361	3,101	x	x	
South Fork Estates	Jim Hogg		136	70	47	x	x	
South La Paloma	Jim Wells		347	345	x	x	x	
South Point	Cameron		1,014	1,376	1,118	x	x	
South Toledo Bend	Newton		434	576	524	x	x	
Southwest Sandhill	Ward		1,666	x	x	x	x	
Spade	Lamb		71	73	100	x	x	
Sparks	El Paso		4,760	4,529	2,974	1,276	x	
Spring	Harris		62,559	54,298	36,385	33,111	x	
Spring Gardens	Nueces		497	563	x	x	x	
St. Paul	San Patricio		608	584	542	x	x	
Steiner Ranch	Travis		16,713	x	x	x	x	
Stonewall	Gillespie		451	505	469	x	x	
Stowell	Chambers		1,743	1,756	1,572	1,419	1,498	
Study Butte	Brewster		200	233	x	x	x	
Summerfield	Castro		34	x	x	x	x	
Sunrise Shores	Henderson		598	x	x	x	x	
Sunset Acres	Webb		4	23	x	x	x	
Sunset	Montague		543	497	339	x	x	Sunset appeared as a city in the 2000 U.S. census (pop 339) and was redesignated as a census-designated place in the 2010 U.S. census.
Sunset	Starr		34	47	x	x	x	
Sylvester	Fisher		52	x	x	x	x	
Taft Southwest	San Patricio		1,296	1,460	1,721	2,012	x	Not listed in the 1980 U.S. census. Listed as an unincorporated place in the 1970 U.S. census (pop 2,026) 1960 U.S. census (pop 1,927).
Tanquecitos South Acres	Webb		229	233	x	x	x	
Tanquecitos South Acres II	Webb		60	50	x	x	x	
Terlingua	Brewster		78	58	x	x	x	
The Homesteads	Johnson		3,890	x	x	x	x	
The Woodlands	Montgomery; Harris		114,436	93,847	55,649	29,205	8,443	
Thompsonville	Jim Hogg		26	46	x	x	x	
Thunderbird Bay	Brown		764	663	x	x	x	
Tierra Bonita	Cameron		179	141	160	x	x	
Tierra Dorada	Starr		29	28	x	x	x	
Tierra Grande	Nueces		303	403	362	x	x	
Tierra Verde	Nueces		298	277	x	x	x	
Tilden	McMullen		190	261	x	x	x	
Timberwood Park	Bexar		35,217	13,447	5,889	2,578	x	
Tivoli	Refugio		419	479	x	x	x	
Tornillo	El Paso		1,432	1,568	1,609	x	x	
Tow	Llano		226	x	x	x	x	
Tradewinds	San Patricio		160	180	163	x	x	
Travis Ranch	Kaufman		7,324	2,556	x	x	x	
Tuleta	Bee		231	288	292	x	x	
Tulsita	Bee		31	14	20	x	x	
Tunis	Burleson		90	x	x	x	x	
Tynan	Bee		254	278	301	x	x	
Umbarger	Randall		123	x	x	x	x	
Utopia	Uvalde		225	227	241	x	x	
Uvalde Estates	Uvalde		1,879	2,171	1,879	x	x	
Val Verde Park	Val Verde		2,332	2,384	x	x	x	
Valera	Coleman		94	x	x	x	x	
Valle Hermoso	Starr		93	0	x	x	x	
Valle Verde	Webb		0	0	x	x	x	
Valle Vista	Starr		545	469	x	x	x	
Van Vleck	Matagorda		1,923	1,844	1,411	1,534	1,157	Listed as an unincorporated place (pop 1,051) in the 1970 U.S. census.
Vanderbilt	Jackson		409	395	411	x	x	
Victoria Vera	Starr		93	110	x	x	x	
Villa del Sol	Cameron		153	175	132	x	x	
Villa Pancho	Cameron		467	788	386	x	x	
Villa Verde	Hidalgo		711	874	891	x	x	
Villarreal	Starr		112	131	x	x	x	
Wadsworth	Matagorda		302	x	x	x	x	
Waka	Ochiltree		50	x	x	x	x	
Warren	Tyler		677	757	x	x	x	
Washburn	Armstrong		116	x	x	x	x	
Welch	Dawson		234	222	x	x	x	
Wells Branch	Travis		14,000	12,120	11,271	7,094	x	
West Alto Bonito	Starr		615	696	569	x	x	
West Livingston	Polk		8,156	8,071	6,612	x	x	
West Odessa	Ector		33,340	22,707	17,799	16,566	x	
West Sharyland	Hidalgo		2,004	2,309	2,947	x	x	
Westdale	Jim Wells		325	372	295	x	x	
Western Lake	Parker		1,762	1,525	x	x	x	
Westminster	Collin		1,035	861	x	x	x	Westminster first appeared as a town in the 1920 U.S. census; and after disincorporation was listed as a census-designated place in the 2010 U.S. census.
Westway	El Paso		3,811	4,188	3,829	2,381	x	
Westwood Shores	Trinity		1,239	1,162	x	x	x	
Whitharral	Hockley		119	x	x	x	x	
Wild Peach Village	Brazoria		2,329	2,452	2,498	2,440	2,385	
Wildorado	Oldham		201	x	x	x	x	
Wildwood	Hardin; Tyler		1,121	1,235	x	x	x	
Willow Grove	McLennan		2,082	x	x	x	x	
Wingate	Runnels		83	x	x	x	x	
Winnie	Chambers		3,162	3,254	2,914	2,238	2,496	Listed as an unincorporated place in the 1970 U.S. Census (pop 1,114) and the 1960 U.S. Census (pop 1,543).
Wyldwood	Bastrop		3,694	2,505	2,310	1,764	x	
Yancey	Medina		300	x	x	x	x	
Yznaga	Cameron		108	91	103	x	x	
Zapata	Zapata		5,383	5,089	4,856	7,119	3,831	Listed as an unincorporated place in the 1970 U.S. census (pop 2,102), 1960 U.S. census (pop 2,031), and 1950 U.S. census (pop 1,400)
Zapata Ranch	Willacy		87	108	88	x	x	
Zarate	Starr		79	59	x	x	x	
Zephyr	Brown		179	x	x	x	x	
Zuehl	Guadalupe		399	346	376	x	x	

== Former Census-Designated Places ==
CDP	County	Location of County	Population (2020)	Population (2010)	Population (2000)	Population (1990)	Population (1980)	Notes
Abram-Perezville	Hidalgo		x	x	5,376	3,999	x	Split for the 2010 census into two separate CDPs: Abram CDP and Perezville CDP
Alfred-South La Paloma	Travis		x	x	451	x	x	Split into the Alfred and South La Paloma CDPs prior to the 2010 U.S. census
Alton North	Hidalgo		x	x	5,051	x	x	Absorbed by the city of Alton prior to the 2010 U.S. census
Anderson Mill	Travis; Williamson		x	x	8,953	9,468	x	Absorbed into the city of Austin after the 2010 census
Arroyo Gardens-La Tina Ranch	Cameron		x	x	732	x	x	Split for the 2010 census into two separate CDPs: Arroyo Gardens CDP and La Tina Ranch CDP
Bluetown-Iglesia Antigua	Cameron		x	x	692	x	x	Split for the 2010 census into two separate CDPs: Bluetown CDP and Iglesia Antigua CDP
Boling-Iago	Wharton		x	x	1,271	1,119	1,348	Split for the 2010 census into two separate CDPs: Boling CDP and Iago CDP
Box Canyon-Amistad	Val Verde		x	x	76	x	x	Split for the 2010 census into two separate CDPs: Amistad CDP and Box Canyon CDP
Chula Vista-Orason	Cameron		x	x	394	x	x	Split for the 2010 census into two separate CDPs: Chula Vista CDP and Orason CDP
Country Acres	San Patricio		163	185	x	x	x	Annexed by the city of Aransas Pass in 2022.
Coyote Flats	Johnson		x	312	x	x	x	Incorporated in 2010.
Del Sol-Loma Linda	San Patricio		x	x	726	x	x	Split for the 2010 census into three separate CDPs: Del Sol CDP, Loma Linda CDP, and the La Paloma Addition CDP
Dennis	Parker		727	x	x	x	x	Listed as a CDP in 2020 and then incorporated in 2023.
Dominion	Bexar		x	x	x	1,196	x	Absorbed into San Antonio prior to the 2000 census
Doyle	San Patricio		x	254	285	x	x	Annexed by the city of Portland prior to the 2020 U.S. census
Eagle Mountain	Tarrant		x	x	6,599	5,847	x	Absorbed into the city of Saginaw prior to the 2010 census
East Bernard	Wharton		x	x	1,729	1,544	1,735	First appeared as an unincorporated place in the 1970 U.S. census (pop 1,159); Incorporated prior to the 2010 census
Edgewater-Paisano	San Patricio		x	x	182	x	x	Split for the 2010 census into two separate CDPs: Edgewater Estates CDP and Paisano Park CDP
Escobares	Starr		x	x	x	1,544	1,705	Although officially incorporated in 2005, Escobares was listed as a city in the 2000 census
Escobar I	Starr		x	324	x	x	x	Escobar I was formed prior to the 2010 U.S. census along with JF Villarreal CDP, Loma Vista CDP, Moraida CDP, Pena CDP, and Rivera CDP from parts of North Escobares CDP that was not incorporated into the city of Escobares. It was absorbed by the city of Escobares prior to the 2020 U.S. census and delisted as a CDP.
Falman-County Acres	San Patricio		x	x	289	x	x	Split for the 2010 census into two separate CDPs: Falman CDP and Country Acres CDP
Faysville	Hidalgo		x	439	348	x	x	Absorbed by the city of Edinburg prior to the 2020 U.S. census.
First Colony	Fort Bend		x	x	x	18,327	x	Absorbed into the cities of Sugar Land and Missouri City prior to the 2000 census
Grand Acres	Cameron		x	49	203	x	x	Part absorbed by the town of Santa Rosa prior to the 2010 U.S. census. Deleted prior to the 2020 U.S. census
Homestead Meadows	El Paso		x	x	x	4,978	x	Split into the Homestead Meadows North CDP and Homestead Meadows South CDP
Horseshoe Bay	Burnet, Llano		x	x	3,337	1,546	x	Incorporated in 2006 prior to the 2010 U.S. census
Ingram	Kerr		x	x	x	x	1,921	Incorporated prior to the 1990 U.S. census
Jollyville	Travis; Williamson		x	16,151	15,813	15,206	x	Absorbed into the city of Austin after the 2010 census
Kingwood	Harris; Montgomery		x	x	x	37,397	16,261	Absorbed into the city of Houston prior to the 2000 census
La Casita-Garciasville	Starr		x	x	2,177	1,186	x	Broken up prior to the 2010 census to form the CDPs of Amada Acres, Chaparrito, La Casita, Loma Linda East, Manuel Garcia, Manuel Garcia II, Olivia Lopez de Gutierrez, Ramirez-Perez and Victoria Vera.
Las Colonias	Zavala		x	x	283	x	x	Deleted prior to the 2010 U.S. census with the Amaya and Loma Grande CDPs formed out of parts of its territory
Las Milpas-Hidalgo Park	Hidalgo		x	x	x	x	3,039	Annexed by the city of Pharr prior to the 1990 U.S. census.
Larga Vista	Webb		x	x	742	x	x	Absorbed into Laredo prior to the 2010 U.S. census
Las Palmas-Juarez	Cameron		x	x	1,666	x	x	Split for the 2010 census into two separate CDPs: Las Palmas II CDP and La Juarez CDP
Los Villareales	Starr		x	x	930	x	x	Deleted prior to the 2010 U.S. census after part was annexed to Rio Grande City and the remainder was used to form the CDPs of La Escondida, La Esperanza, and Santel and parts of the CDPs of Mi Ranchito Estate and Ranchitos del Norte.
Northcliff	Guadalupe		x	x	1,819	x	x	Absorbed into the city of Schertz prior to the 2020 census
Northridge	Starr		x	78	x	x	x	Absorbed into the city of Roma prior to the 2020 census
Old Escobares	Starr		x	97	x	x	x	Old Escobares was formed along with Mesquite CDP from the part of the Escobares CDP that was not incorporated into the city of Escobares. It was absorbed by the city of Escobares prior to the 2020 U.S. census and delisted as a CDP.
Onion Creek	Travis		x	x	2,116	1,544		Absorbed into the city of Austin after the 2000 census
Owl Ranch-Amargosa	Jim Wells		x	x	451	x	x	Split for the 2010 census into two separate CDPs: Owl Ranch CDP and Amargosa CDP
Penitas	Hidalgo		x	x	x	1,077	x	Incorporated prior to the 2000 census
Phillips	Hutchinson		x	x	x	x	1,729	Deleted prior to the 1990 U.S. census after the city was dissolved due to a refinery explosion. Listed as an unincorporated community in the 1950 U.S. census (Pop 4,105), the 1960 U.S. census (pop 3,605), and the 1970 U.S. census (Pop 2,515).
Presidio	Presidio		x	x	x	x	1,723	Incorporated prior to the 1990 census
Progreso	Hidalgo		x	x	x	1,951	1,436	Incorporated prior to the 2000 census
Providence	Denton		x	4,786	x	x	x	Incorporated as Providence Village prior to the 2020 census
Reese AFB	Lubbock		x	x	x	1,263	1,934	Listed as an unincorporated area in the 1970 U.S. census (pop 2,545). The CDP was deleted prior to the 2000 U.S. census after the air base was closed in 1997; and the Reese Center CDP was formed out of part of its area.
Reese Center	Lubbock		x	x	42	x	x	Dissolved prior to the 2010 census
Rio Grande City	Starr		x	x	x	9,891	8,930	Incorporated prior to the 2000 U.S. census. Listed as an unincorporated community in the 1970 U.S. census (Pop 5,676), the 1960 U.S. census (Pop 5,835), and the 1950 U.S. census (Pop 3,992).
Rivera	Starr		x	162	x	x	x	Rivera was formed prior to the 2010 U.S. census along with JF Villarreal CDP, Loma Vista CDP, Moraida CDP, Pena CDP, and Escobar I CDP from parts of North Escobares CDP that was not incorporated into the city of Escobares. It was mostly absorbed by the city of Roma prior to the 2020 U.S. census and delisted as a CDP.
Roma Creek	Starr		x	350	610	x	x	Prior to the 2010 U.S. census, portions of Roma Creek were annexed to the city of Roma and parts were taken to form three new CDPs (Evergreen, Fronton Ranchettes, and Ramos). The remainder was absorbed by the city of Roma prior to the 2020 U.S. census.
Salado	Bell		x	x	3,475	1,216	1,035	Incorporated prior to the 2010 U.S. census.
San Elizario	El Paso		x	x	x	4,385	1,548	Incorporated prior to the 2000 census
Santa Cruz	Starr		x	x	630	x	x	Split for the 2010 U.S. census into two separate CDPs: El Chaparral and Santa Rosa. A new CDP of the same name (Santa Cruz CDP) was created that does not contain any part of the old CDP.
South San Pedro	Nueces		x	x	x	x	1,688	Appeared as an unincorporated community in the 1970 U.S. census (Pop 3,065). Deleted prior to the 1990 U.S. census
Spring Garden-Terra Verde	Nueces		x	x	693	x	x	Split for the 2010 census into two separate CDPs: Spring Gardens CDP and Tierra Verde CDP
Study Butte-Terlingua	Brewster		x	x	267	x	x	Split for the 2010 U.S. census into two separate CDPs: Study Butte and Terlingua
Sullivan City	Hidalgo		x	x	x	2,371	x	Incorporated prior to the 2000 census
Tanglewood Forest	Travis		x	x	x	2,941	x	Absorbed into the city of Austin before the 2000 census
Town West	Fort Bend		x	x	x	6,166	x	Dissolved prior to the 2000 census although remains an active community
Wimberley	Hays		x	x		2,403		Incorporated prior to the 2010 census
Windemere	Travis		x	1,037		3,207		Absorbed into the city of Pflugerville before the 2020 census

== See also ==
- List of counties in Texas
- List of municipalities in Texas
- List of unincorporated communities in Texas
- List of ghost towns in Texas
- Administrative divisions of Texas
