= Rio Grande City Grulla Independent School District =

School district in Texas, United States

Address
- 1 South Fort Ringgold Rio Grande City, Texas, 78582; United States

District information
- Grades: PK–12
- Schools: 15
- NCES District ID: 4837140

Students and staff
- Students: 9,482 (2023–2024)
- Teachers: 722.36 (on an FTE basis)
- Student–teacher ratio: 13.13:1

Other information
- Website: www.myrgcgisd.org

Rio Grande City Grulla Independent School District (RGCGISD), formerly Rio Grande City Consolidated Independent School District, is a public school district based in Rio Grande City, Texas (USA).

In 2009, the school district was "recognized" by the Texas Education Agency.

== Catchment area ==
The district serves communities in southeastern Starr County including the cities of Rio Grande City and La Grulla, and several census-designated places. Census-designated places served by RGCCISD include:

- Airport Heights
- Alto Bonito Heights
- Amada Acres
- Barrera (portion)
- B and E
- Buena Vista
- Camargito
- Casa Blanca
- Chaparrito
- East Alto Bonito
- East Lopez
- El Brazil
- El Castillo
- El Chaparral
- El Mesquite
- El Rancho Vela
- El Refugio
- El Socio
- Elias-Fela Solis
- Eugenio Saenz
- Fernando Salinas
- Garciasville
- Garza-Salinas II
- Gutierrez
- La Carla
- La Casita
- La Escondida
- La Paloma Ranchettes
- La Puerta
- La Victoria
- Las Lomas
- Loma Linda East
- Longoria
- Los Alvarez (eastern half)
- Manuel Garcia
- Manuel Garcia II
- Martinez
- Mi Ranchito Estate
- Mikes
- Narciso Pena
- Netos
- Nina
- Olivia Lopez de Gutierrez
- Olmito and Olmito
- Pablo Pena
- Quesada
- Ramirez-Perez
- Ranchitos del Norte
- Rivereno
- Sammy Martinez
- San Fernando
- Santa Cruz
- Santa Rosa
- Santel
- Valle Hermoso
- Valle Vista
- Victoria Vera
- Villarreal
- West Alto Bonito (formerly Alto Bonito)
- Zarate

In regards to former CDPs:

Formerly Garciasville and La Casita were one CDP, La Casita-Garciasville.

Other former CDPs:

- Former El Refugio
- Former La Puerta
- Former Santa Cruz
- Los Alvarez (partial)
- Los Villareales (most)

== Schools ==
There are 14 schools in the Rio Grande Consolidated ISD.

=== High School (Grades 9-12) ===
- Grulla High School
- Rio Grande City High School
- Preparatory For Early College High School

=== Middle Schools (Grades 6-8) ===
- Grulla Middle School
- In 2022 the district was constructing a $36,200,000 replacement facility, which is to have 143,000 square feet (13,300 m^{2}) of space.
- Ringgold Middle School
- Veterans Middle School
- Academy For Academic Enrichment Middle School

=== Elementary Schools (Grades PK-5) ===
- Alto Bonito Elementary School
- Roque Guerra Jr. Elementary School
- Grulla Elementary School
- John & Olive Hinojosa Elementary School
- La Union Elementary School
- North Grammar Elementary School
- Dr. Mario E. Ramirez Elementary School
- Ringgold Elementary School
- General Ricardo Sanchez Elementary School
- Academy for Academic Enhancement Elementary
