= Viboras, Texas =

Ghost town in Texas, US

- Ghost town
- Location in Texas
- Coordinates: 26.717276°N 98.82725°W
- Country: United States
- State: Texas
- County: Starr

Viboras, Texas is a ghost town in Starr County, Texas.

== History ==
Viboras was founded in 1753 along Los Olmos Creek by settlers brought to the area by governor of Nuevo Santander José de Escandón. The name of the town means "snakes" in Spanish. The town depopulated in the late 20th century.

== See also ==
- List of ghost towns in Texas
