= East Lopez, Texas =

- CDP
- Interactive map of East Lopez, Texas
- Coordinates: 26°18′31″N 98°38′16″W
- Country: United States
- State: Texas
- County: Starr

Population (2020)
  - Total: 136
- Time zone: UTC-6 (Central (CST))
  - Summer (DST): UTC-5 (CDT)
- Zip Code: 78582

East Lopez is a census-designated place (CDP) in Starr County, Texas, United States. This was a new CDP for the 2010 census, with a population of 166.

== Geography ==
East Lopez is located at 26°18′31″N 98°38′16″W (26.308661, -98.637851).

== Demographics ==
Historical population
| Census | Pop. | Note | %± |
|---|---|---|---|
| 2010 | 166 | | — |
| 2020 | 136 | | −18.1% |
U.S. Decennial Census; 1850–1900 1910; 1920 1930 1940; 1950 1960 1970; 1980 1990 2000; 2010 2020

East Lopez first appeared as a census designated place in the 2010 U.S. census. The CDP's name was changed from "East Lopez" to "E. Lopez" prior to the 2020 U.S. census.

=== 2020 census ===
E. Lopez CDP, Texas – Racial and ethnic composition Note: the US Census treats Hispanic/Latino as an ethnic category. This table excludes Latinos from the racial categories and assigns them to a separate category. Hispanics/Latinos may be of any race.
| Race / Ethnicity (NH = Non-Hispanic) | Pop 2010 | Pop 2020 | % 2010 | % 2020 |
|---|---|---|---|---|
| White alone (NH) | 0 | 0 | 0.00% | 0.00% |
| Black or African American alone (NH) | 0 | 0 | 0.00% | 0.00% |
| Native American or Alaska Native alone (NH) | 0 | 0 | 0.00% | 0.00% |
| Asian alone (NH) | 0 | 0 | 0.00% | 0.00% |
| Pacific Islander alone (NH) | 0 | 0 | 0.00% | 0.00% |
| Some Other Race alone (NH) | 0 | 0 | 0.00% | 0.00% |
| Mixed Race or Multi-Racial (NH) | 0 | 0 | 0.00% | 0.00% |
| Hispanic or Latino (any race) | 166 | 136 | 100.00% | 100.00% |
| Total | 166 | 136 | 100.00% | 100.00% |

== Education ==
The CDP is within the Rio Grande City Grulla Independent School District (formerly Rio Grande City Consolidated Independent School District)
