= Starr County, Texas =

County in Texas, United States

- County
- The Starr County Courthouse in Rio Grande City

- Seal

- Location within the U.S. state of Texas
- Coordinates: 26°34′N 98°44′W
- Country: United States
- State: Texas
- Founded: 1848
- Named for: James Harper Starr
- Seat: Rio Grande City
- Largest city: Rio Grande City

Government
  - Sheriff: Rene "Orta" Fuentes

Area
  - Total: 1,229 sq mi (3,180 km^{2})
  - Land: 1,223 sq mi (3,170 km^{2})
  - Water: 88.5 sq mi (229 km^{2}) 0.5%

Population (2020)
  - Total: 65,920
  - Estimate (2025): 66,319 ▲
  - Density: 53.90/sq mi (20.81/km^{2})
- Time zone: UTC−6 (Central)
  - Summer (DST): UTC−5 (CDT)
- Congressional district: 28th
- Website: www.co.starr.tx.us

Starr County is located in the U.S. state of Texas. As of the 2020 census, its population was 65,920. Its county seat is Rio Grande City. The county was created in 1848. It is named for James Harper Starr, who served as secretary of the treasury of the Republic of Texas.

Starr County comprises the Rio Grande City micropolitan statistical area, which also includes other small cities, which itself is part of the larger Rio Grande Valley region. It is directly northeast of the Mexican border.

The county population is almost entirely Hispanic or Latino, with 97.6% of its population identifying as such. It is the county with the highest proportion of Hispanics in the continental United States. It had continuously voted Democratic for president between 1896 and 2020, but flipped Republican in 2024.

== History ==
From 2000 to 2010, the population of Starr County increased from 53,597 to 60,968.

== Geography ==
According to the U.S. Census Bureau, the county has a total area of 1,229 square miles (3,180 km^{2}), of which 5.9 square miles (15 km^{2}) (0.5%) are covered by water.

=== Major highways ===
- U.S. Highway 83
- Spur 200

=== Adjacent counties and municipalities ===
- Jim Hogg County (north)
- Brooks County (northeast)
- Hidalgo County (east)
- Zapata County (northwest)
- State of Tamaulipas, Mexico, from northwest to south, the municipalities of
  - Guerrero (northwest)
  - Mier (south)
  - Miguel Alemán (south)
  - Camargo (south)
  - Gustavo Díaz Ordaz (south)

=== National protected area ===
- Lower Rio Grande Valley National Wildlife Refuge (part)

== Demographics ==
Historical population
Census	Pop.	Note	%±
1860	2,406		—
1870	4,154		72.7%
1880	8,304		99.9%
1890	10,749		29.4%
1900	11,469		6.7%
1910	13,151		14.7%
1920	11,089		−15.7%
1930	11,409		2.9%
1940	13,312		16.7%
1950	13,948		4.8%
1960	17,137		22.9%
1970	17,707		3.3%
1980	27,266		54.0%
1990	40,518		48.6%
2000	53,597		32.3%
2010	60,968		13.8%
2020	65,920		8.1%
2025 (est.)	66,319	▲	0.6%
U.S. Decennial Census; 1850–2010 2010–2014

=== 2020 census ===
As of the 2020 census, the county had a population of 65,920 and 12,836 families residing within its borders. The median age was 31.9 years. 30.1% of residents were under the age of 18 and 12.9% of residents were 65 years of age or older. For every 100 females there were 92.5 males, and for every 100 females age 18 and over there were 88.2 males age 18 and over.

The racial makeup of the county was 33.1% White, 0.1% Black or African American, 0.4% American Indian and Alaska Native, 0.2% Asian, <0.1% Native Hawaiian and Pacific Islander, 19.1% from some other race, and 47.1% from two or more races. Hispanic or Latino residents of any race comprised 97.7% of the population.

71.4% of residents lived in urban areas, while 28.6% lived in rural areas.

There were 19,868 households in the county, of which 47.2% had children under the age of 18 living in them. Of all households, 52.1% were married-couple households, 14.0% were households with a male householder and no spouse or partner present, and 30.6% were households with a female householder and no spouse or partner present. About 17.5% of all households were made up of individuals and 8.7% had someone living alone who was 65 years of age or older.

There were 22,980 housing units, of which 13.5% were vacant. Among occupied housing units, 75.1% were owner-occupied and 24.9% were renter-occupied. The homeowner vacancy rate was 1.0% and the rental vacancy rate was 9.2%.

According to the Census Bureau, Starr County had the highest percentage of Hispanic residents of any county in the United States, and the lowest percentage of non-Hispanic White residents.

=== Racial and ethnic composition ===
Starr County, Texas – Racial and ethnic composition Note: the US Census treats Hispanic/Latino as an ethnic category. This table excludes Latinos from the racial categories and assigns them to a separate category. Hispanics/Latinos may be of any race.
Race / Ethnicity (NH = Non-Hispanic)	Pop 1980	Pop 1990	Pop 2000	Pop 2010	Pop 2020	% 1980	% 1990	% 2000	% 2010	% 2020
White alone (NH)	812	1,001	1,082	2,449	1,171	2.98%	2.47%	2.02%	4.02%	1.78%
Black or African American alone (NH)	3	9	6	15	31	0.01%	0.02%	0.01%	0.02%	0.05%
Native American or Alaska Native alone (NH)	9	6	27	17	8	0.03%	0.01%	0.05%	0.03%	0.01%
Asian alone (NH)	14	13	141	119	100	0.05%	0.03%	0.26%	0.20%	0.15%
Native Hawaiian or Pacific Islander alone (NH)	x	x	15	0	0	x	x	0.03%	0.00%	0.00%
Other race alone (NH)	0	99	11	5	98	0.00%	0.24%	0.02%	0.01%	0.15%
Mixed race or Multiracial (NH)	x	x	37	26	119	x	x	0.07%	0.04%	0.18%
Hispanic or Latino (any race)	26,428	39,390	52,278	58,337	64,393	96.93%	97.22%	97.54%	95.68%	97.68%
Total	27,266	40,518	53,597	60,968	65,920	100.00%	100.00%	100.00%	100.00%	100.00%

=== 2010 census ===
As of the 2010 United States census, 60,968 people were living in the county. About 0.4% were Non-Hispanic White, 0.2% Asian, 0.1% Native American, 0.1% Black or African American, 3.0% of some other race, and 0.5% of two or more races; 95.7% were Hispanic or Latino (of any race).

=== 2000 census ===
As of the census of 2000, 53,597 people, 14,410 households, and 12,666 families were living in the county. The population density was 44 people per square mile (17 people/km^{2}). The 17,589 housing units had an average density of 14 units per square mile (5.4 units/km^{2}). The racial makeup of the county was 87.92% White, 0.15% African American, 0.25% Native American, 0.28% Asian, 9.95% from other races, and 1.46% from two or more races.

Of the 14,410 households, 54.7% had children under 18 living with them, 66.5% were married couples living together, 17.4% had a female householder with no husband present, and 12.1% were not families. About 11.3% of all households were made up of individuals, and 5.9% had someone living alone who was 65or older. The average household size was 3.69, and the average family size was 4.01.

In the county, the age distribution was 37.4% under the age of 18, 11.0% from 18 to 24, 27.1% from 25 to 44, 16.3% from 45 to 64, and 8.2% who were 65 or older. The median age was 26 years. For every 100 females, there were 94.20 males. For every 100 females 18 and over, there were 88.10 males.

The median income for a household in the county was $16,504, and for a family was $17,556. Males had a median income of $17,398 versus $13,533 for females. The per capita income for the county was $7,069, which is the third-lowest in the United States. About 47.40% of families and 50.90% of the population were below the poverty line, including 59.40% of those under age 18 and 43.30% of those age 65 or over.

As of 2009 the median household income was $22,418.

A key group of Hispanics and Latinos in the county, Tejanos, are, compared to other groups of Hispanics and Latinos, are more likely to describe their race as white. If Hispanic/Latino is not counted as a race, the county is majority white, as 99% of the residents, circa 2021, counted themselves as white. Jack Herrera of Texas Monthly stated that "That means the county isn’t just one of the most Hispanic in the country. It’s also one of the whitest."

== Economy ==
Starr County is especially known for oilseeds and dry beans, one of the highest-producing counties in the state.

== Education ==
Residents of eastern Starr County are zoned to schools in the Rio Grande City Consolidated Independent School District. Residents of western Starr County are zoned to schools in the Roma Independent School District. Residents of northeastern Starr County are zoned to schools in the San Isidro Independent School District.

The Roman Catholic Diocese of Brownsville operates area Catholic schools. Immaculate Conception School, located in Rio Grande City and founded in 1884, is the only Catholic school in Starr County and provides a faith-based pre-K through eighth-grade education to approximately 250 students each year.

All of the county is in the service area of South Texas College.

== Government and politics ==
=== Law enforcement ===
In the 1970s and into the 1980s, federal law-enforcement officials concentrated their efforts against drug smuggling on Starr County.

On May 1, 2009, the former sheriff of Starr County, Reymundo Guerra, a Democrat, pleaded guilty in federal court to a narcotics conspiracy charge.

In April 2016, Starr County Justice of the Peace Salvador Zarate Jr., faced up to 20 years imprisonment and a $10,000 fine on two counts of bribery for accepting a $500 bribe in exchange for reducing bond on two persons arrested on narcotics charges in an incident on Christmas Eve 2014. He was found not guilty of possession of a controlled substance. Zarate was expected to appeal any sentence rendered.

=== Presidential elections ===
Starr County had long been a strongly Democratic county. However, in 2024, Donald Trump became the first Republican since 1892 to carry the county, ending over 130 years of Democratic dominance. Starr had the longest streak of voting for Democrats in the entire country. Its streak was triple the length of Minnesota's Democratic streak, which began in 1976. In 1988, the county gave Michael Dukakis his highest vote share in the nation, as well as Bill Clinton in 1996.

In 2008, Barack Obama won Starr County with 8,274 votes, or 84 percent of the total vote. In 2020, Donald Trump came within five points of winning the county, receiving 8,247 votes (47 percent) to Joe Biden's 9,123 (52 percent). This was a major shift from Hillary Clinton's 60-point margin of victory four years earlier, and it represented the strongest pro-Trump swing of any county in the nation. Trump received more than three times as many votes in 2020 compared to 2016 in the county.

In 2024, Trump received a majority of the votes in Starr County, winning it by a 16% margin, which was larger than Trump's 14% margin statewide. Republican U.S. Senator Ted Cruz also concurrently won Starr County in the 2024 U.S. Senate election in Texas. Starr County was the lowest-income county in Texas that Trump won, with a median household income of $38,824 in 2023. It is also the county that shifted furthest to the right from 2012 to 2024, having done so by 89 percentage points.

United States presidential election results for Starr County, Texas
Year	Republican		Democratic		Third party(ies)	
Year	No.	%	No.	%	No.	%
1912	252	27.16%	674	72.63%	2	0.22%
1916	115	18.23%	516	81.77%	0	0.00%
1920	89	17.55%	418	82.45%	0	0.00%
1924	23	2.95%	756	97.05%	0	0.00%
1928	79	9.69%	736	90.31%	0	0.00%
1932	32	4.07%	754	95.93%	0	0.00%
1936	320	12.22%	2,289	87.43%	9	0.34%
1940	68	5.36%	1,200	94.64%	0	0.00%
1944	68	4.87%	1,312	94.05%	15	1.08%
1948	179	8.18%	1,996	91.22%	13	0.59%
1952	620	16.87%	3,055	83.13%	0	0.00%
1956	547	16.71%	2,727	83.29%	0	0.00%
1960	280	6.46%	4,051	93.49%	2	0.05%
1964	678	14.30%	4,056	85.53%	8	0.17%
1968	1,374	25.60%	3,922	73.08%	71	1.32%
1972	2,389	41.82%	3,320	58.11%	4	0.07%
1976	664	12.47%	4,646	87.25%	15	0.28%
1980	1,389	22.21%	4,782	76.48%	82	1.31%
1984	1,658	24.70%	5,047	75.18%	8	0.12%
1988	1,218	14.83%	6,958	84.74%	35	0.43%
1992	1,209	13.05%	7,668	82.80%	384	4.15%
1996	756	10.41%	6,312	86.94%	192	2.64%
2000	1,911	22.58%	6,505	76.85%	48	0.57%
2004	2,552	26.09%	7,199	73.60%	30	0.31%
2008	1,492	15.24%	8,274	84.50%	26	0.27%
2012	1,547	13.02%	10,260	86.34%	76	0.64%
2016	2,224	18.94%	9,289	79.12%	227	1.93%
2020	8,247	47.06%	9,123	52.06%	155	0.88%
2024	9,487	57.77%	6,862	41.79%	72	0.44%

United States Senate election results for Starr County, Texas1
Year	Republican		Democratic		Third party(ies)	
Year	No.	%	No.	%	No.	%
2024	7,081	49.93%	6,745	47.56%	356	2.51%

United States Senate election results for Starr County, Texas2
Year	Republican		Democratic		Third party(ies)	
Year	No.	%	No.	%	No.	%
2020	5,845	39.62%	8,161	55.33%	745	5.05%

Texas Gubernatorial election results for Starr County
Year	Republican		Democratic		Third party(ies)	
Year	No.	%	No.	%	No.	%
2022	4,460	40.12%	6,455	58.06%	202	1.82%

== Communities ==
As of 2011, Starr County had approximately 55 colonias. By that year, many families were moving to the colonias.

Between the 2000 and 2010 censuses, Starr County went through many changes. Four CDPs were deleted, one gained area, 12 lost area, and 92 new CDPs were created. Only 11 remained unchanged.

=== Cities ===
- Escobares
- La Grulla
- Rio Grande City (county seat)
- Roma

=== Unincorporated communities ===
- La Gloria
- La Reforma
- Santa Catarina
- Santa Elena

=== Former communities ===
- Viboras

=== Census-designated places ===
- Airport Heights
- Alto Bonito Heights
- Amada Acres
- Anacua
- B and E
- Barrera
- Benjamin Perez
- Buena Vista
- Camargito
- Campo Verde
- Casa Blanca
- Casas
- Chaparrito
- Chapeno
- Delmita
- East Alto Bonito
- East Lopez
- El Brazil
- El Castillo
- El Cenizo
- El Chaparral
- El Mesquite
- El Quiote
- El Rancho Vela
- El Refugio
- El Socio
- Elias-Fela Solis
- Eugenio Saenz
- Evergreen
- Falcon Heights
- Falcon Village
- Falconaire
- Fernando Salinas
- Flor del Rio
- Fronton
- Fronton Ranchettes
- Garceno
- Garciasville
- Garza-Salinas II
- Guadalupe-Guerra
- Gutierrez
- H. Cuellar Estates
- Hilltop
- Indio
- Jardin de San Julian
- JF Villarreal
- La Carla
- La Casita
- La Chuparosa
- La Escondida
- La Esperanza
- La Loma de Falcon
- La Minita
- La Paloma Ranchettes
- La Puerta
- La Rosita
- La Victoria
- Lago Vista
- Las Lomas
- Loma Linda East
- Loma Linda West
- Loma Vista
- Longoria
- Los Alvarez
- Los Arrieros
- Los Barreras
- Los Ebanos
- Manuel Garcia
- Manuel Garcia II
- Martinez
- Mesquite
- Mi Ranchito Estate
- Miguel Barrera
- Mikes
- Moraida
- Narciso Pena
- Netos
- Nina
- North Escobares
- Olivia Lopez de Gutierrez
- Olmito and Olmito
- Pablo Pena
- Palo Blanco
- Pena
- Quesada
- Rafael Pena
- Ramirez-Perez
- Ramos
- Ranchitos del Norte
- Rancho Viejo
- Regino Ramirez
- Rivereno
- Salineño
- Salineño North
- Sammy Martinez
- San Fernando
- San Isidro
- San Juan
- Sandoval
- Santa Anna
- Santa Cruz
- Santa Rosa
- Santel
- Sunset
- Tierra Dorada
- Valle Hermoso
- Valle Vista
- Victoria Vera
- Villarreal
- West Alto Bonito
- Zarate

=== Former census-designated places ===
- Escobar I
- Los Villareales
- Northridge
- Old Escobares
- Rivera
- Roma Creek
- Santa Cruz (old)

== See also ==
- National Register of Historic Places listings in Starr County, Texas
- Recorded Texas Historic Landmarks in Starr County
