= La Paloma Ranchettes, Texas =

- CDP
- Interactive map of La Paloma Ranchettes, Texas
- Coordinates: 26°18′53″N 98°37′23″W
- Country: United States
- State: Texas
- County: Starr

Area
  - Total: 0.5 sq mi (1.3 km^{2})
  - Land: 0.5 sq mi (1.3 km^{2})
  - Water: 0.0 sq mi (0 km^{2})

Population (2020)
  - Total: 329
  - Density: 660/sq mi (250/km^{2})
- Time zone: UTC-6 (Central (CST))
  - Summer (DST): UTC-5 (CDT)
- Zip Code: 78582

La Paloma Ranchettes is a census-designated place (CDP) in Starr County, Texas, United States. It was a new CDP for the 2010 census. As of the 2020 census, La Paloma Ranchettes had a population of 329.

== Geography ==
La Paloma Ranchettes is located at 26°18′53″N 98°37′23″W (26.314792, -98.623017).

== Demographics ==
Historical population
Census	Pop.	Note	%±
2010	239		—
2020	329		37.7%
U.S. Decennial Census; 1850–1900 1910; 1920 1930 1940; 1950 1960 1970; 1980 1990 2000; 2010 2020

La Paloma Ranchettes first appeared as a census designated place in the 2010 U.S. census.

=== 2020 census ===
La Paloma Ranchettes CDP, Texas – Racial and ethnic composition Note: the US Census treats Hispanic/Latino as an ethnic category. This table excludes Latinos from the racial categories and assigns them to a separate category. Hispanics/Latinos may be of any race.
Race / Ethnicity (NH = Non-Hispanic)	Pop 2010	Pop 2020	% 2010	% 2020
White alone (NH)	0	1	0.00%	0.30%
Black or African American alone (NH)	0	0	0.00%	0.00%
Native American or Alaska Native alone (NH)	0	0	0.00%	0.00%
Asian alone (NH)	0	0	0.00%	0.00%
Native Hawaiian or Pacific Islander alone (NH)	0	0	0.00%	0.00%
Other race alone (NH)	0	0	0.00%	0.00%
Mixed race or Multiracial (NH)	0	0	0.00%	0.00%
Hispanic or Latino (any race)	239	328	100.00%	99.70%
Total	239	329	100.00%	100.00%

== Education ==
The CDP is within the Rio Grande City Grulla Independent School District (formerly Rio Grande City Consolidated Independent School District)
