= El Refugio, Texas =

- CDP
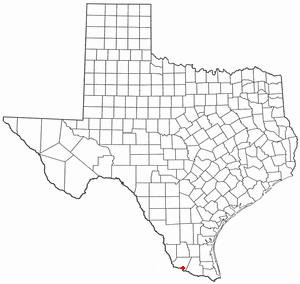
- Location of El Refugio, Texas

- Coordinates: 26°20′32″N 98°45′34″W
- Country: United States
- State: Texas
- County: Starr
- Established

Area
  - Total: 0.6 sq mi (1.6 km^{2})
  - Land: 0.6 sq mi (1.6 km^{2})
  - Water: 0.0 sq mi (0 km^{2})
- Elevation: 151 ft (46 m)

Population (2020)
  - Total: 407
  - Density: 680/sq mi (260/km^{2})
- Time zone: UTC-6 (Central (CST))
  - Summer (DST): UTC-5 (CDT)
- Zip Code: 78582
- FIPS code: 48-24018
- GNIS feature ID: 1335260

El Refugio ("The Refuge") is a census-designated place (CDP) in Starr County, Texas, United States. The population was 407 at the 2020 census. El Refugio gained area in the 2010 census.

== Geography ==
El Refugio is located at 26°20′32″N 98°45′34″W (26.342149, -98.759408).

According to the United States Census Bureau, the CDP has a total area of 0.6 square miles (2.0 km^{2}), all land.

== Demographics ==
Historical population
Census	Pop.	Note	%±
2000	221		—
2010	331		49.8%
2020	407		23.0%
U.S. Decennial Census; 1850–1900 1910; 1920 1930 1940; 1950 1960 1970; 1980 1990 2000; 2010 2020

El Refugio first appeared as a census designated place in the 2020 U.S. census.

=== 2020 census ===
El Refugio CDP, Texas – Racial and ethnic composition Note: the US Census treats Hispanic/Latino as an ethnic category. This table excludes Latinos from the racial categories and assigns them to a separate category. Hispanics/Latinos may be of any race.
Race / Ethnicity (NH = Non-Hispanic)	Pop 2000	Pop 2010	Pop 2020	% 2000	% 2010	% 2020
White alone (NH)	2	15	6	0.90%	4.53%	1.47%
Black or African American alone (NH)	0	0	0	0.00%	0.00%	0.00%
Native American or Alaska Native alone (NH)	0	4	0	0.00%	1.21%	0.00%
Asian alone (NH)	0	0	0	0.00%	0.00%	0.00%
Pacific Islander alone (NH)	0	0	0	0.00%	0.00%	0.00%
Some Other Race alone (NH)	0	0	0	0.00%	0.00%	0.00%
Mixed race or Multiracial (NH)	0	0	0	0.00%	0.00%	0.00%
Hispanic or Latino (any race)	219	312	401	99.10%	94.26%	98.53%
Total	221	331	407	100.00%	100.00%	100.00%

=== 2000 census ===
At the 2000 census there were 221 people, 56 households, and 50 families living in the CDP. The population density was 434.5 inhabitants per square mile (167.8/km^{2}). There were 67 housing units at an average density of 131.7 per square mile (50.8/km^{2}). The racial makeup of the CDP was 100.00% Caucasian. Hispanic or Latino of any race were 99.10%.

Of the 56 households 50.0% had children under the age of 18 living with them, 71.4% were married couples living together, 17.9% had a female householder with no husband present, and 10.7% were non-families. 10.7% of households were one person and 7.1% were one person aged 65 or older. The average household size was 3.95 and the average family size was 4.30.

The age distribution was 30.8% under the age of 18, 18.1% from 18 to 24, 27.1% from 25 to 44, 15.4% from 45 to 64, and 8.6% 65 or older. The median age was 26 years. For every 100 females, there were 114.6 males. For every 100 females age 18 and over, there were 104.0 males.

The median household income was $12,750 and the median family income was $12,176. Males had a median income of $31,528 versus $30,625 for females. The per capita income for the CDP was $6,344. About 40.0% of families and 51.2% of the population were below the poverty line, including 74.0% of those under the age of eighteen and none of those sixty five or over.

== Education ==
The community is served by the Rio Grande City Grulla Independent School District (formerly Rio Grande City Consolidated Independent School District)
