= Casa Blanca, Starr County, Texas =

Casa Blanca, Texas
- CDP
- Interactive map of Casa Blanca, Texas
- Coordinates: 26°17′52″N 98°36′37″W
- Country: United States
- State: Texas
- County: Starr

Population (2020)
  - Total: 65
- Time zone: UTC-6 (Central (CST))
  - Summer (DST): UTC-5 (CDT)
- Zip Code: 78582

Casa Blanca is a census-designated place (CDP) in Starr County, Texas, United States. This was a new CDP for the 2010 census, with a population of 54.

== Geography ==
Casa Blanca is located at 26°17′52″N 98°36′37″W (26.297641, -98.610251).

== Demographics ==
Historical population
Census	Pop.	Note	%±
2010	54		—
2020	65		20.4%
U.S. Decennial Census; 1850–1900 1910; 1920 1930 1940; 1950 1960 1970; 1980 1990 2000; 2010

Casa Blanca first appeared as a census designated place in the 2010 U.S. census.

=== 2020 census ===
Casa Blanca CDP, Texas – Racial and ethnic composition Note: the US Census treats Hispanic/Latino as an ethnic category. This table excludes Latinos from the racial categories and assigns them to a separate category. Hispanics/Latinos may be of any race.
Race / Ethnicity (NH = Non-Hispanic)	Pop 2010	Pop 2020	% 2010	% 2020
White alone (NH)	0	0	0.00%	0.00%
Black or African American alone (NH)	0	0	0.00%	0.00%
Native American or Alaska Native alone (NH)	0	0	0.00%	0.00%
Asian alone (NH)	0	0	0.00%	0.00%
Native Hawaiian or Pacific Islander alone (NH)	0	0	0.00%	0.00%
Other race alone (NH)	0	0	0.00%	0.00%
Mixed race or Multiracial (NH)	0	1	0.00%	1.54%
Hispanic or Latino (any race)	54	64	100.00%	98.46%
Total	54	65	100.00%	100.00%

== Education ==
The CDP is within the Rio Grande City Grulla Independent School District (formerly Rio Grande City Consolidated Independent School District)
