= Las Lomas, Texas =

- CDP
- Coordinates: 26°21′50″N 98°46′29″W
- Country: United States
- State: Texas
- County: Starr

Area
  - Total: 0.4 sq mi (1.0 km^{2})
  - Land: 0.4 sq mi (1.0 km^{2})
  - Water: 0.0 sq mi (0 km^{2})
- Elevation: 184 ft (56 m)

Population (2020)
  - Total: 3,054
  - Density: 7,600/sq mi (2,900/km^{2})
- Time zone: UTC-6 (Central (CST))
  - Summer (DST): UTC-5 (CDT)
- Zip Code: 78582
- FIPS code: 48-41566
- GNIS feature ID: 1852726

Las Lomas is a census-designated place (CDP) in Starr County, Texas, United States. As of the 2020 census, Las Lomas had a population of 3,054. Las Lomas is one of several colonias in Starr County, within the Rio Grande Valley region. The name is derived from the community's terrain.

== Geography ==
Las Lomas is located at 26°21′50″N 98°46′29″W (26.363943, -98.774670).

Prior to the 2010 census, part of Las Lomas CDP was annexed to the Rio Grande City. As a result, the CDP's total area was reduced to 0.4 square mile (1.036 km^{2}), all land.

Emanuella Grinberg of CNN said that Las Lomas at one time "consisted of dilapidated shacks, trailers or homes in various stages of completion. Homes with no foundations, no floors, no windows, doors, or walls were scattered throughout" the community. Grinberg added that "strong winds stirred up suffocating clouds of dust in the streets" because all of the streets were unpaved. She added that "[s]mall gullies formed when it rained because there was no drainage system. Gangs of teens prowled the area, burning unattended construction sites, stealing TVs or the few households appliances people owned". As of 2011, residents are increasingly gaining basic services.

== Demographics ==
Historical population
Census	Pop.	Note	%±
2000	2,684		—
2010	3,147		17.3%
2020	3,054		−3.0%
U.S. Decennial Census; 1850–1900 1910; 1920 1930 1940; 1950 1960 1970; 1980 1990 2000; 2010 2020

Las Lomas was first listed as a census designated place in the 2000 U.S. census.

=== Racial and ethnic composition ===
Las Lomas CDP, Texas – Racial and ethnic composition Note: the US Census treats Hispanic/Latino as an ethnic category. This table excludes Latinos from the racial categories and assigns them to a separate category. Hispanics/Latinos may be of any race.
Race / Ethnicity (NH = Non-Hispanic)	Pop 2000	Pop 2010	Pop 2020	% 2000	% 2010	% 2020
White alone (NH)	11	326	30	0.41%	10.36%	0.98%
Black or African American alone (NH)	0	0	4	0.00%	0.00%	0.13%
Native American or Alaska Native alone (NH)	0	0	0	0.00%	0.00%	0.00%
Asian alone (NH)	0	0	0	0.00%	0.00%	0.00%
Pacific Islander alone (NH)	0	0	0	0.00%	0.00%	0.00%
Some Other Race alone (NH)	5	0	6	0.19%	0.00%	0.20%
Mixed race or Multiracial (NH)	1	1	1	0.04%	0.03%	0.03%
Hispanic or Latino (any race)	2,667	2,820	3,013	99.37%	89.61%	98.66%
Total	2,684	3,147	3,054	100.00%	100.00%	100.00%

=== 2020 census ===
As of the 2020 census, Las Lomas had a population of 3,054. The median age was 29.4 years. 31.7% of residents were under the age of 18 and 10.7% of residents were 65 years of age or older. For every 100 females there were 92.6 males, and for every 100 females age 18 and over there were 86.2 males age 18 and over.

100.0% of residents lived in urban areas, while 0.0% lived in rural areas.

There were 856 households in Las Lomas, of which 51.3% had children under the age of 18 living in them. Of all households, 51.2% were married-couple households, 11.7% were households with a male householder and no spouse or partner present, and 33.5% were households with a female householder and no spouse or partner present. About 11.5% of all households were made up of individuals and 4.7% had someone living alone who was 65 years of age or older.

There were 948 housing units, of which 9.7% were vacant. The homeowner vacancy rate was 0.0% and the rental vacancy rate was 8.0%.

=== 2000 census ===
As of the census of 2000, there were 2,684 people, 629 households, and 598 families residing in the CDP. The population density was 4,817.4 inhabitants per square mile (1,860.0/km^{2}). There were 728 housing units at an average density of 1,306.6 per square mile (504.5/km^{2}). The racial makeup of the CDP was 90.13% White, 0.04% Asian, 9.61% from other races, and 0.22% from two or more races. Hispanic or Latino of any race were 99.37% of the population.

There were 629 households, out of which 72.3% had children under the age of 18 living with them, 76.9% were married couples living together, 14.5% had a female householder with no husband present, and 4.8% were non-families. 4.8% of all households were made up of individuals, and 3.5% had someone living alone who was 65 years of age or older. The average household size was 4.27 and the average family size was 4.39.

In the CDP, the population was spread out, with 44.9% under the age of 18, 11.3% from 18 to 24, 27.5% from 25 to 44, 12.9% from 45 to 64, and 3.4% who were 65 years of age or older. The median age was 21 years. For every 100 females, there were 100.7 males. For every 100 females age 18 and over, there were 92.4 males.

The median income for a household in the CDP was $10,927, and the median income for a family was $11,000. Males had a median income of $9,833 versus $9,643 for females. The per capita income for the CDP was $3,877. About 72.6% of families and 70.7% of the population were below the poverty line, including 73.2% of those under age 18 and 51.4% of those age 65 or over.

=== Demographic estimates ===
Many of the original settlers of the community originated from Mexico. As of 2011 64.4% of all of Las Lomas's residents and 85% of Las Lomas residents under the age of 18 were born in the United States. Most residents of Las Lomas are legally in the United States.

== Education ==
Las Lomas is served by the Rio Grande City Grulla Independent School District (formerly Rio Grande City Consolidated Independent School District)
