= Camargito, Texas =

- CDP
- Interactive map of Camargito, Texas
- Coordinates: 26°20′43″N 98°44′20″W
- Country: United States
- State: Texas
- County: Starr

Area
  - Total: 0.1 sq mi (0.26 km^{2})
  - Land: 0.1 sq mi (0.26 km^{2})
  - Water: 0.0 sq mi (0 km^{2})

Population (2020)
  - Total: 324
  - Density: 3,200/sq mi (1,300/km^{2})
- Time zone: UTC-6 (Central (CST))
  - Summer (DST): UTC-5 (CDT)
- Zip Code: 78582
- FIPS code: 48-12010

Camargito is a census-designated place (CDP) in Starr County, Texas, United States. It was a new CDP for the 2010 census. As of the 2020 census, Camargito had a population of 324.

== Geography ==
Camargito is located at 26°20′43″N 98°44′20″W (26.345219, -98.738798).).

== Education ==
The CDP is within the Rio Grande City Grulla Independent School District (formerly Rio Grande City Consolidated Independent School District)

== Demographics ==
Historical population
Census	Pop.	Note	%±
2010	388		—
2020	324		−16.5%
U.S. Decennial Census; 1850–1900 1910; 1920 1930 1940; 1950 1960 1970; 1980 1990 2000; 2010

Camargito first appeared as a census designated place in the 2010 U.S. census.

=== 2020 census ===
Camargito CDP, Texas – Racial and ethnic composition Note: the US Census treats Hispanic/Latino as an ethnic category. This table excludes Latinos from the racial categories and assigns them to a separate category. Hispanics/Latinos may be of any race.
Race / Ethnicity (NH = Non-Hispanic)	Pop 2010	Pop 2020	% 2010	% 2020
White alone (NH)	2	6	0.52%	1.85%
Black or African American alone (NH)	0	1	0.00%	0.31%
Native American or Alaska Native alone (NH)	0	0	0.00%	0.00%
Asian alone (NH)	0	0	0.00%	0.00%
Pacific Islander alone (NH)	0	0	0.00%	0.00%
Some Other Race alone (NH)	0	0	0.00%	0.00%
Mixed Race or Multi-Racial (NH)	0	2	0.00%	0.62%
Hispanic or Latino (any race)	386	315	99.48%	97.22%
Total	388	324	100.00%	100.00%
