= Narciso Pena, Texas =

- CDP
- Interactive map of Narciso Pena, Texas
- Coordinates: 26°18′7″N 98°38′27″W
- Country: United States
- State: Texas
- County: Starr

Population (2020)
  - Total: 32
- Time zone: UTC-6 (Central (CST))
  - Summer (DST): UTC-5 (CDT)
- Zip Code: 78582

Narciso Pena is a census-designated place (CDP) in Starr County, Texas, United States. This was a new CDP for the 2010 census. As of the 2020 census, Narciso Pena had a population of 32.

== Geography ==
Narciso Pena is located at 26°18′7″N 98°38′27″W (26.301870, -98.640696).

== Demographics ==
Historical population
| Census | Pop. | Note | %± |
|---|---|---|---|
| 2010 | 30 | | — |
| 2020 | 32 | | 6.7% |
U.S. Decennial Census; 1850–1900 1910; 1920 1930 1940; 1950 1960 1970; 1980 1990 2000; 2010

Narciso Pena first appeared as a census designated place in the 2010 U.S. census.

=== 2020 census ===
Narciso Pena CDP, Texas – Racial and ethnic composition Note: the US Census treats Hispanic/Latino as an ethnic category. This table excludes Latinos from the racial categories and assigns them to a separate category. Hispanics/Latinos may be of any race.
| Race / Ethnicity (NH = Non-Hispanic) | Pop 2010 | Pop 2020 | % 2010 | % 2020 |
|---|---|---|---|---|
| White alone (NH) | 0 | 4 | 0.00% | 12.50% |
| Black or African American alone (NH) | 0 | 0 | 0.00% | 0.00% |
| Native American or Alaska Native alone (NH) | 0 | 0 | 0.00% | 0.00% |
| Asian alone (NH) | 0 | 0 | 0.00% | 0.00% |
| Native Hawaiian or Pacific Islander alone (NH) | 0 | 0 | 0.00% | 0.00% |
| Other race alone (NH) | 0 | 0 | 0.00% | 0.00% |
| Mixed race or Multiracial (NH) | 0 | 0 | 0.00% | 0.00% |
| Hispanic or Latino (any race) | 30 | 28 | 100.00% | 87.50% |
| Total | 30 | 32 | 100.00% | 100.00% |

== Education ==
The CDP is within the Rio Grande City Grulla Independent School District (formerly Rio Grande City Consolidated Independent School District)
