= Northridge, Texas =

- Unincorporated community Former Census designated place
- Interactive map of Northridge, Texas
- Coordinates: 26°24′50″N 98°59′47″W
- Country: United States
- State: Texas
- County: Starr

Population (2010)
  - Total: 78
- Time zone: UTC-6 (Central (CST))
  - Summer (DST): UTC-5 (CDT)
- Zip Code: 78584

Northridge is a former census-designated place (CDP) in Starr County, Texas, United States. It first appeared as a CDP in the 2010 census with a population of 78.

It was absorbed by the city of Roma prior to the 2020 U.S. census and delisted as a CDP.

== Geography ==
Northridge is located at 26°24′50″N 98°59′47″W (26.413767, -98.996472).

== Demographics ==
Historical population
| Census | Pop. | Note | %± |
|---|---|---|---|
| 2010 | 78 | | — |
U.S. Decennial Census; 1850–1900 1910; 1920 1930 1940; 1950 1960 1970; 1980 1990 2000; 2010

Northridge CDP, Texas – Racial and ethnic composition Note: the US Census treats Hispanic/Latino as an ethnic category. This table excludes Latinos from the racial categories and assigns them to a separate category. Hispanics/Latinos may be of any race.
| Race / Ethnicity (NH = Non-Hispanic) | Pop 2010 | % 2010 |
|---|---|---|
| White alone (NH) | 0 | 0.00% |
| Black or African American alone (NH) | 0 | 0.00% |
| Native American or Alaska Native alone (NH) | 4 | 1.23% |
| Asian alone (NH) | 0 | 0.00% |
| Pacific Islander alone (NH) | 0 | 0.00% |
| Other race alone (NH) | 0 | 0.00% |
| Mixed race or Multiracial (NH) | 0 | 0.00% |
| Hispanic or Latino (any race) | 78 | 100.00% |
| Total | 78 | 100.00% |
