= El Brazil, Texas =

- CDP
- Location within Texas Location within the United States
- Coordinates: 26°28′7″N 98°43′37″W
- Country: United States
- State: Texas
- County: Starr

Area
  - Total: 0.2 sq mi (0.52 km^{2})
  - Land: 0.2 sq mi (0.52 km^{2})
  - Water: 0.0 sq mi (0 km^{2})

Population (2020)
  - Total: 53
  - Density: 270/sq mi (100/km^{2})
- Time zone: UTC-6 (Central (CST))
  - Summer (DST): UTC-5 (CDT)
- Zip Code: 78582

El Brazil is a census-designated place (CDP) in Starr County, Texas, United States. It was a new CDP for the 2010 census. As of the 2020 census, El Brazil had a population of 53.

== Geography ==
El Brazil is located at 26°28′7″N 98°43′37″W (26.468651, -98.726828).

== Demographics ==
Historical population
Census	Pop.	Note	%±
2010	47		—
2020	53		12.8%
U.S. Decennial Census; 1850–1900 1910; 1920 1930 1940; 1950 1960 1970; 1980 1990 2000; 2010 2020

El Brazil first appeared as a census designated place in the 2010 U.S. census.

=== 2020 census ===
El Brazil CDP, Texas – Racial and ethnic composition Note: the US Census treats Hispanic/Latino as an ethnic category. This table excludes Latinos from the racial categories and assigns them to a separate category. Hispanics/Latinos may be of any race.
Race / Ethnicity (NH = Non-Hispanic)	Pop 2010	Pop 2020	% 2010	% 2020
White alone (NH)	0	2	0.00%	3.77%
Black or African American alone (NH)	0	0	0.00%	0.00%
Native American or Alaska Native alone (NH)	0	0	0.00%	0.00%
Asian alone (NH)	0	0	0.00%	0.00%
Native Hawaiian or Pacific Islander alone (NH)	0	0	0.00%	0.00%
Other race alone (NH)	0	1	0.00%	1.89%
Mixed race or Multiracial (NH)	0	1	0.00%	1.89%
Hispanic or Latino (any race)	47	49	100.00%	92.45%
Total	47	53	100.00%	100.00%

== Education ==
The CDP is within the Rio Grande City Grulla Independent School District (formerly Rio Grande City Consolidated Independent School District).
