= Jardin de San Julian, Texas =

- CDP
- Interactive map of Jardin de San Julian, Texas
- Coordinates: 26°31′31″N 99°6′0″W
- Country: United States
- State: Texas
- County: Starr

Population (2020)
  - Total: 23
- Time zone: UTC-6 (Central (CST))
  - Summer (DST): UTC-5 (CDT)
- Zip Code: 78584

Jardin de San Julian is a census-designated place (CDP) in Starr County, Texas, United States. As of the 2020 census, Jardin de San Julian had a population of 23. This was a new CDP for the 2010 census.

== Location ==
Jardin de San Julian is located at 26°31′31″N 99°6′0″W (26.525375, -99.099851).

== Demographics ==
Historical population
Census	Pop.	Note	%±
2010	22		—
2020	23		4.5%
U.S. Decennial Census; 1850–1900 1910; 1920 1930 1940; 1950 1960 1970; 1980 1990 2000; 2010 2020

Jardin de San Julian first appeared as a census designated place in the 2010 U.S. census.

=== 2020 census ===
Jardin de San Julian CDP, Texas – Racial and ethnic composition Note: the US Census treats Hispanic/Latino as an ethnic category. This table excludes Latinos from the racial categories and assigns them to a separate category. Hispanics/Latinos may be of any race.
Race / Ethnicity (NH = Non-Hispanic)	Pop 2010	Pop 2020	% 2010	% 2020
White alone (NH)	0	0	0.00%	0.00%
Black or African American alone (NH)	0	0	0.00%	0.00%
Native American or Alaska Native alone (NH)	0	0	0.00%	0.00%
Asian alone (NH)	0	0	0.00%	0.00%
Native Hawaiian or Pacific Islander alone (NH)	0	0	0.00%	0.00%
Other race alone (NH)	0	0	0.00%	0.00%
Mixed race or Multiracial (NH)	0	0	0.00%	0.00%
Hispanic or Latino (any race)	22	23	100.00%	100.00%
Total	22	23	100.00%	100.00%

== Education ==
The CDP is within the Roma Independent School District. The zoned elementary school for the 2010 Census community is Emma Vera Elementary School. Roma High School is the district's sole comprehensive high school.
