= El Mesquite, Texas =

- CDP
- Interactive map of El Mesquite, Texas
- Coordinates: 26°23′5″N 98°46′18″W
- Country: United States
- State: Texas
- County: Starr

Population (2020)
  - Total: 50
- Time zone: UTC-6 (Central (CST))
  - Summer (DST): UTC-5 (CDT)
- Zip Code: 78582

El Mesquite is a census-designated place (CDP) in Starr County, Texas, United States. This was a new CDP for the 2010 census. As of the 2020 census, El Mesquite had a population of 50.

== Geography ==
El Mesquite is located at 26°23′5″N 98°46′18″W (26.384685, -98.771579).

== Demographics ==
Historical population
Census	Pop.	Note	%±
2010	38		—
2020	50		31.6%
U.S. Decennial Census; 1850–1900 1910; 1920 1930 1940; 1950 1960 1970; 1980 1990 2000; 2010

El Mesquite first appeared as a census designated place prior to the 2010 U.S. census.

=== 2020 census ===
El Mesquite CDP, Texas – Racial and ethnic composition Note: the US Census treats Hispanic/Latino as an ethnic category. This table excludes Latinos from the racial categories and assigns them to a separate category. Hispanics/Latinos may be of any race.
Race / Ethnicity (NH = Non-Hispanic)	Pop 2010	Pop 2020	% 2010	% 2020
White alone (NH)	0	5	0.00%	10.00%
Black or African American alone (NH)	0	0	0.00%	0.00%
Native American or Alaska Native alone (NH)	0	0	0.00%	0.00%
Asian alone (NH)	0	0	0.00%	0.00%
Native Hawaiian or Pacific Islander alone (NH)	0	0	0.00%	0.00%
Other race alone (NH)	0	0	0.00%	0.00%
Mixed race or Multiracial (NH)	0	1	0.00%	2.00%
Hispanic or Latino (any race)	38	44	100.00%	88.00%
Total	38	50	100.00%	100.00%

== Education ==
The CDP is within the Rio Grande City Grulla Independent School District (formerly Rio Grande City Consolidated Independent School District).
