= Santa Anna, Starr County, Texas =

Santa Anna, Texas
- CDP
- Interactive map of Santa Anna, Texas
- Coordinates: 26°40′9″N 98°33′28″W
- Country: United States
- State: Texas
- County: Starr

Area
  - Total: 0.7 sq mi (1.8 km^{2})
  - Land: 0.7 sq mi (1.8 km^{2})
  - Water: 0.0 sq mi (0 km^{2})

Population (2020)
  - Total: 12
  - Density: 17/sq mi (6.6/km^{2})
- Time zone: UTC-6 (Central (CST))
  - Summer (DST): UTC-5 (CDT)
- Zip Code: 78582, 78591

Santa Anna is a census-designated place (CDP) in Starr County, Texas, United States. This was a new CDP for the 2010 census, with a population of 13.

== Geography ==
Santa Anna is located at 26°40′9″N 98°33′28″W (26.669238, -98.557884).

== Demographics ==
Historical population
Census	Pop.	Note	%±
2010	13		—
2020	12		−7.7%
U.S. Decennial Census; 1850–1900 1910; 1920 1930 1940; 1950 1960 1970; 1980 1990 2000; 2010

Santa Anna first appeared as a census designated place in the 2010 U.S. census.

=== 2020 census ===
Santa Anna CDP, Texas – Racial and ethnic composition Note: the US Census treats Hispanic/Latino as an ethnic category. This table excludes Latinos from the racial categories and assigns them to a separate category. Hispanics/Latinos may be of any race.
Race / Ethnicity (NH = Non-Hispanic)	Pop 2010	Pop 2020	% 2010	% 2020
White alone (NH)	1	1	7.69%	8.33%
Black or African American alone (NH)	0	0	0.00%	0.00%
Native American or Alaska Native alone (NH)	0	0	0.00%	0.00%
Asian alone (NH)	0	0	0.00%	0.00%
Native Hawaiian or Pacific Islander alone (NH)	0	0	0.00%	0.00%
Other race alone (NH)	0	0	0.00%	0.00%
Mixed race or Multiracial (NH)	0	0	0.00%	0.00%
Hispanic or Latino (any race)	12	11	92.31%	91.67%
Total	13	12	100.00%	100.00%

== Education ==
The CDP is within the San Isidro Independent School District.
