= Airport Heights, Texas =

- Unincorporated community Census designated place
- Location within Texas
- Coordinates: 26°24′31″N 98°50′12″W
- Country: United States
- State: Texas
- County: Starr

Population (2020)
  - Total: 151
- Time zone: UTC-6 (Central (CST))
  - Summer (DST): UTC-5 (CDT)
- Zip Code: 78582
- FIPS code: 48-01500

Airport Heights is an unincorporated community and census-designated place (CDP) in Starr County, Texas, United States. It was a new CDP for the 2010 census. As of the 2020 census, Airport Heights had a population of 151.

== Geography ==
Airport Heights is located at 26°24′31″N 98°50′12″W (26.408735, -98.836695).

== Education ==
The CDP is within the Rio Grande City Grulla Independent School District (formerly Rio Grande City Consolidated Independent School District)

== Demographics ==
Historical population
Census	Pop.	Note	%±
2010	161		—
2020	151		−6.2%
U.S. Decennial Census; 1850–1900 1910; 1920 1930 1940; 1950 1960 1970; 1980 1990 2000; 2010 2020

Airport Heights first appeared as a census designated place in the 2010 U.S. census.

=== 2020 census ===
Airport Heights CDP, Texas – Racial and ethnic composition Note: the US Census treats Hispanic/Latino as an ethnic category. This table excludes Latinos from the racial categories and assigns them to a separate category. Hispanics/Latinos may be of any race.
Race / Ethnicity (NH = Non-Hispanic)	Pop 2010	Pop 2020	% 2010	% 2020
White alone (NH)	0	10	0.00%	6.62%
Black or African American alone (NH)	0	0	0.00%	0.00%
Native American or Alaska Native alone (NH)	0	0	0.00%	0.00%
Asian alone (NH)	0	0	0.00%	0.00%
Pacific Islander alone (NH)	0	0	0.00%	0.00%
Some Other Race alone (NH)	0	0	0.00%	0.00%
Mixed Race or Multi-Racial (NH)	1	0	0.62%	0.00%
Hispanic or Latino (any race)	160	141	99.38%	93.38%
Total	161	151	100.00%	100.00%
