= Fronton =

Fronton may refer to:

== Places ==
- Fronton, Haute-Garonne, a commune in Haute-Garonne, France
- Fronton, Texas, a small community in Starr County, Texas
- Frontón, Ciales, Puerto Rico, a barrio
- El Frontón, a Peruvian island
- Fronton Island, an island in the Rio Grande on the Mexico–United States border

== Sports ==
- Fronton (court), a playing area for Basque pelota
- Paleta Frontón, a Peruvian sport
- One-Wall Handball, a ball game also called International Fronton
