= Moraida, Texas =

- CDP
- Interactive map of Moraida, Texas
- Coordinates: 26°24′51″N 98°58′35″W
- Country: United States
- State: Texas
- County: Starr

Area
  - Total: 0.1 sq mi (0.26 km^{2})
  - Land: 0.1 sq mi (0.26 km^{2})
  - Water: 0.0 sq mi (0 km^{2})

Population (2020)
  - Total: 229
  - Density: 2,300/sq mi (880/km^{2})
- Time zone: UTC-6 (Central (CST))
  - Summer (DST): UTC-5 (CDT)
- Zip Code: 78584

Moraida is a census-designated place (CDP) in Starr County, Texas, United States. It is a new CDP, formed from part of the North Escobares CDP prior to the 2010 census. As of the 2020 census, Moraida had a population of 229.

== Geography ==
Moraida is located at 26°24′51″N 98°58′35″W (26.414278, -98.976417).

== Demographics ==
Historical population
Census	Pop.	Note	%±
2010	212		—
2020	229		8.0%
U.S. Decennial Census; 1850–1900 1910; 1920 1930 1940; 1950 1960 1970; 1980 1990 2000; 2010 2020

Moraida was formed along with Escobar I CDP, JF Villarreal CDP, Loma Vista CDP, Pena CDP, and Rivera CDP from parts of North Escobares CDP that was not incorporated into the city of Escobares. The CDP was first listed as a census designated place in the 2010 U.S. census.

=== 2020 census ===
Moraida CDP, Texas – Racial and ethnic composition Note: the US Census treats Hispanic/Latino as an ethnic category. This table excludes Latinos from the racial categories and assigns them to a separate category. Hispanics/Latinos may be of any race.
Race / Ethnicity (NH = Non-Hispanic)	Pop 2010	Pop 2020	% 2010	% 2020
White alone (NH)	11	0	5.19%	0.00%
Black or African American alone (NH)	0	0	0.00%	0.00%
Native American or Alaska Native alone (NH)	0	0	0.00%	0.00%
Asian alone (NH)	0	0	0.00%	0.00%
Pacific Islander alone (NH)	0	0	0.00%	0.00%
Some Other Race alone (NH)	0	0	0.00%	0.00%
Mixed Race or Multi-Racial (NH)	0	0	0.00%	0.00%
Hispanic or Latino (any race)	201	229	94.81%	100.00%
Total	212	229	100.00%	100.00%

== Education ==
The CDP is within the Roma Independent School District. The zoned elementary school is Veterans Memorial Elementary School. Roma High School is the district's sole comprehensive high school.
