= Escobar I, Texas =

- Neighborhood of Escobares; Former Census designated place
- Interactive map of Escobar I, Texas
- Country: United States
- State: Texas
- County: Starr

Population (2010)
  - Total: 324
- Time zone: UTC-6 (Central (CST))
  - Summer (DST): UTC-5 (CDT)

Escobar I is a neighborhood of Escobares and former census-designated place (CDP) in Starr County, Texas, United States. It was formed from part of the North Escobares CDP prior to the 2010 census with a population of 324.

== Demographics ==
Historical population
Census	Pop.	Note	%±
2010	324		—
U.S. Decennial Census; 1850–1900 1910; 1920 1930 1940; 1950 1960 1970; 1980 1990 2000; 2010

Escobar I was formed along with JF Villarreal CDP, Loma Vista CDP, Moraida CDP, Pena CDP, and Rivera CDP from parts of North Escobares CDP that was not incorporated into the city of Escobares. The CDP was first listed as a census designated place in the 2010 U.S. census. It was mostly absorbed by the city of Escobares prior to the 2020 U.S. census and delisted as a CDP.

Escobar I CDP, Texas – Racial and ethnic composition Note: the US Census treats Hispanic/Latino as an ethnic category. This table excludes Latinos from the racial categories and assigns them to a separate category. Hispanics/Latinos may be of any race.
Race / Ethnicity (NH = Non-Hispanic)	Pop 2010	% 2010
White alone (NH)	31	9.57%
Black or African American alone (NH)	0	0.00%
Native American or Alaska Native alone (NH)	4	1.23%
Asian alone (NH)	0	0.00%
Pacific Islander alone (NH)	0	0.00%
Other race alone (NH)	0	0.00%
Mixed race or Multiracial (NH)	0	0.00%
Hispanic or Latino (any race)	289	89.20%
Total	324	100.00%
