= Rivera, Texas =

- Neighborhood of Roma; Former Census designated place
- Interactive map of Rivera, Texas
- Country: United States
- State: Texas
- County: Starr

Population (2010)
  - Total: 162
- Time zone: UTC-6 (Central (CST))
  - Summer (DST): UTC-5 (CDT)

Rivera is a neighborhood of Roma and former census-designated place (CDP) in Starr County, Texas, United States. It was formed from part of the North Escobares CDP prior to the 2010 census with a population of 162.

== Demographics ==
Historical population
Census	Pop.	Note	%±
2010	162		—
U.S. Decennial Census; 1850–1900 1910; 1920 1930 1940; 1950 1960 1970; 1980 1990 2000; 2010

The Rivera CDP was formed along with JF Villarreal CDP, Loma Vista CDP, Moraida CDP, Pena CDP, and Escobar I CDP from parts of North Escobares CDP that was not incorporated into the city of Escobares. The CDP was first listed as a census designated place in the 2010 U.S. census. It was absorbed by the city of Roma prior to the 2020 U.S. census and delisted as a CDP.

Rivera CDP, Texas – Racial and ethnic composition Note: the US Census treats Hispanic/Latino as an ethnic category. This table excludes Latinos from the racial categories and assigns them to a separate category. Hispanics/Latinos may be of any race.
Race / Ethnicity (NH = Non-Hispanic)	Pop 2010	% 2010
White alone (NH)	47	29.01%
Black or African American alone (NH)	0	0.00%
Native American or Alaska Native alone (NH)	0	0.00%
Asian alone (NH)	0	0.00%
Pacific Islander alone (NH)	0	0.00%
Other race alone (NH)	0	0.00%
Mixed race or Multiracial (NH)	0	0.00%
Hispanic or Latino (any race)	115	70.99%
Total	162	100.00%
