= Los Ebanos =

Los Ebanos may refer to:

- Los Ebanos, Hidalgo County, Texas
- Los Ebanos, Starr County, Texas
