= Pena, Texas =

- Unincorporated community Census designated place
- Interactive map of Pena, Texas
- Coordinates: 26°24′56″N 98°58′12″W
- Country: United States
- State: Texas
- County: Starr

Population (2020)
  - Total: 73
- Time zone: UTC-6 (Central (CST))
  - Summer (DST): UTC-5 (CDT)
- Zip Code: 78584

Pena is an unincorporated community and census-designated place (CDP) in Starr County, Texas, United States. It was formed from part of the North Escobares CDP prior to the 2010 census. As of the 2020 census, Pena had a population of 73.

== Geography ==
Pena is located at 26°24′56″N 98°58′12″W (26.415513, -98.969979).

== Demographics ==
Historical population
Census	Pop.	Note	%±
2010	118		—
2020	73		−38.1%
U.S. Decennial Census; 1850–1900 1910; 1920 1930 1940; 1950 1960 1970; 1980 1990 2000; 2010 2020

Pena CDP was formed along with Escobar I CDP, JF Villarreal CDP, Loma Vista CDP, Moraida CDP, and Rivera CDP from parts of North Escobares CDP that was not incorporated into the city of Escobares. The CDP was first listed as a census designated place in the 2010 U.S. census.

=== 2020 census ===
Pena CDP, Texas – Racial and ethnic composition Note: the US Census treats Hispanic/Latino as an ethnic category. This table excludes Latinos from the racial categories and assigns them to a separate category. Hispanics/Latinos may be of any race.
Race / Ethnicity (NH = Non-Hispanic)	Pop 2010	Pop 2020	% 2010	% 2020
White alone (NH)	27	2	22.88%	2.74%
Black or African American alone (NH)	0	0	0.00%	0.00%
Native American or Alaska Native alone (NH)	0	0	0.00%	0.00%
Asian alone (NH)	0	0	0.00%	0.00%
Native Hawaiian or Pacific Islander alone (NH)	0	0	0.00%	0.00%
Other race alone (NH)	0	0	0.00%	0.00%
Mixed race or Multiracial (NH)	0	0	0.00%	0.00%
Hispanic or Latino (any race)	91	71	77.12%	97.26%
Total	118	73	100.00%	100.00%

== Education ==
The CDP is within the Roma Independent School District. The zoned elementary school is Veterans Memorial Elementary School. Roma High School is the district's sole comprehensive high school.
