= Rancho Viejo =

Rancho Viejo may refer to:

== Dominican Republic ==
- Rancho Viejo, Puerto Plata, Dominican Republic
- Rancho Viejo, La Vega, Dominican Republic

== United States ==
- Rancho Mission Viejo, California, often called Rancho Viejo by locals
- Rancho Viejo, Texas
- Rancho Viejo, Starr County, Texas
