= Guadalupe-Guerra, Texas =

- CDP
- Interactive map of Guadalupe-Guerra, Texas
- Coordinates: 26°24′39″N 99°4′55″W
- Country: United States
- State: Texas
- County: Starr

Population (2020)
  - Total: 60
- Time zone: UTC-6 (Central (CST))
  - Summer (DST): UTC-5 (CDT)
- Zip Code: 78584

Guadalupe-Guerra is a census-designated place (CDP) in Starr County, Texas, United States. It is a new CDP, formed from part of the Fronton CDP prior to the 2010 census, with a population of 37.

== Geography ==
Guadalupe-Guerra is located at 26°24′39″N 99°4′55″W (26.410816, -99.081881).

== Demographics ==
Historical population
Census	Pop.	Note	%±
2010	37		—
2020	60		62.2%
U.S. Decennial Census; 1850–1900 1910; 1920 1930 1940; 1950 1960 1970; 1980 1990 2000; 2010

Guadalupe-Guerra first appeared as a census designated place in the 2010 U.S. census, one of three CDPs (Guadalupe-Guerra, Sandoval, Sunset) carved out of the Fronton CDP.

=== 2020 census ===
Guadalupe-Guerra CDP, Texas – Racial and ethnic composition Note: the US Census treats Hispanic/Latino as an ethnic category. This table excludes Latinos from the racial categories and assigns them to a separate category. Hispanics/Latinos may be of any race.
Race / Ethnicity (NH = Non-Hispanic)	Pop 2010	Pop 2020	% 2010	% 2020
White alone (NH)	0	5	0.00%	8.33%
Black or African American alone (NH)	0	0	0.00%	0.00%
Native American or Alaska Native alone (NH)	0	0	0.00%	0.00%
Asian alone (NH)	0	0	0.00%	0.00%
Native Hawaiian or Pacific Islander alone (NH)	0	0	0.00%	0.00%
Other race alone (NH)	0	0	0.00%	0.00%
Mixed race or Multiracial (NH)	0	0	0.00%	0.00%
Hispanic or Latino (any race)	37	55	100.00%	91.67%
Total	37	60	100.00%	100.00%
