= El Quiote, Texas =

- CDP
- Interactive map of El Quiote, Texas
- Coordinates: 26°23′4″N 98°54′30″W
- Country: United States
- State: Texas
- County: Starr

Area
  - Total: 0.1 sq mi (0.26 km^{2})
  - Land: 0.1 sq mi (0.26 km^{2})
  - Water: 0.0 sq mi (0 km^{2})

Population (2020)
  - Total: 226
  - Density: 2,300/sq mi (870/km^{2})
- Time zone: UTC-6 (Central (CST))
  - Summer (DST): UTC-5 (CDT)
- Zip Code: 78582

El Quiote is a census-designated place (CDP) in Starr County, Texas, United States. It is a new CDP, formed from part of the Los Alvarez CDP prior to the 2010 census, and had a population of 226 as of the 2020 census.

== Geography ==
El Quiote is located at 26°23′4″N 98°54′30″W (26.384490, -98.908378).

== Demographics ==
Historical population
Census	Pop.	Note	%±
2010	208		—
2020	226		8.7%
U.S. Decennial Census; 1850–1900 1910; 1920 1930 1940; 1950 1960 1970; 1980 1990 2000; 2010

El Quiote first appeared as a census designated place in the 2010 U.S. census after being carved out along with 3 other CDPs (Barrera, Flor del Rio, and Palo Blanco) from the Los Alvarez CDP.

=== 2020 census ===
El Quiote CDP, Texas – Racial and ethnic composition Note: the US Census treats Hispanic/Latino as an ethnic category. This table excludes Latinos from the racial categories and assigns them to a separate category. Hispanics/Latinos may be of any race.
Race / Ethnicity (NH = Non-Hispanic)	Pop 2010	Pop 2020	% 2010	% 2020
White alone (NH)	0	2	0.00%	0.88%
Black or African American alone (NH)	0	0	0.00%	0.00%
Native American or Alaska Native alone (NH)	0	0	0.00%	0.00%
Asian alone (NH)	0	0	0.00%	0.00%
Pacific Islander alone (NH)	0	0	0.00%	0.00%
Some Other Race alone (NH)	0	0	0.00%	0.00%
Mixed Race or Multi-Racial (NH)	0	1	0.00%	0.44%
Hispanic or Latino (any race)	208	223	100.00%	98.67%
Total	208	226	100.00%	100.00%

== Education ==
The CDP is within the Roma Independent School District. The zoned elementary school is Delia Gonzalez (DG) Garcia Elementary School. Roma High School is the district's sole comprehensive high school.
