= Roma Creek, Texas =

- Neighborhood of Roma; Former census designated place
- Coordinates: 26°25′9″N 99°1′6.5″W
- Country: United States
- State: Texas
- County: Starr

Area
  - Total: 0.2 sq mi (0.52 km^{2})
  - Land: 0.2 sq mi (0.52 km^{2})
  - Water: 0.0 sq mi (0 km^{2})
- Elevation: 249 ft (76 m)

Population (2010)
  - Total: 350
  - Density: 1,800/sq mi (680/km^{2})
- Time zone: UTC-6 (Central (CST))
  - Summer (DST): UTC-5 (CDT)
- Zip Code: 78584
- FIPS code: 48-63026
- GNIS feature ID: 1852761

Roma Creek is a former census-designated place (CDP) in Starr County, Texas, United States. The population was 350 at the 2010 census down from 610 at the 2000 census.

As of the 2020 U.S. census, the 2010 version of the CDP became a part of Roma.

== Geography ==
Roma Creek is located at 26°25′9″N 99°1′6.5″W (26.419189, -99.018475).

Roma Creek was first listed as a census designated place in the 2000 U.S. census. Prior to the 2010 U.S. census, portions of Roma Creek were annexed to the city of Roma and parts were taken to form three new CDPs (Evergreen, Fronton Ranchettes, and Ramos). As a result, the total area was reduced to 0.2 square miles (0.5 km^{2}), all land. The remainder of the CDP was absorbed by the city of Roma prior to the 2020 U.S. census.

== Demographics ==
Historical population
Census	Pop.	Note	%±
2000	610		—
2010	350		−42.6%
U.S. Decennial Census; 1850–1900 1910; 1920 1930 1940; 1950 1960 1970; 1980 1990 2000; 2010

Roma Creek first appeared as a census designated place in the 2000 U.S. census. Parts of the CDP were used to form the Evergreen CDP, Fronton Ranchettes CDP and Ramos CDP prior to the 2010 U.S. census. The CDP was deleted after the remainder was absorbed into the city of Roma prior to the 2020 U.S. census.

=== 2010 census ===
Roma Creek CDP, Texas – Racial and ethnic composition Note: the US Census treats Hispanic/Latino as an ethnic category. This table excludes Latinos from the racial categories and assigns them to a separate category. Hispanics/Latinos may be of any race.
Race / Ethnicity (NH = Non-Hispanic)	Pop 2000	Pop 2010	% 2000	% 2010
White alone (NH)	0	1	0.00%	0.29%
Black or African American alone (NH)	0	0	0.00%	0.00%
Native American or Alaska Native alone (NH)	0	0	0.00%	0.00%
Asian alone (NH)	0	0	0.00%	0.00%
Pacific Islander alone (NH)	0	0	0.00%	0.00%
Some Other Race alone (NH)	0	0	0.00%	0.00%
Mixed Race or Multi-Racial (NH)	0	0	0.00%	0.00%
Hispanic or Latino (any race)	610	349	100.00%	99.71%
Total	610	350	100.00%	100.00%

As of the census of 2000, there were 610 people, 141 households, and 133 families residing in the CDP. The population density was 117.5 inhabitants per square mile (45.4/km^{2}). There were 161 housing units at an average density of 31.0 per square mile (12.0/km^{2}). The racial makeup of the CDP was 97.54% White, 0.16% African American, 1.15% from other races, and 1.15% from two or more races. Hispanic or Latino of any race were 100.00% of the population.

There were 141 households, out of which 70.2% had children under the age of 18 living with them, 76.6% were married couples living together, 17.0% had a female householder with no husband present, and 5.0% were non-families. 4.3% of all households were made up of individuals, and 2.1% had someone living alone who was 65 years of age or older. The average household size was 4.24 and the average family size was 4.39.

In the CDP, the population was spread out, with 42.6% under the age of 18, 9.2% from 18 to 24, 32.1% from 25 to 44, 10.2% from 45 to 64, and 5.9% who were 65 years of age or older. The median age was 23 years. For every 100 females, there were 87.7 males. For every 100 females age 18 and over, there were 88.2 males.

The median income for a household in the CDP was $12,750, and the median income for a family was $12,270. Males had a median income of $11,250 versus $0 for females. The per capita income for the CDP was $5,062. About 63.2% of families and 66.7% of the population were below the poverty line, including 75.1% of those under age 18 and 61.5% of those age 65 or over.

== Education ==
Public education in the community of Roma Creek is provided by the Roma Independent School District. The zoned elementary school for the 2010 Census community is Emma Vera Elementary School. Roma High School is the district's sole comprehensive high school.

Zoned campuses for the former Roma Creek, in 2009–2010, included Anna S. Canavan Elementary School (pre-kindergarten), Emma Vera Elementary School (grades K-5), Roma Middle School (grades 6–8), and Roma High School (grades 9–12).
