= Palo Blanco, Texas =

- CDP
- Interactive map of Palo Blanco, Texas
- Coordinates: 26°23′15″N 98°54′9″W
- Country: United States
- State: Texas
- County: Starr

Area
  - Total: 0.1 sq mi (0.26 km^{2})
  - Land: 0.1 sq mi (0.26 km^{2})
  - Water: 0.0 sq mi (0 km^{2})

Population (2020)
  - Total: 238
  - Density: 2,400/sq mi (920/km^{2})
- Time zone: UTC-6 (Central (CST))
  - Summer (DST): UTC-5 (CDT)
- Zip Code: 78582

Palo Blanco is a census-designated place (CDP) in Starr County, Texas, United States. It is a new CDP, formed from part of the Los Alvarez CDP prior to the 2010 census. As of the 2020 census, Palo Blanco had a population of 238.

== Geography ==
Palo Blanco is located at 26°23′15″N 98°54′9″W (26.387546, -98.902408).

== Demographics ==
Historical population
Census	Pop.	Note	%±
2010	204		—
2020	238		16.7%
U.S. Decennial Census; 1850–1900 1910; 1920 1930 1940; 1950 1960 1970; 1980 1990 2000; 2010

Palo Blanco first appeared as a census designated place in the 2010 U.S. census after being carved out along with 3 other CDPs (Barrera, El Quiote, and Flor del Rio) from the Los Alvarez CDP.

=== 2020 census ===
Palo Blanco CDP, Texas – Racial and ethnic composition Note: the US Census treats Hispanic/Latino as an ethnic category. This table excludes Latinos from the racial categories and assigns them to a separate category. Hispanics/Latinos may be of any race.
Race / Ethnicity (NH = Non-Hispanic)	Pop 2010	Pop 2020	% 2010	% 2020
White alone (NH)	4	0	1.96%	0.00%
Black or African American alone (NH)	0	0	0.00%	0.00%
Native American or Alaska Native alone (NH)	0	0	0.00%	0.00%
Asian alone (NH)	0	0	0.00%	0.00%
Pacific Islander alone (NH)	0	0	0.00%	0.00%
Some Other Race alone (NH)	0	0	0.00%	0.00%
Mixed Race or Multi-Racial (NH)	1	0	0.49%	0.00%
Hispanic or Latino (any race)	199	238	97.55%	100.00%
Total	204	238	100.00%	100.00%

== Education ==
The CDP is within the Roma Independent School District. The zoned elementary school is Delia Gonzalez (DG) Garcia Elementary School. Roma High School is the district's sole comprehensive high school.
