= Campo Verde, Texas =

- CDP
- Interactive map of Campo Verde, Texas
- Coordinates: 26°23′30″N 98°54′50″W
- Country: United States
- State: Texas
- County: Starr

Population (2020)
  - Total: 111
- Time zone: UTC-6 (Central (CST))
  - Summer (DST): UTC-5 (CDT)
- Zip Code: 78582
- FIPS code: 48-12226

Campo Verde is a census-designated place (CDP) in Starr County, Texas, United States. It is a new CDP, formed from part of the La Rosita CDP prior to the 2010 census. As of the 2020 census, Campo Verde had a population of 111.

== Geography ==
Campo Verde is located at 26°23′30″N 98°54′50″W (26.391630, -98.913980).

== Education ==
The CDP is within the Roma Independent School District. The zoned elementary school is Delia Gonzalez (DG) Garcia Elementary School. Roma High School is the district's sole comprehensive high school.

== Demographics ==
Historical population
Census	Pop.	Note	%±
2010	132		—
2020	111		−15.9%
U.S. Decennial Census; 1850–1900 1910; 1920 1930 1940; 1950 1960 1970; 1980 1990 2000; 2010 2020

Campo Verde was first listed as a census designated place in the 2010 U.S. census, one of ten new CDPs (Anacua, Campo Verde, El Cenizo, Hilltop, La Chuparosa, Los Barreras, Los Ebanos, Miguel Barrera, Rancho Viejo, and Tierra Dorada) carved out of the La Rosita CDP.

=== 2020 census ===
Campo Verde CDP, Texas – Racial and ethnic composition Note: the US Census treats Hispanic/Latino as an ethnic category. This table excludes Latinos from the racial categories and assigns them to a separate category. Hispanics/Latinos may be of any race.
Race / Ethnicity (NH = Non-Hispanic)	Pop 2010	Pop 2020	% 2010	% 2020
White alone (NH)	0	1	0.00%	0.90%
Black or African American alone (NH)	0	0	0.00%	0.00%
Native American or Alaska Native alone (NH)	0	0	0.00%	0.00%
Asian alone (NH)	0	0	0.00%	0.00%
Native Hawaiian or Pacific Islander alone (NH)	0	0	0.00%	0.00%
Other race alone (NH)	0	0	0.00%	0.00%
Mixed race or Multiracial (NH)	0	0	0.00%	0.00%
Hispanic or Latino (any race)	132	110	100.00%	99.10%
Total	132	111	100.00%	100.00%
