= El Cenizo, Starr County, Texas =

El Cenizo, Texas
- CDP
- Interactive map of El Cenizo, Texas
- Coordinates: 26°24′38″N 98°54′57″W
- Country: United States
- State: Texas
- County: Starr

Population (2020)
  - Total: 273
- Time zone: UTC-6 (Central (CST))
  - Summer (DST): UTC-5 (CDT)
- Zip Code: 78582

El Cenizo is a census-designated place (CDP) in Starr County, Texas, United States. It is a new CDP, formed from part of the La Rosita CDP prior to the 2010 census, with a population of 249.

== Geography ==
El Cenizo is located at 26°24′38″N 98°54′57″W (26.410571, -98.915845).

== Demographics ==
Historical population
Census	Pop.	Note	%±
2010	249		—
2020	273		9.6%
U.S. Decennial Census; 1850–1900 1910; 1920 1930 1940; 1950 1960 1970; 1980 1990 2000; 2010 2020

El Cenizo was first listed as a census designated place in the 2010 U.S. census, one of ten new CDPs (Anacua, Campo Verde, El Cenizo, Hilltop, La Chuparosa, Los Barreras, Los Ebanos, Miguel Barrera, Rancho Viejo, and Tierra Dorada) carved out of the La Rosita CDP.

=== 2020 census ===
El Cenizo CDP, Texas – Racial and ethnic composition Note: the US Census treats Hispanic/Latino as an ethnic category. This table excludes Latinos from the racial categories and assigns them to a separate category. Hispanics/Latinos may be of any race.
Race / Ethnicity (NH = Non-Hispanic)	Pop 2010	Pop 2020	% 2010	% 2020
White alone (NH)	0	3	0.00%	1.10%
Black or African American alone (NH)	0	0	0.00%	0.00%
Native American or Alaska Native alone (NH)	0	0	0.00%	0.00%
Asian alone (NH)	0	0	0.00%	0.00%
Pacific Islander alone (NH)	0	0	0.00%	0.00%
Some Other Race alone (NH)	0	0	0.00%	0.00%
Mixed Race or Multi-Racial (NH)	0	0	0.00%	0.00%
Hispanic or Latino (any race)	249	270	100.00%	98.90%
Total	249	273	100.00%	100.00%

== Education ==
The CDP is within the Roma Independent School District. The zoned elementary school for the 2010 Census community is Delia Gonzalez (DG) Garcia Elementary School. Roma High School is the district's sole comprehensive high school.
