= Lago Vista, Starr County, Texas =

Lago Vista, Texas
- CDP
- Interactive map of Lago Vista, Texas
- Coordinates: 26°33′52″N 99°6′28″W
- Country: United States
- State: Texas
- County: Starr

Area
  - Total: 0.4 sq mi (1.0 km^{2})
  - Land: 0.4 sq mi (1.0 km^{2})
  - Water: 0.0 sq mi (0 km^{2})

Population (2020)
  - Total: 133
  - Density: 330/sq mi (130/km^{2})
- Time zone: UTC-6 (Central (CST))
  - Summer (DST): UTC-5 (CDT)
- Zip Code: 78545, 78584

Lago Vista is a census-designated place (CDP) in Starr County, Texas, United States. It is a new CDP, formed from part of the Falcon Heights CDP prior to the 2010 census. The CDP had a population of 133 in the 2020 census, up from 115 in the 2010 census.

== Geography ==
Lago Vista is located at 26°33′52″N 99°6′28″W (26.564322, -99.107766).

== Demographics ==
Historical population
Census	Pop.	Note	%±
2010	115		—
2020	133		15.7%
U.S. Decennial Census; 1850–1900 1910; 1920 1930 1940; 1950 1960 1970; 1980 1990 2000; 2010 2020

Lago Vista was first listed as a census designated place in the 2010 U.S. census, one of four new CDPs (Falconaire, H. Cuellar Estates, Indio, Lago Vista) carved out from the Falcon Heights CDP.

=== 2020 census ===
Lago Vista CDP, Texas – Racial and ethnic composition Note: the US Census treats Hispanic/Latino as an ethnic category. This table excludes Latinos from the racial categories and assigns them to a separate category. Hispanics/Latinos may be of any race.
Race / Ethnicity (NH = Non-Hispanic)	Pop 2010	Pop 2020	% 2010	% 2020
White alone (NH)	2	1	1.74%	0.75%
Black or African American alone (NH)	0	0	0.00%	0.00%
Native American or Alaska Native alone (NH)	0	0	0.00%	0.00%
Asian alone (NH)	0	0	0.00%	0.00%
Pacific Islander alone (NH)	0	0	0.00%	0.00%
Some Other Race alone (NH)	0	0	0.00%	0.00%
Mixed Race or Multi-Racial (NH)	0	0	0.00%	9.09%
Hispanic or Latino (any race)	113	132	98.26%	99.25%
Total	115	133	100.00%	100.00%

== Education ==
The CDP is within the Roma Independent School District. The zoned elementary school for the 2010 Census community is Emma Vera Elementary School. Roma High School is the district's sole comprehensive high school.
