= San Juan, Starr County, Texas =

San Juan, Texas
- CDP
- Interactive map of San Juan, Texas
- Coordinates: 26°24′54″N 98°56′37″W
- Country: United States
- State: Texas
- County: Starr

Population (2020)
  - Total: 203
- Time zone: UTC-6 (Central (CST))
  - Summer (DST): UTC-5 (CDT)
- Zip Code: 78584

San Juan is a census-designated place (CDP) in Starr County, Texas, United States. It is a new CDP formed from part of the Garceno CDP prior to the 2010 census, with a population of 129.

== Geography ==
San Juan is located at 26°24′54″N 98°56′37″W (26.414966, -98.943691).

== Demographics ==
Historical population
Census	Pop.	Note	%±
2010	129		—
2020	203		57.4%
U.S. Decennial Census; 1850–1900 1910; 1920 1930 1940; 1950 1960 1970; 1980 1990 2000; 2010

San Juan first appeared in the 2010 U.S. census after being carved out from part of the Garceno CDP.

=== 2020 census ===
San Juan CDP, Texas – Racial and ethnic composition Note: the US Census treats Hispanic/Latino as an ethnic category. This table excludes Latinos from the racial categories and assigns them to a separate category. Hispanics/Latinos may be of any race.
Race / Ethnicity (NH = Non-Hispanic)	Pop 2010	Pop 2020	% 2010	% 2020
White alone (NH)	15	0	11.63%	0.00%
Black or African American alone (NH)	0	0	0.00%	0.00%
Native American or Alaska Native alone (NH)	0	0	0.00%	0.00%
Asian alone (NH)	0	0	0.00%	0.00%
Pacific Islander alone (NH)	0	0	0.00%	0.00%
Some Other Race alone (NH)	0	3	0.00%	1.48%
Mixed Race or Multi-Racial (NH)	0	0	0.00%	0.00%
Hispanic or Latino (any race)	114	200	88.37%	98.52%
Total	129	203	100.00%	100.00%

== Education ==
The CDP is within the Roma Independent School District. The zoned elementary school is R. T. Barrera Elementary School. Roma High School is the district's sole comprehensive high school.
