= Falcon Heights, Texas =

- CDP
- Interactive map of Falcon Heights, Texas
- Location in Texas Location in the United States
- Coordinates: 26°33′37″N 99°7′21″W
- Country: United States
- State: Texas
- County: Starr

Area
  - Total: 0.1 sq mi (0.26 km^{2})
  - Land: 0.1 sq mi (0.26 km^{2})
  - Water: 0.0 sq mi (0 km^{2})
- Elevation: 272 ft (83 m)

Population (2020)
  - Total: 18
  - Density: 180/sq mi (69/km^{2})
- Time zone: UTC-6 (Central (CST))
  - Summer (DST): UTC-5 (CDT)
- ZIP code: 78545, 78584
- Area code: 956
- FIPS code: 48-25344
- GNIS feature ID: 1335664

Falcon Heights is a census-designated place (CDP) in Starr County, Texas, United States. The population was 18 at the 2020 census, down from 53 at the 2010 census.

The Lake Falcon Dam International Crossing connects Falcon Heights with Nueva Ciudad Guerrero, Tamaulipas.

== Geography ==
Falcon Heights is located at 26°33′37″N 99°7′21″W (26.560372, -99.122493).

Prior to the 2010 census, Falcon Heights CDP had parts taken to form new CDPs and lost additional area. As a result, the total area was reduced to 0.1 square miles (0.3 km^{2}), all land.

== Demographics ==
Historical population
Census	Pop.	Note	%±
2000	335		—
2010	53		−84.2%
2020	18		−66.0%
U.S. Decennial Census; 1850–1900 1910; 1920 1930 1940; 1950 1960 1970; 1980 1990 2000; 2010

Falcon Heights was first listed as a census designated place in the 2000 U.S. census. Prior to the 2010 U.S. census, four new CDPs were carved out from its territory (Falconaire, H. Cuellar Estates, Indio, Lago Vista) substantially reducing its population.

=== 2020 census ===
Falcon Heights CDP, Texas – Racial and ethnic composition Note: the US Census treats Hispanic/Latino as an ethnic category. This table excludes Latinos from the racial categories and assigns them to a separate category. Hispanics/Latinos may be of any race.
Race / Ethnicity (NH = Non-Hispanic)	Pop 2000	Pop 2010	Pop 2020	% 2000	% 2010	% 2020
White alone (NH)	17	3	1	5.07%	5.66%	5.56%
Black or African American alone (NH)	0	0	0	0.00%	0.00%	0.00%
Native American or Alaska Native alone (NH)	0	0	0	0.00%	0.00%	0.00%
Asian alone (NH)	0	0	0	0.00%	0.00%	0.00%
Native Hawaiian or Pacific Islander alone (NH)	0	0	0	0.00%	0.00%	0.00%
Other race alone (NH)	0	0	0	0.00%	0.00%	0.00%
Mixed race or Multiracial (NH)	0	0	0	0.00%	0.00%	0.00%
Hispanic or Latino (any race)	318	50	17	99.25%	94.34%	94.44%
Total	335	53	18	100.00%	100.00%	100.00%

At the 2000 census there were 335 people, 99 households, and 81 families in the CDP. The population density was 76.4 inhabitants per square mile (29.5/km^{2}). There were 152 housing units at an average density of 34.7 per square mile (13.4/km^{2}). The racial makeup of the CDP was 99.70% White, 0.30% from other races. Hispanic or Latino of any race were 94.93%.

Of the 99 households 50.5% had children under the age of 18 living with them, 73.7% were married couples living together, 7.1% had a female householder with no husband present, and 17.2% were non-families. 17.2% of households were one person and 13.1% were one person aged 65 or older. The average household size was 3.38 and the average family size was 3.85.

The age distribution was 37.6% under the age of 18, 7.8% from 18 to 24, 26.9% from 25 to 44, 15.2% from 45 to 64, and 12.5% 65 or older. The median age was 29 years. For every 100 females, there were 91.4 males. For every 100 females age 18 and over, there were 88.3 males.

The median household income was $15,000 and the median family income was $15,909. Males had a median income of $0 versus $0 for females. The per capita income for the CDP was $5,898. About 48.1% of families and 52.9% of the population were below the poverty line, including 66.1% of those under age 18 and none of those age 65 or over.

== Education ==
Public education in the community of Falcon Heights is provided by the Roma Independent School District. The zoned elementary school for the 2010 Census community is Emma Vera Elementary School. Roma High School is the district's sole comprehensive high school.

Zoned campuses in 2009-2010 included Anna S. Canavan Elementary School (pre-kindergarten), Emma Vera Elementary School (grades K-5), Roma Middle School (grades 6–8), and Roma High School (grades 9–12).
