= Roma Independent School District =

School district in Texas, United States

Address
- 608 North Garcia Street Roma, Texas, 78584; United States

District information
- Grades: PK–12
- Schools: 10
- NCES District ID: 4837740

Students and staff
- Students: 5,932 (2023–2024)
- Teachers: 449.16 (on an FTE basis)
- Student–teacher ratio: 13.21:1

Other information
- Website: romaisd.com

Roma Independent School District is a public school district based in Roma, Texas (USA). The district currently serves over 6,000 students.

In 2009, the school district was rated "academically acceptable" by the Texas Education Agency.

== Catchment area ==
In addition to the city of Roma, the district serves students residing in Escobares and various census-designated places in western Starr County. CDPs served by Roma include:

- Anacua
- Barrera (portion)
- Benjamin Perez
- Campo Verde
- Casas
- Chapeno
- El Cenizo
- El Quiote
- Evergreen
- Falcon Heights
- Falcon Village
- Falconaire
- Flor del Rio
- Fronton
- Fronton Ranchettes
- Garceno
- Guadalupe Guerra
- H. Cuellar Estates
- Hilltop
- Indio
- Jardin de San Julian
- JF Villarreal
- La Chuparosa
- La Esperanza
- La Loma de Falcon
- La Minita
- La Rosita
- Lago Vista
- Loma Linda West
- Loma Vista
- Los Alvarez (about half)
- Los Arrieros
- Los Barreras
- Los Ebanos
- Mesquite
- Miguel Barrera
- Moraida
- North Escobares
- Palo Blanco
- Pena
- Ramos
- Rancho Viejo
- Regino Ramirez
- Salineño
- Salineño North
- San Juan
- Sandoval
- Sunset
- Tierra Dorada

Former CDPs:

- Los Alvarez (most of the former CDP)
- Los Villareales (partial)
- Roma Creek - the 2010 version of the CDP is now, as of 2020, entirely in the city of Roma
- 2000s boundary of Roma Creek

== Schools ==
High school (Grades 9-12)

- Roma High School

Middle schools (Grades 6-8)

- Roma Middle School
- Ramiro Barrera Middle School

Elementary schools (Grades PK-5)

- R.T. Barrera Elementary School
- Delia Gonzalez Garcia Elementary School (Formerly Ynes B. Escobar Elementary School)
- Roel & Celia Saenz Elementary School
- F.J. Scott Elementary School
- Emma Vera Elementary School
- Veterans Memorial Elementary School

Other campuses

- Instructional and Guidance School (ALAS)

Former schools

- Anna S. Canavan Elementary School
