= Barrera, Texas =

- CDP
- Interactive map of Barrera, Texas
- Coordinates: 26°23′33″N 98°53′55″W
- Country: United States
- State: Texas
- County: Starr

Population (2020)
  - Total: 122
- Time zone: UTC-6 (Central (CST))
  - Summer (DST): UTC-5 (CDT)
- Zip Code: 78582
- FIPS code: 48-05690

Barrera is a census-designated place (CDP) in Starr County, Texas, United States. It is a new CDP, formed from part of the Los Alvarez CDP prior to the 2010 census. As of the 2020 census, Barrera had a population of 122.

== Geography ==
Barrera is located at 26°23′33″N 98°53′55″W (26.392541, -98.898505).

== Education ==
Most of the CDP lies within the Roma Independent School District, while a portion is in the Rio Grande City Grulla Independent School District (formerly Rio Grande City Consolidated Independent School District). The zoned elementary school for the Roma section is Delia Gonzalez (DG) Garcia Elementary School. Roma High School is the Roma district's sole comprehensive high school.

== Demographics ==
Historical population
Census	Pop.	Note	%±
2010	108		—
2020	122		13.0%
U.S. Decennial Census; 1850–1900 1910; 1920 1930 1940; 1950 1960 1970; 1980 1990 2000; 2010

Barrera first appeared as a census designated place in the 2010 U.S. census after being carved out along with 3 other CDPs (El Quiote, Flor del Rio, and Palo Blanco) from the Los Alvarez CDP.

=== 2020 census ===
Barrera CDP, Texas – Racial and ethnic composition Note: the US Census treats Hispanic/Latino as an ethnic category. This table excludes Latinos from the racial categories and assigns them to a separate category. Hispanics/Latinos may be of any race.
Race / Ethnicity (NH = Non-Hispanic)	Pop 2010	Pop 2020	% 2010	% 2020
White alone (NH)	1	7	0.93%	5.74%
Black or African American alone (NH)	0	0	0.00%	0.00%
Native American or Alaska Native alone (NH)	0	0	0.00%	0.00%
Asian alone (NH)	0	0	0.00%	0.00%
Native Hawaiian or Pacific Islander alone (NH)	0	0	0.00%	0.00%
Other race alone (NH)	0	1	0.00%	0.82%
Mixed race or Multiracial (NH)	0	0	0.00%	0.00%
Hispanic or Latino (any race)	107	114	99.07%	93.44%
Total	108	122	100.00%	100.00%
