= Regino Ramirez, Texas =

- CDP
- Interactive map of Regino Ramirez, Texas
- Coordinates: 26°29′17″N 98°56′2″W
- Country: United States
- State: Texas
- County: Starr

Population (2020)
  - Total: 120
- Time zone: UTC-6 (Central (CST))
  - Summer (DST): UTC-5 (CDT)
- Zip Code: 78584

Regino Ramirez is a census-designated place (CDP) in Starr County, Texas, United States. It was a new CDP for the 2010 census. As of the 2020 census, Regino Ramirez had a population of 120.

== Geography ==
Regino Ramirez is located at 26°29′17″N 98°56′2″W (26.487985, -98.933774).

== Education ==
The CDP is within the Roma Independent School District.

== Demographics ==
Historical population
Census	Pop.	Note	%±
2010	85		—
2020	120		41.2%
U.S. Decennial Census; 1850–1900 1910; 1920 1930 1940; 1950 1960 1970; 1980 1990 2000; 2010

Regino Ramirez first appeared as a census designated place in the 2010 U.S. census.

=== 2020 census ===
Regino Ramirez CDP, Texas – Racial and ethnic composition Note: the US Census treats Hispanic/Latino as an ethnic category. This table excludes Latinos from the racial categories and assigns them to a separate category. Hispanics/Latinos may be of any race.
Race / Ethnicity (NH = Non-Hispanic)	Pop 2010	Pop 2020	% 2010	% 2020
White alone (NH)	0	0	0.00%	0.00%
Black or African American alone (NH)	0	0	0.00%	0.00%
Native American or Alaska Native alone (NH)	0	0	0.00%	0.00%
Asian alone (NH)	0	0	0.00%	0.00%
Native Hawaiian or Pacific Islander alone (NH)	0	0	0.00%	0.00%
Other race alone (NH)	0	1	0.00%	0.83%
Mixed race or Multiracial (NH)	0	0	0.00%	0.00%
Hispanic or Latino (any race)	85	119	100.00%	99.17%
Total	85	120	100.00%	100.00%
