= Salineño, Texas =

- CDP
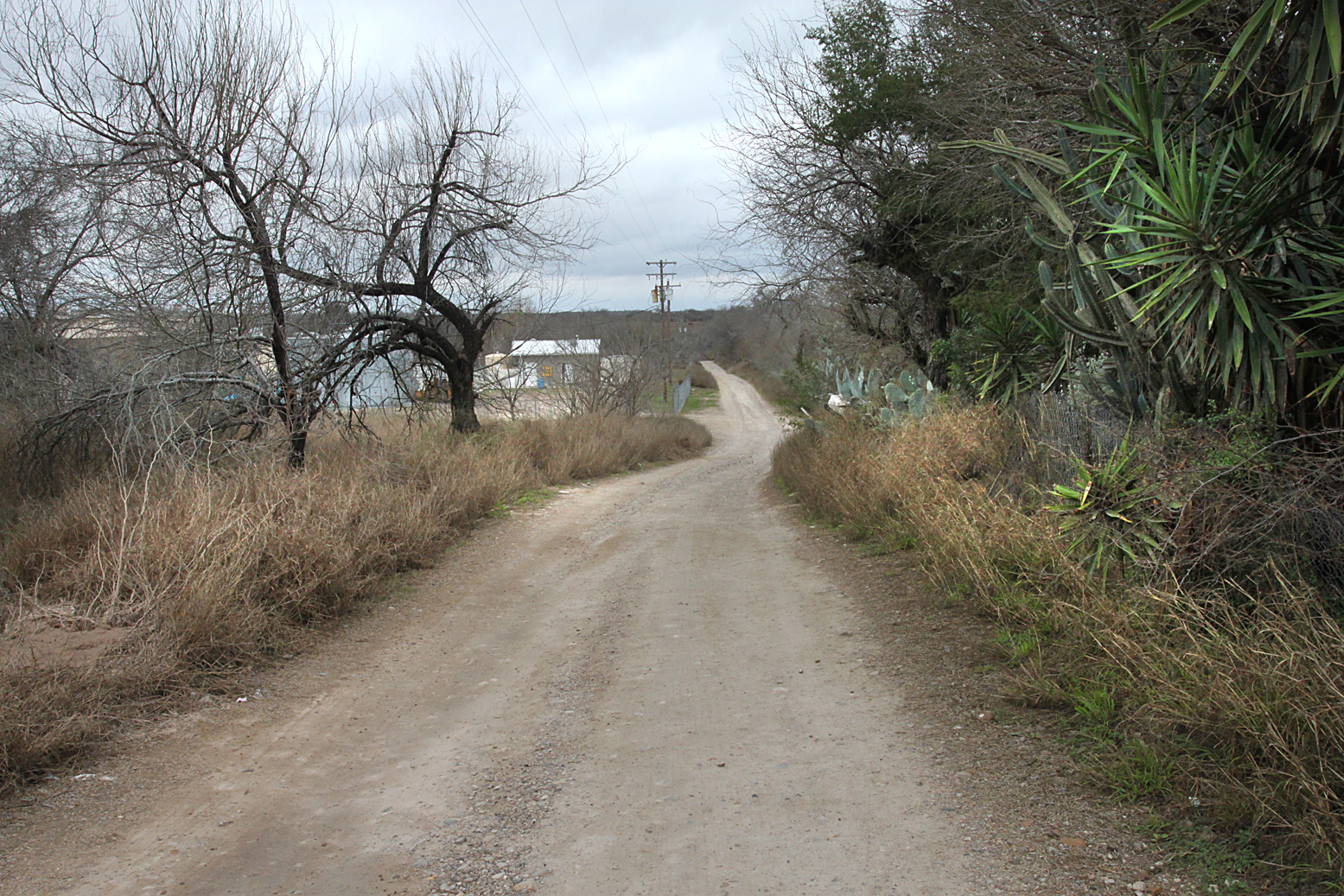

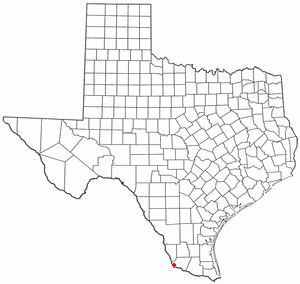
- Location of Salineno, Texas

- Coordinates: 26°31′3″N 99°6′43″W
- Country: United States
- State: Texas
- County: Starr

Area
  - Total: 0.1 sq mi (0.26 km^{2})
  - Land: 0.1 sq mi (0.26 km^{2})
  - Water: 0.0 sq mi (0 km^{2})
- Elevation: 220 ft (67 m)

Population (2020)
  - Total: 176
  - Density: 1,800/sq mi (680/km^{2})
- Time zone: UTC-6 (Central (CST))
  - Summer (DST): UTC-5 (CDT)
- ZIP code: 78585
- Area code: 956
- FIPS code: 48-64316
- GNIS feature ID: 1346183

Salineño is a census-designated place (CDP) in Starr County, Texas, United States. The name was changed in 2008, adding a tilde over the second n. The population was 176 at the 2020 census, down from 201 at the 2010 census.

== Geography ==
Salineño is located at 26°31′3″N 99°6′43″W (26.517553, -99.112058).

The CDP lost area before the 2010 census, bringing the total area down to 0.1 square miles (0.3 km^{2}), all land.

== Demographics ==
Historical population
Census	Pop.	Note	%±
2000	304		—
2010	201		−33.9%
2020	176		−12.4%
U.S. Decennial Census; 1850–1900 1910; 1920 1930 1940; 1950 1960 1970; 1980 1990 2000; 2010

Salineño was first listed as a census designated place in the 2000 U.S. census. The tilde was added to its name in the 2010 U.S. census.

=== 2020 census ===
Salineño CDP, Texas – Racial and ethnic composition Note: the US Census treats Hispanic/Latino as an ethnic category. This table excludes Latinos from the racial categories and assigns them to a separate category. Hispanics/Latinos may be of any race.
Race / Ethnicity (NH = Non-Hispanic)	Pop 2000	Pop 2010	Pop 2020	% 2000	% 2010	% 2020
White alone (NH)	2	13	3	0.66%	6.47%	1.70%
Black or African American alone (NH)	0	0	0	0.00%	0.00%	0.00%
Native American or Alaska Native alone (NH)	0	0	0	0.00%	0.00%	0.00%
Asian alone (NH)	0	0	0	0.00%	0.00%	0.00%
Pacific Islander alone (NH)	0	0	0	0.00%	0.00%	0.00%
Some Other Race alone (NH)	0	0	0	0.00%	0.00%	0.00%
Mixed race or Multiracial (NH)	0	0	0	0.00%	0.00%	0.00%
Hispanic or Latino (any race)	302	188	173	99.34%	93.53%	98.30%
Total	304	201	176	100.00%	100.00%	100.00%

=== 2000 census ===
At the 2000 census there were 304 people, 92 households, and 81 families in the CDP. The population density was 108.9 inhabitants per square mile (42.0/km^{2}). There were 129 housing units at an average density of 46.2 per square mile (17.8/km^{2}). The racial makeup of the CDP was 91.12% White, 0.33% African American, 7.24% from other races, and 1.32% from two or more races. Hispanic or Latino of any race were 99.34%.

Of the 92 households 32.6% had children under the age of 18 living with them, 64.1% were married couples living together, 23.9% had a female householder with no husband present, and 10.9% were non-families. 8.7% of households were one person and 6.5% were one person aged 65 or older. The average household size was 3.30 and the average family size was 3.55.

The age distribution was 29.6% under the age of 18, 11.2% from 18 to 24, 19.1% from 25 to 44, 26.3% from 45 to 64, and 13.8% 65 or older. The median age was 33 years. For every 100 females there were 75.7 males. For every 100 females age 18 and over, there were 82.9 males.

The median household income was $13,125 and the median family income was $13,490. Males had a median income of $31,250 versus $8,750 for females. The per capita income for the CDP was $5,115. About 40.0% of families and 38.2% of the population were below the poverty line, including 37.7% of those under the age of 18 and 30.2% of those 65 or over.

== Education ==
Public education in the community of Salineño is provided by the Roma Independent School District. The zoned elementary school for the 2010 Census community is Emma Vera Elementary School. Roma High School is the district's sole comprehensive high school.

Zoned campuses in 2009-2010 included Emma Vera Elementary School (grades K-5), Roma Middle School (grades 6–8), and Roma High School (grades 9–12).
