= Falconaire, Texas =

- CDP
- Interactive map of Falconaire, Texas
- Coordinates: 26°33′4″N 99°7′1″W
- Country: United States
- State: Texas
- County: Starr

Area
  - Total: 0.2 sq mi (0.52 km^{2})
  - Land: 0.2 sq mi (0.52 km^{2})
  - Water: 0.0 sq mi (0 km^{2})

Population (2020)
  - Total: 92
  - Density: 460/sq mi (180/km^{2})
- Time zone: UTC-6 (Central (CST))
  - Summer (DST): UTC-5 (CDT)
- Zip Code: 78545

Falconaire is a census-designated place (CDP) in Starr County, Texas, United States. It is a new CDP, formed from part of the Falcon Heights CDP prior to the 2010 census. As of the 2020 census, Falconaire had a population of 92.

== Geography ==
Falconaire is located at 26°33′4″N 99°7′1″W (26.551121, -99.116881).

== Demographics ==
Historical population
Census	Pop.	Note	%±
2010	132		—
2020	92		−30.3%
U.S. Decennial Census; 1850–1900 1910; 1920 1930 1940; 1950 1960 1970; 1980 1990 2000; 2010

Falconaire was first listed as a census designated place in the 2010 U.S. census, one of four new CDPs (Falconaire, H. Cuellar Estates, Indio, Lago Vista) carved out from the Falcon Heights CDP.

=== 2020 census ===
Falconaire CDP, Texas – Racial and ethnic composition Note: the US Census treats Hispanic/Latino as an ethnic category. This table excludes Latinos from the racial categories and assigns them to a separate category. Hispanics/Latinos may be of any race.
Race / Ethnicity (NH = Non-Hispanic)	Pop 2010	Pop 2020	% 2010	% 2020
White alone (NH)	0	0	0.00%	0.00%
Black or African American alone (NH)	0	0	0.00%	0.00%
Native American or Alaska Native alone (NH)	0	0	0.00%	0.00%
Asian alone (NH)	0	0	0.00%	0.00%
Native Hawaiian or Pacific Islander alone (NH)	0	0	0.00%	0.00%
Other race alone (NH)	0	0	0.00%	0.00%
Mixed race or Multiracial (NH)	0	1	0.00%	1.09%
Hispanic or Latino (any race)	132	91	100.00%	98.91%
Total	132	92	100.00%	100.00%

== Education ==
The CDP is within the Roma Independent School District. The zoned elementary school for the 2010 Census community is Emma Vera Elementary School. Roma High School is the district's sole comprehensive high school.
