= Los Arrieros, Texas =

- Unincorporated community
- Location within Texas Location within the United States
- Coordinates: 26°30′57″N 99°05′04″W
- Country: United States
- State: Texas
- County: Starr

Area
  - Total: 0.034 sq mi (0.088 km^{2})
  - Land: 0.034 sq mi (0.088 km^{2})
  - Water: 0 sq mi (0 km^{2})
- Elevation: 302 ft (92 m)

Population (2020)
  - Total: 43
  - Density: 1,300/sq mi (490/km^{2})
- Time zone: UTC-6 (Central (CST))
  - Summer (DST): UTC-5 (CDT)
- Area code: 956
- GNIS feature ID: 2584680

Los Arrieros is an unincorporated community and census-designated place in Starr County, Texas, United States. As of the 2020 census, Los Arrieros had a population of 43. U.S. Route 83 passes through the community.

== Geography ==
According to the U.S. Census Bureau, the community has an area of 0.034 square miles (0.088 km^{2}), all land.

== Demographics ==
Historical population
Census	Pop.	Note	%±
2010	91		—
2020	43		−52.7%
U.S. Decennial Census; 1850–1900 1910; 1920 1930 1940; 1950 1960 1970; 1980 1990 2000; 2010 2020

Los Arrieros first appeared as a census designated place in the 2010 U.S. census.

=== 2020 census ===
Los Arrieros CDP, Texas – Racial and ethnic composition Note: the US Census treats Hispanic/Latino as an ethnic category. This table excludes Latinos from the racial categories and assigns them to a separate category. Hispanics/Latinos may be of any race.
Race / Ethnicity (NH = Non-Hispanic)	Pop 2010	Pop 2020	% 2010	% 2020
White alone (NH)	12	1	13.19%	2.33%
Black or African American alone (NH)	0	0	0.00%	0.00%
Native American or Alaska Native alone (NH)	0	1	0.00%	2.33%
Asian alone (NH)	0	0	0.00%	0.00%
Native Hawaiian or Pacific Islander alone (NH)	0	0	0.00%	0.00%
Other race alone (NH)	0	0	0.00%	0.00%
Mixed race or Multiracial (NH)	0	0	0.00%	0.00%
Hispanic or Latino (any race)	79	41	86.81%	95.35%
Total	91	43	100.00%	100.00%

== Education ==
The CDP is within the Roma Independent School District. The zoned elementary school for the 2010 Census community is Emma Vera Elementary School. Roma High School is the district's sole comprehensive high school.
