= Garceno, Texas =

Census-designated place in Starr County, Texas, United States

- Census-designated place
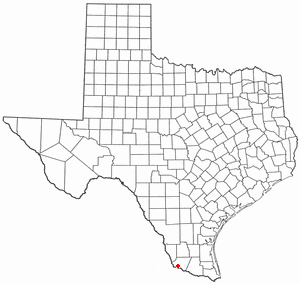
- Location of Garceno, Texas

- Coordinates: 26°24′44″N 98°56′25.5″W
- Country: United States
- State: Texas
- County: Starr

Area
  - Total: 0.2 sq mi (0.52 km^{2})
  - Land: 0.2 sq mi (0.52 km^{2})
  - Water: 0.0 sq mi (0 km^{2})
- Elevation: 194 ft (59 m)

Population (2020)
  - Total: 440
  - Density: 2,200/sq mi (850/km^{2})
- Time zone: UTC-6 (Central (CST))
  - Summer (DST): UTC-5 (CDT)
- ZIP code: 78584
- Area code: 956
- FIPS code: 48-28128
- GNIS feature ID: 1336371

Garceno is a census-designated place (CDP) in Starr County, Texas, United States. The population was 440 at the 2020 census, an increase from the figure of 420 tabulated in 2010.

== Geography ==
Garceno is located at 26°24′44″N 98°56′25.5″W (26.412177, -98.940428).

Prior to the 2010 census, Garceno CDP had part incorporated into Escobares city, part taken to form San Juan CDP, and lost additional area. As a result, the total area was reduced to 0.2 square miles (0.5 km^{2}), all land.

== Demographics ==
Historical population
Census	Pop.	Note	%±
2000	1,438		—
2010	420		−70.8%
2020	440		4.8%
U.S. Decennial Census; 1850–1900 1910; 1920 1930 1940; 1950 1960 1970; 1980 1990 2000; 2010 2020

Garceno first appeared as a census designated place in the 2000 U.S. census.

=== 2020 census ===
Garceno CDP, Texas – Racial and ethnic composition Note: the US Census treats Hispanic/Latino as an ethnic category. This table excludes Latinos from the racial categories and assigns them to a separate category. Hispanics/Latinos may be of any race.
Race / Ethnicity (NH = Non-Hispanic)	Pop 2000	Pop 2010	Pop 2020	% 2000	% 2010	% 2020
White alone (NH)	30	59	8	2.09%	14.05%	1.82%
Black or African American alone (NH)	0	0	0	0.00%	0.00%	0.00%
Native American or Alaska Native alone (NH)	3	0	0	0.21%	0.00%	0.00%
Asian alone (NH)	0	0	0	0.00%	0.00%	0.00%
Pacific Islander alone (NH)	0	0	0	0.00%	0.00%	0.00%
Some Other Race alone (NH)	0	0	0	0.00%	0.00%	0.00%
Mixed race or Multiracial (NH)	0	0	0	0.00%	0.00%	0.00%
Hispanic or Latino (any race)	1,405	361	432	97.71%	85.95%	98.18%
Total	1,438	420	440	100.00%	100.00%	100.00%

=== 2000 census ===
At the 2000 census there were 1,438 people, 354 households, and 312 families in the CDP. The population density was 440.6 inhabitants per square mile (170.1/km^{2}). There were 420 housing units at an average density of 128.7 per square mile (49.7/km^{2}). The racial makeup of the CDP was 82.41% White, 0.21% African American, 1.46% Native American, 14.81% from other races, and 1.11% from two or more races. Hispanic or Latino of any race were 97.71%.

Of the 354 households 57.9% had children under the age of 18 living with them, 63.6% were married couples living together, 18.6% had a female householder with no husband present, and 11.6% were non-families. 10.5% of households were one person and 4.8% were one person aged 65 or older. The average household size was 4.06 and the average family size was 4.35.

The age distribution was 39.2% under the age of 18, 12.6% from 18 to 24, 25.9% from 25 to 44, 16.1% from 45 to 64, and 6.2% 65 or older. The median age was 24 years. For every 100 females, there were 99.4 males. For every 100 females age 18 and over, there were 92.1 males.

The median household income was $9,750 and the median family income was $10,833. Males had a median income of $12,670 versus $7,132 for females. The per capita income for the CDP was $5,922. About 68.8% of families and 71.1% of the population were below the poverty line, including 76.1% of those under age 18 and 77.3% of those age 65 or over.

== Education ==
Public education in the community of Garceno is provided by the Roma Independent School District. The zoned elementary school is R. T. Barrera Elementary School. Roma High School is the district's sole comprehensive high school.

Zoned campuses for the 2009–2010 school year included Anna S. Canavan Elementary School (pre-kindergarten), R.T. Barrera Elementary School (grades K-5), Ramiro Barrera Middle School (grades 6–8), and Roma High School (grades 9–12).

== See also ==
- List of census-designated places in Texas
