= Los Barreras, Texas =

- CDP
- Interactive map of Los Barreras, Texas
- Coordinates: 26°23′28″N 98°55′6″W
- Country: United States
- State: Texas
- County: Starr

Area
  - Total: 0.2 sq mi (0.52 km^{2})
  - Land: 0.2 sq mi (0.52 km^{2})
  - Water: 0.0 sq mi (0 km^{2})

Population (2020)
  - Total: 278
  - Density: 1,400/sq mi (540/km^{2})
- Time zone: UTC-6 (Central (CST))
  - Summer (DST): UTC-5 (CDT)
- Zip Code: 78582

Los Barreras is a census-designated place (CDP) in Starr County, Texas, United States. It is a new CDP, formed from part of the La Rosita CDP prior to the 2010 census. As of the 2020 census, Los Barreras had a population of 278.

== Geography ==
Los Barreras is located at 26°23′28″N 98°55′6″W (26.391164, -98.918353).

== Demographics ==
Historical population
| Census | Pop. | Note | %± |
|---|---|---|---|
| 2010 | 288 | | — |
| 2020 | 278 | | −3.5% |
U.S. Decennial Census; 1850–1900 1910; 1920 1930 1940; 1950 1960 1970; 1980 1990 2000; 2010 2020

Los Barreras was first listed as a census designated place in the 2010 U.S. census, one of ten new CDPs (Anacua, Campo Verde, El Cenizo, Hilltop, La Chuparosa, Los Barreras, Los Ebanos, Miguel Barrera, Rancho Viejo, and Tierra Dorada) carved out of the La Rosita CDP.

=== 2020 census ===
Los Barreras, Texas – Racial and ethnic composition Note: the US Census treats Hispanic/Latino as an ethnic category. This table excludes Latinos from the racial categories and assigns them to a separate category. Hispanics/Latinos may be of any race.
| Race / Ethnicity (NH = Non-Hispanic) | Pop 2010 | Pop 2020 | % 2010 | % 2020 |
|---|---|---|---|---|
| White alone (NH) | 5 | 5 | 1.74% | 1.80% |
| Black or African American alone (NH) | 0 | 1 | 0.00% | 0.36% |
| Native American or Alaska Native alone (NH) | 0 | 0 | 0.00% | 0.00% |
| Asian alone (NH) | 0 | 0 | 0.00% | 0.00% |
| Pacific Islander alone (NH) | 0 | 0 | 0.00% | 0.00% |
| Some Other Race alone (NH) | 0 | 0 | 0.00% | 0.00% |
| Mixed Race or Multi-Racial (NH) | 0 | 0 | 0.00% | 0.00% |
| Hispanic or Latino (any race) | 283 | 272 | 98.26% | 97.84% |
| Total | 288 | 278 | 100.00% | 100.00% |

== Education ==
The CDP is within the Roma Independent School District. The zoned elementary school is Delia Gonzalez (DG) Garcia Elementary School. Roma High School is the district's sole comprehensive high school.
