= Sandoval, Texas =

- CDP
- Interactive map of Sandoval, Texas
- Coordinates: 26°25′6″N 99°4′46″W
- Country: United States
- State: Texas
- County: Starr

Population (2020)
  - Total: 37
- Time zone: UTC-6 (Central (CST))
  - Summer (DST): UTC-5 (CDT)
- Zip Code: 78584

Sandoval is a census-designated place (CDP) in Starr County, Texas, United States. It is a new CDP formed from part of the Fronton CDP prior to the 2010 census. As of the 2020 census, Sandoval had a population of 37.

== Geography ==
Sandoval is located at 26°25′6″N 99°4′46″W (26.418189, -99.079431).

== Demographics ==
Historical population
| Census | Pop. | Note | %± |
|---|---|---|---|
| 2010 | 32 | | — |
| 2020 | 37 | | 15.6% |
U.S. Decennial Census; 1850–1900 1910; 1920 1930 1940; 1950 1960 1970; 1980 1990 2000; 2010

Sandoval first appeared as a census designated place in the 2010 U.S. census, one of three CDPs (Guadalupe-Guerra, Sandoval, Sunset) carved out of the Fronton CDP.

=== 2020 census ===
Sandoval CDP, Texas – Racial and ethnic composition Note: the US Census treats Hispanic/Latino as an ethnic category. This table excludes Latinos from the racial categories and assigns them to a separate category. Hispanics/Latinos may be of any race.
| Race / Ethnicity (NH = Non-Hispanic) | Pop 2010 | Pop 2020 | % 2010 | % 2020 |
|---|---|---|---|---|
| White alone (NH) | 0 | 1 | 0.00% | 2.70% |
| Black or African American alone (NH) | 0 | 0 | 0.00% | 0.00% |
| Native American or Alaska Native alone (NH) | 0 | 0 | 0.00% | 0.00% |
| Asian alone (NH) | 0 | 0 | 0.00% | 0.00% |
| Native Hawaiian or Pacific Islander alone (NH) | 0 | 0 | 0.00% | 0.00% |
| Other race alone (NH) | 0 | 0 | 0.00% | 0.00% |
| Mixed race or Multiracial (NH) | 0 | 1 | 0.00% | 2.70% |
| Hispanic or Latino (any race) | 32 | 35 | 100.00% | 94.59% |
| Total | 32 | 37 | 100.00% | 100.00% |

== Education ==
The CDP is within the Roma Independent School District. The zoned elementary school for the 2010 Census community is Emma Vera Elementary School. Roma High School is the district's sole comprehensive high school.
