= José Bernardo Gutiérrez de Lara School of Medicine =

Mexican medical school

José Bernardo Gutiérrez de Lara School of Medicine (JBGdL) is a medical school located in Nueva Ciudad Guerrero, Tamaulipas, Mexico. The school is 1.5 hours northwest of McAllen, Texas. JBGdL began instruction in 2007. It is authorized by the Secretaría de Educación Pública in Ciudad Victoria, Tamaulipas, Mexico to give instruction in English.

JBGdL is listed in FAIMER's IMED, and is accredited by the Secretariat of Health in Mexico.

JBGdL has a four-year medical program, with clinical rotations in either the United States or Mexico for the last two years of the academic program.

The school is named after Bernardo Gutiérrez de Lara, the first constitutional governor of the state of Tamaulipas, and a native of Revilla, today known as Ciudad Vicente Guerrero, Mexico.
