= Los Alvarez, Texas =

- CDP
- Coordinates: 26°23′09″N 98°53′56″W
- Country: United States
- State: Texas
- County: Starr

Area
  - Total: 0.1 sq mi (0.26 km^{2})
  - Land: 0.1 sq mi (0.26 km^{2})
  - Water: 0.0 sq mi (0 km^{2})
- Elevation: 200 ft (60 m)

Population (2020)
  - Total: 247
  - Density: 2,500/sq mi (950/km^{2})
- Time zone: UTC-6 (Central (CST))
  - Summer (DST): UTC-5 (CDT)
- Zip Code: 78582
- FIPS code: 48-44044
- GNIS feature ID: 1852732

Los Alvarez is a census-designated place (CDP) in Starr County, Texas, United States. As of the 2020 census, Los Alvarez had a population of 247.

== Geography ==
Los Alvarez is located at 26°23′09″N 98°53′56″W (26.385936, -98.899036).

Before the 2010 census, parts of the CDP were taken to form new CDPs and additional area was also lost, reducing the total area of 0.1 square mile (0.3 km^{2}), all land.

== Demographics ==
Historical population
Census	Pop.	Note	%±
2000	1,434		—
2010	303		−78.9%
2020	247		−18.5%
U.S. Decennial Census; 1850–1900 1910; 1920 1930 1940; 1950 1960 1970; 1980 1990 2000; 2010 2020

Los Alvarez first appeared as a census designated place in the 2000 U.S. census. Prior to the 2010 U.S. census 4 CDPs (Barrera, El Quiote, Flor del Rio, and Palo Blanco) were carved out from its territory.

=== 2020 census ===
Los Alvarez CDP, Texas – Racial and ethnic composition Note: the US Census treats Hispanic/Latino as an ethnic category. This table excludes Latinos from the racial categories and assigns them to a separate category. Hispanics/Latinos may be of any race.
Race / Ethnicity (NH = Non-Hispanic)	Pop 2000	Pop 2010	Pop 2020	% 2000	% 2010	% 2020
White alone (NH)	7	0	2	0.49%	0.00%	0.81%
Black or African American alone (NH)	0	0	0	0.00%	0.00%	0.00%
Native American or Alaska Native alone (NH)	0	0	1	0.00%	0.00%	0.40%
Asian alone (NH)	0	0	1	0.00%	0.00%	0.40%
Pacific Islander alone (NH)	0	0	0	0.00%	0.00%	0.00%
Some Other Race alone (NH)	0	0	2	0.00%	0.00%	0.81%
Mixed race or Multiracial (NH)	1	0	1	0.07%	0.00%	0.40%
Hispanic or Latino (any race)	1,426	303	240	99.44%	100.00%	97.17%
Total	1,434	303	247	100.00%	100.00%	100.00%

=== 2000 census ===
At the 2000 census, there were 1,434 people, 379 households and 344 families residing in the CDP. The population density was 425.0 inhabitants per square mile (164.1/km^{2}). There were 453 housing units at an average density of 134.3 per square mile (51.9/km^{2}). The racial makeup of the CDP was 66.60% White, 0.07% African American, 32.57% from other races, and 0.77% from two or more races. Hispanic or Latino of any race were 99.44% of the population.

There were 379 households, of which 61.7% had children under the age of 18 living with them, 66.2% were married couples living together, 19.8% had a female householder with no husband present, and 9.0% were non-families. 8.7% of all households were made up of individuals, and 4.2% had someone living alone who was 65 years of age or older. The average household size was 3.78 and the average family size was 4.01.

38.6% of the population were under the age of 18, 11.9% from 18 to 24, 27.5% from 25 to 44, 15.3% from 45 to 64, and 6.7% who were 65 years of age or older. The median age was 24 years. For every 100 females, there were 87.2 males. For every 100 females age 18 and over, there were 84.9 males.

The median household income was $20,427 and the median family income was $21,738. Males had a median income of $20,313 and females $12,679. The per capita income was $8,969. About 34.4% of families and 38.0% of the population were below the poverty line, including 47.4% of those under age 18 and 67.4% of those age 65 or over.

== Education ==
Half of the current Los Alvarez CDP is in the Roma Independent School District, while the other half is in the Rio Grande City Grulla Independent School District (formerly the Rio Grande City Consolidated Independent School District). The zoned elementary school for the Roma part is Delia Gonzalez (DG) Garcia Elementary School. Roma High School is the Roma district's sole comprehensive high school.

Most of the former Los Alvarez CDP was part of Roma ISD. Zoned campuses include: Anna S. Canavan Elementary School (pre-kindergarten), R.T. Barrera Elementary School (grades K-5), Ramiro Barrera Middle School (grades 6–8) and Roma High School (grades 9–12). The eastern portion of the former CDP was served by the Rio Grande City Consolidated Independent School District.
