= Tierra Dorada, Texas =

- CDP
- Interactive map of Tierra Dorada, Texas
- Coordinates: 26°24′2″N 98°55′17″W
- Country: United States
- State: Texas
- County: Starr

Population (2010)
  - Total: 28
- Time zone: UTC-6 (Central (CST))
  - Summer (DST): UTC-5 (CDT)
- Zip Code: 78582

Tierra Dorada is a census-designated place (CDP) in Starr County, Texas, United States. It is a new CDP formed from part of the La Rosita CDP prior to the 2010 census. As of the 2020 census, Tierra Dorada had a population of 29.

== Geography ==
Tierra Dorada is located at 26°24′2″N 98°55′17″W (26.400653, -98.921262).

== Demographics ==
Historical population
Census	Pop.	Note	%±
2010	28		—
2020	29		3.6%
U.S. Decennial Census; 1850–1900 1910; 1920 1930 1940; 1950 1960 1970; 1980 1990 2000; 2010

Tierra Dorada was first listed as a census designated place in the 2010 U.S. census, one of ten new CDPs (Anacua, Campo Verde, El Cenizo, Hilltop, La Chuparosa, Los Barreras, Los Ebanos, Miguel Barrera, Rancho Viejo, and Tierra Dorada) carved out of the La Rosita CDP.

=== 2020 census ===
Tierra Dorada CDP (Starr County), Texas – Racial and ethnic composition Note: the US Census treats Hispanic/Latino as an ethnic category. This table excludes Latinos from the racial categories and assigns them to a separate category. Hispanics/Latinos may be of any race.
Race / Ethnicity (NH = Non-Hispanic)	Pop 2010	Pop 2020	% 2010	% 2020
White alone (NH)	0	1	0.00%	3.45%
Black or African American alone (NH)	0	0	0.00%	0.00%
Native American or Alaska Native alone (NH)	0	0	0.00%	0.00%
Asian alone (NH)	0	0	0.00%	0.00%
Native Hawaiian or Pacific Islander alone (NH)	0	0	0.00%	0.00%
Other race alone (NH)	0	0	0.00%	0.00%
Mixed race or Multiracial (NH)	0	1	0.00%	3.45%
Hispanic or Latino (any race)	28	27	100.00%	93.10%
Total	28	29	100.00%	100.00%

== Education ==
The CDP is within the Roma Independent School District. The zoned elementary school for the 2010 Census community is Delia Gonzalez (DG) Garcia Elementary School. Roma High School is the district's sole comprehensive high school.
