= North Escobares, Texas =

- CDP
- Coordinates: 26°25′57″N 98°58′19″W
- Country: United States
- State: Texas
- County: Starr

Area
  - Total: 0.69 sq mi (1.8 km^{2})
  - Land: 0.69 sq mi (1.8 km^{2})
  - Water: 0 sq mi (0.0 km^{2})
- Elevation: 184 ft (56 m)

Population (2020)
  - Total: 162
  - Density: 230/sq mi (90/km^{2})
- Time zone: UTC-6 (Central (CST))
  - Summer (DST): UTC-5 (CDT)
- Zip Code: 78584
- FIPS code: 48-52068
- GNIS feature ID: 1852745

North Escobares is a census-designated place (CDP) in Starr County, Texas, United States. The population was 162 at the 2020 census.

== Geography ==
North Escobares is located at 26°25′57″N 98°58′19″W (26.432492, -98.971935).

Prior to the 2010 census, part of North Escobares CDP was incorporated into Escobares city and parts were taken to form new CDPs (Escobar I, JF Villarreal CDP, Loma Vista CDP, Moraida CDP, Pena CDP, and Rivera CDP) and additional area was lost. As a result, the CDP's total area was reduced to 0.7 square mile (1.8 km^{2}), all land.

== Demographics ==
Historical population
Census	Pop.	Note	%±
2000	1,692		—
2010	118		−93.0%
2020	162		37.3%
U.S. Decennial Census; 1850–1900 1910; 1920 1930 1940; 1950 1960 1970; 1980 1990 2000; 2010 2020

North Escobares first appeared as a census designated place in the 2000 U.S. census. Prior to the 2010 census, part of North Escobares CDP was incorporated into Escobares city and parts were taken to form new CDPs (Escobar I, JF Villarreal CDP, Loma Vista CDP, Moraida CDP, Pena CDP, and Rivera CDP) and additional area was lost.

=== 2020 census ===
North Escobares CDP, Texas – Racial and ethnic composition Note: the US Census treats Hispanic/Latino as an ethnic category. This table excludes Latinos from the racial categories and assigns them to a separate category. Hispanics/Latinos may be of any race.
Race / Ethnicity (NH = Non-Hispanic)	Pop 2000	Pop 2010	Pop 2020	% 2000	% 2010	% 2020
White alone (NH)	94	0	3	5.56%	0.00%	1.85%
Black or African American alone (NH)	0	0	0	0.00%	0.00%	0.00%
Native American or Alaska Native alone (NH)	0	0	0	0.00%	0.00%	0.00%
Asian alone (NH)	0	0	0	0.00%	0.00%	0.00%
Pacific Islander alone (NH)	0	0	0	0.00%	0.00%	0.00%
Some Other Race alone (NH)	0	0	0	0.00%	0.00%	0.00%
Mixed race or Multiracial (NH)	0	0	0	0.00%	0.00%	0.00%
Hispanic or Latino (any race)	1,598	118	159	97.44%	100.00%	98.15%
Total	1,692	118	162	100.00%	100.00%	100.00%

At the 2000 census there were 1,692 people, 412 households, and 390 families in the CDP. The population density was 638.3 inhabitants per square mile (246.4/km^{2}). There were 505 housing units at an average density of 190.5 per square mile (73.6/km^{2}). The racial makeup of the CDP was 99.47% White, 0.06% African American, 0.12% from other races, and 0.35% from two or more races. Hispanic or Latino of any race were 94.44%.

Of the 412 households 72.8% had children under the age of 18 living with them, 68.4% were married couples living together, 23.5% had a female householder with no husband present, and 5.3% were non-families. 4.9% of households were one person and 1.5% were one person aged 65 or older. The average household size was 4.11 and the average family size was 4.26.

The age distribution was 46.6% under the age of 18, 9.9% from 18 to 24, 28.8% from 25 to 44, 10.7% from 45 to 64, and 4.0% 65 or older. The median age was 20 years. For every 100 females, there were 88.6 males. For every 100 females age 18 and over, there were 82.4 males.

The median household income was $15,958 and the median family income was $16,750. Males had a median income of $16,071 versus $6,250 for females. The per capita income for the CDP was $4,562. About 59.7% of families and 61.4% of the population were below the poverty line, including 67.1% of those under age 18 and 15.8% of those age 65 or over.

== Education ==
Public education in the community of North Escobares is provided by the Roma Independent School District. The zoned elementary school is Veterans Memorial Elementary School. Roma High School is the district's sole comprehensive high school.

Zoned campuses in the 2009–2010 school year included Anna S. Canavan Elementary School (pre-kindergarten), either Ynes B. Elementary School or Emma Vera Elementary School (grades K-5), Ramiro Barrera Middle School (grades 6–8), and Roma High School (grades 9–12).
