= Flor del Rio, Texas =

- CDP
- Interactive map of Flor del Rio, Texas
- Coordinates: 26°24′5″N 98°54′5″W
- Country: United States
- State: Texas
- County: Starr

Population (2020)
  - Total: 101
- Time zone: UTC-6 (Central (CST))
  - Summer (DST): UTC-5 (CDT)
- Zip Code: 78582

Flor del Rio is a census-designated place (CDP) in Starr County, Texas, United States. It is a new CDP, formed from part of the Los Alvarez CDP prior to the 2010 census. As of the 2020 census, Flor del Rio had a population of 101.

== Geography ==
Flor del Rio is located at 26°24′5″N 98°54′5″W (26.401302, -98.901498).

== Demographics ==
Historical population
Census	Pop.	Note	%±
2010	122		—
2020	101		−17.2%
U.S. Decennial Census; 1850–1900 1910; 1920 1930 1940; 1950 1960 1970; 1980 1990 2000; 2010

Flor del Rio first appeared as a census designated place in the 2010 U.S. census after being carved out along with 3 other CDPs (Barrera, El Quiote, and Palo Blanco) from the Los Alvarez CDP.

=== 2020 census ===
Flor del Rio CDP, Texas – Racial and ethnic composition Note: the US Census treats Hispanic/Latino as an ethnic category. This table excludes Latinos from the racial categories and assigns them to a separate category. Hispanics/Latinos may be of any race.
Race / Ethnicity (NH = Non-Hispanic)	Pop 2010	Pop 2020	% 2010	% 2020
White alone (NH)	0	1	0.00%	0.99%
Black or African American alone (NH)	0	0	0.00%	0.00%
Native American or Alaska Native alone (NH)	0	0	0.00%	0.00%
Asian alone (NH)	0	0	0.00%	0.00%
Native Hawaiian or Pacific Islander alone (NH)	0	0	0.00%	0.00%
Other race alone (NH)	0	2	0.00%	1.98%
Mixed race or Multiracial (NH)	0	0	0.00%	0.00%
Hispanic or Latino (any race)	122	98	100.00%	97.03%
Total	122	101	100.00%	100.00%

== Education ==
The CDP is within the Roma Independent School District. The zoned elementary school is Delia Gonzalez (DG) Garcia Elementary School. Roma High School is the district's sole comprehensive high school.
