= Falcon Village, Texas =

- CDP
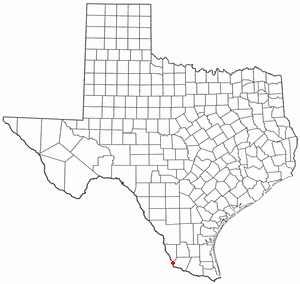
- Location of Falcon Village, Texas

- Coordinates: 26°33′43″N 99°8′2″W
- Country: United States
- State: Texas
- County: Starr

Area
  - Total: 0.85 sq mi (2.2 km^{2})
  - Land: 0.85 sq mi (2.2 km^{2})
  - Water: 0 sq mi (0.0 km^{2})
- Elevation: 338 ft (103 m)

Population (2020)
  - Total: 3
  - Density: 3.5/sq mi (1.4/km^{2})
- Time zone: UTC-6 (Central (CST))
  - Summer (DST): UTC-5 (CDT)
- ZIP code: 78545
- Area code: 956
- FIPS code: 48-25356
- GNIS feature ID: 1335668

Falcon Village is a census-designated place (CDP) in Starr County, Texas, United States. The population was 3 at the 2020 census.

== Geography ==
Falcon Village is located at 26°33′43″N 99°8′2″W (26.561861, -99.133924).

According to the United States Census Bureau, the CDP has a total area of 0.9 square mile (2.2 km^{2}), all land.

== Demographics ==
Historical population
Census	Pop.	Note	%±
2000	78		—
2010	47		−39.7%
2020	3		−93.6%
U.S. Decennial Census; 1850–1900 1910; 1920 1930 1940; 1950 1960 1970; 1980 1990 2000; 2010

Falcon Village was first listed as a census designated place in the 2000 U.S. census.

=== 2020 census ===
Falcon Village CDP, Texas – Racial and ethnic composition Note: the US Census treats Hispanic/Latino as an ethnic category. This table excludes Latinos from the racial categories and assigns them to a separate category. Hispanics/Latinos may be of any race.
Race / Ethnicity (NH = Non-Hispanic)	Pop 2000	Pop 2010	Pop 2020	% 2000	% 2010	% 2020
White alone (NH)	39	10	0	50.00%	21.28%	0.00%
Black or African American alone (NH)	0	0	0	0.00%	0.00%	0.00%
Native American or Alaska Native alone (NH)	0	0	0	0.00%	0.00%	0.00%
Asian alone (NH)	1	0	0	1.28%	0.00%	0.00%
Native Hawaiian or Pacific Islander alone (NH)	0	0	0	0.00%	0.00%	0.00%
Other race alone (NH)	0	0	0	0.00%	0.00%	0.00%
Mixed race or Multiracial (NH)	0	0	0	0.00%	0.00%	0.00%
Hispanic or Latino (any race)	38	37	3	48.72%	78.72%	100.00%
Total	78	47	3	100.00%	100.00%	100.00%

As of the 2010 census, Falcon Village had a population of 47. All the residents reported their race as being white and 78.7% of the population identified as being Hispanic or Latino.

At the 2000 census there were 78 people, 32 households, and 22 families in the CDP. The population density was 90.2 inhabitants per square mile (34.8/km^{2}). There were 54 housing units at an average density of 62.4 per square mile (24.1/km^{2}). The racial makeup of the CDP was 91.03% White, 1.28% Asian, 7.69% from other races. Hispanic or Latino of any race were 48.72%.

Of the 32 households, 34.4% had children under the age of 18 living with them, 65.6% were married couples living together, 3.1% had a female householder with no husband present, and 31.3% were non-families. 31.3% of households were one person and none had someone living alone who was 65 or older. The average household size was 2.44 and the average family size was 3.09.

The age distribution was 32.1% under the age of 18, 1.3% from 18 to 24, 35.9% from 25 to 44, 24.4% from 45 to 64, and 6.4% 65 or older. The median age was 31 years. For every 100 females, there were 90.2 males. For every 100 females age 18 and over, there were 112.0 males.

The median household income was $39,028 and the median family income was $37,917. Males had a median income of $34,028 versus $0 for females. The per capita income for the CDP was $14,097. None of the population or families were below the poverty line.

== Education ==
Public education in the community of Falcon Village is provided by the Roma Independent School District. The zoned elementary school for the 2010 Census community is Emma Vera Elementary School. Roma High School is the district's sole comprehensive high school.

Zoned campuses in 2009-2010 included Anna S. Canavan Elementary School (pre-kindergarten), Emma Vera Elementary School (grades K-5), Roma Middle School (grades 6–8), and Roma High School (grades 9–12).
