= Ramos, Texas =

- CDP
- Interactive map of Ramos, Texas
- Coordinates: 26°25′41″N 99°1′34″W
- Country: United States
- State: Texas
- County: Starr

Area
  - Total: 0.1 sq mi (0.26 km^{2})
  - Land: 0.1 sq mi (0.26 km^{2})
  - Water: 0.0 sq mi (0 km^{2})

Population (2020)
  - Total: 144
  - Density: 1,400/sq mi (560/km^{2})
- Time zone: UTC-6 (Central (CST))
  - Summer (DST): UTC-5 (CDT)
- Zip Code: 78584

Ramos is a census-designated place (CDP) in Starr County, Texas, United States. It is a new CDP, formed from part of the Roma Creek CDP prior to the 2010 census. As of the 2020 census, Ramos had a population of 144.

== Geography ==
Ramos is located at 26°25′41″N 99°1′34″W (26.427984, -99.026031).

== Demographics ==
Historical population
Census	Pop.	Note	%±
2010	116		—
2020	144		24.1%
U.S. Decennial Census; 1850–1900 1910; 1920 1930 1940; 1950 1960 1970; 1980 1990 2000; 2010 2020

Ramos first appeared as a census designated place in the 2010 U.S. census, one of three CDPs (Evergreen, Fronton Ranchettes and Ramos) carved out of the Roma Creek CDP.

=== 2020 census ===
Ramos CDP, Texas – Racial and ethnic composition Note: the US Census treats Hispanic/Latino as an ethnic category. This table excludes Latinos from the racial categories and assigns them to a separate category. Hispanics/Latinos may be of any race.
Race / Ethnicity (NH = Non-Hispanic)	Pop 2010	Pop 2020	% 2010	% 2020
White alone (NH)	0	0	0.00%	0.00%
Black or African American alone (NH)	0	0	0.00%	0.00%
Native American or Alaska Native alone (NH)	0	0	0.00%	0.00%
Asian alone (NH)	0	0	0.00%	0.00%
Pacific Islander alone (NH)	0	0	0.00%	0.00%
Some Other Race alone (NH)	0	0	0.00%	0.00%
Mixed Race or Multi-Racial (NH)	0	1	0.00%	0.69%
Hispanic or Latino (any race)	116	143	100.00%	99.31%
Total	116	144	100.00%	100.00%

== Education ==
The CDP is within the Roma Independent School District. The zoned elementary school for the 2010 Census community is Emma Vera Elementary School. Roma High School is the district's sole comprehensive high school.
