= Nueva Ciudad Guerrero =

- Municipality
- Location within Tamaulipas Location within Mexico
- Coordinates: 26°33′49″N 99°13′36″W
- Country: Mexico
- State: Tamaulipas
- Municipality: Guerrero
- Elevation: 40 m (130 ft)

Population (2020)
  - Total: 3,451
- Time zone: UTC–06:00 (Zona Centro)
  - Summer (DST): UTC–05:00 (DST)
- Codigo Postal: 88370

Nueva Ciudad Guerrero (New Guerrero City) is a city in the Mexican state of Tamaulipas. It lies on the banks of the Rio Grande / Río Bravo, near the US–Mexico border, opposite to Falcon Heights, Texas. The Lake Falcon Dam International Crossing connects Falcon Heights with Nueva Ciudad Guerrero.

It is located in Guerrero Municipality, Tamaulipas. The city's population at the 2010 census was 4,312 inhabitants, comprising 96.3% of its municipality population of 4,477 inhabitants.

== History ==
Ciudad Guerrero was founded in 1750, as Villa del Señor San Ignacio de Loyola de Revilla but later was named after the second President of Mexico Vicente Guerrero. The city served for a short time as the capital of the Republic of the Rio Grande in 1840.

The city name of City of New Guerrero follows the Old Guerrero City (Antigua Guerrero) that was located on a tributary of the Rio Grande, the Rio Salado, some ten kilometers from the original banks of the Rio Grande. Old Guerrero was flooded after the construction of Falcon Dam, and moved south to its current location on the current shoreline of Falcon Lake. The original Church 26.7777°N 99.3391°W is partially above water and may still be viewable on the Salado Arm of the lake or approached on land when the water level in the lake is low. As of 2010, the area was reported to have become dangerous to visit because of the presence of rival drug cartels.

== See also ==
- José Bernardo Gutiérrez de Lara School of Medicine
