= Fronton, Texas =

- CDP
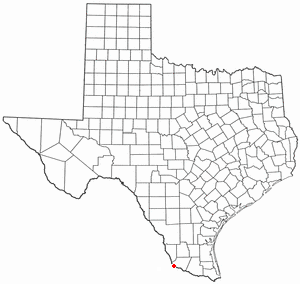
- Location of Fronton, Texas

- Coordinates: 26°25′33″N 99°4′34″W
- Country: United States
- State: Texas
- County: Starr

Area
  - Total: 0.4 sq mi (1.0 km^{2})
  - Land: 0.4 sq mi (1.0 km^{2})
  - Water: 0.0 sq mi (0 km^{2})
- Elevation: 200 ft (61 m)

Population (2020)
  - Total: 172
  - Density: 430/sq mi (170/km^{2})
- Time zone: UTC-6 (Central (CST))
  - Summer (DST): UTC-5 (CDT)
- ZIP code: 78584
- Area code: 956
- FIPS code: 48-27744
- GNIS feature ID: 1336274

Fronton is a census-designated place (CDP) in Starr County, Texas, United States, bordering the Mexican state of Tamaulipas, close to Ciudad Miguel Alemán. The population was 172 at the 2020 census, a decline from the figure of 180 tabulated in 2010.

== Geography ==
Fronton is located at 26°25′33″N 99°4′34″W (26.425856, -99.076206).

Prior to the 2010 census, Fronton CDP had parts taken to form new CDPs, and lost additional area. As a result, the total area was reduced to 0.2 square mile (0.5 km^{2}), all land.

== Demographics ==
Historical population
| Census | Pop. | Note | %± |
|---|---|---|---|
| 2000 | 599 | | — |
| 2010 | 180 | | −69.9% |
| 2020 | 172 | | −4.4% |
U.S. Decennial Census; 1850–1900 1910; 1920 1930 1940; 1950 1960 1970; 1980 1990 2000; 2010 2020

Fronton was first listed as a census designated place in the 2000 U.S. census. Prior to the 2010 U.S. census, three new CDPs were carved out from its territory (Guadalupe-Guerra, Sandoval, Sunset) substantially reducing its population.

=== 2020 census ===
Fronton CDP, Texas – Racial and ethnic composition Note: the US Census treats Hispanic/Latino as an ethnic category. This table excludes Latinos from the racial categories and assigns them to a separate category. Hispanics/Latinos may be of any race.
| Race / Ethnicity (NH = Non-Hispanic) | Pop 2000 | Pop 2010 | Pop 2020 | % 2000 | % 2010 | % 2020 |
|---|---|---|---|---|---|---|
| White alone (NH) | 24 | 0 | 2 | 4.01% | 0.00% | 1.16% |
| Black or African American alone (NH) | 0 | 0 | 0 | 0.00% | 0.00% | 0.00% |
| Native American or Alaska Native alone (NH) | 0 | 0 | 0 | 0.00% | 0.00% | 0.00% |
| Asian alone (NH) | 0 | 0 | 0 | 0.00% | 0.00% | 0.00% |
| Pacific Islander alone (NH) | 0 | 0 | 0 | 0.00% | 0.00% | 0.00% |
| Some Other Race alone (NH) | 0 | 0 | 0 | 0.00% | 0.00% | 0.00% |
| Mixed race or Multiracial (NH) | 0 | 0 | 2 | 0.00% | 0.00% | 1.16% |
| Hispanic or Latino (any race) | 575 | 180 | 168 | 95.99% | 100.00% | 97.67% |
| Total | 599 | 180 | 172 | 100.00% | 100.00% | 100.00% |

=== 2000 census ===
At the 2000 census, there were 599 people, 176 households and 152 families residing in the CDP. The population density was 139 inhabitants per square mile (54/km^{2}). There were 218 housing units at an average density of 51/sq mi (20/km^{2}). The racial makeup of the CDP was 91% White, 7.0% from other races, and 1.8% from two or more races. Hispanic or Latino of any race were 96% of the population.

There were 176 households, of which 51% had children under the age of 18 living with them, 61% were married couples living together, 20% had a female householder with no husband present, and 13% were non-families. 13% of all households were made up of individuals, and 5% had someone living alone who was 65 years of age or older. The average household size was 3.4 and the average family size was 3.8.

35% of the population were under the age of 18, 12% from 18 to 24, 26% from 25 to 44, 19% from 45 to 64, and 8% who were 65 years of age or older. The median age was 27 years. For every 100 females, there were 92 males. For every 100 females age 18 and over, there were 87 males.

The median household income was $15,556 and the median family incomewas $15,556. Males had a median income of $22,396 and females $13,947. The per capita income for the CDP was $6,642. About 48% of families and 38% of the population were below the poverty line, including 24% of those under age 18 and 100% of those age 65 or over.

== Education ==
Public education in the community of Fronton is provided by the Roma Independent School District. The zoned elementary school for the 2010 Census community is Emma Vera Elementary School. Roma High School is the district's sole comprehensive high school.

Zoned campuses in 2009-2010 included Anna S. Canavan Elementary School (pre-kindergarten), Emma Vera Elementary School (grades K-5), Roma Middle School (grades 6–8), and Roma High School (grades 9–12).

== See also ==
- Fronton Island
