= Fronton Island =

Uninhabited island in Texas, United States

- Interactive map of Fronton Island
- Etymology: Fronton, Texas

Geography
- Location: Rio Grande
- Coordinates: 26°24′0″N 99°4′8″W
- Area: 160 acres (65 ha)
- Highest elevation: 177 ft (53.9 m)

Administration
- United States
- State: Texas
- County: Starr County

Fronton Island (also known as Frontón Island and Isla de San Francisco) is an uninhabited island in the Rio Grande in Starr County, Texas.

== Geography ==
Fronton Island lies between two channels of the Rio Grande immediately downstream of Fronton, Texas, across from Los Guerra in Miguel Alemán Municipality, Tamaulipas. It is located about 12 miles (19 km) downstream of the Falcon Dam and about 2 miles (3.2 km) northwest of Roma, Texas. It measures approximately 160 to 170 acres (65 to 69 ha) in area.

A smaller Fronton Island (Spanish: isla Frontón) is located just upstream on the Mexican side of the border in Miguel Alemán Municipality. The American island is sometimes called Isla de San Francisco, which can also refer to a larger island on the Mexican side downstream of Ciudad Miguel Alemán.

== History ==
Fronton Island was formed between 1852 and 1926 when the Rio Grande cut a new channel to the south, which became the main channel by 1955.

As of 1959, Fronton Island was acknowledged as Mexican territory by both the Mexico and United States sections of the International Boundary and Water Commission (IBWC), as the channel that formed the island had cut into Mexican territory to the south. In 1976, the IBWC delineated the international border to the south under the terms of the Boundary Treaty of 1970, placing the island under American jurisdiction.

In the 1980s, the island was used by Mexican ranchers for grazing but was claimed by the Cisneros Ranch of Texas. In 1983, armed fugitives from the Miguel Alemán Municipal Jail hid on the island before their capture, taking advantage of its dense foliage.

=== 2023 state takeover ===
During and before 2023, Fronton Island became a hotspot of human trafficking and drug smuggling. On September 7, Texas Land Commissioner Dawn Buckingham determined that the land was state property and granted the Texas Ranger Division permission to patrol the island as part of Operation Lone Star. In an interview with Fox News, Commissioner Buckingham characterized this declaration as an addition to the state's land area. Under the direction of Texas Governor Greg Abbott, the Texas Ranger Division and Texas Army National Guard occupied Fronton Island on October 2, 2023, and began clearing its vegetation ahead of patrols.

== Flora and fauna ==
Fronton Island's thick bamboo cover is a refuge for several rare bird species. A local botanist raised concern that the Texas Rangers' operation to clear the vegetation would cause the island to erode and wash downstream.
