= Texas Department of Rural Affairs =

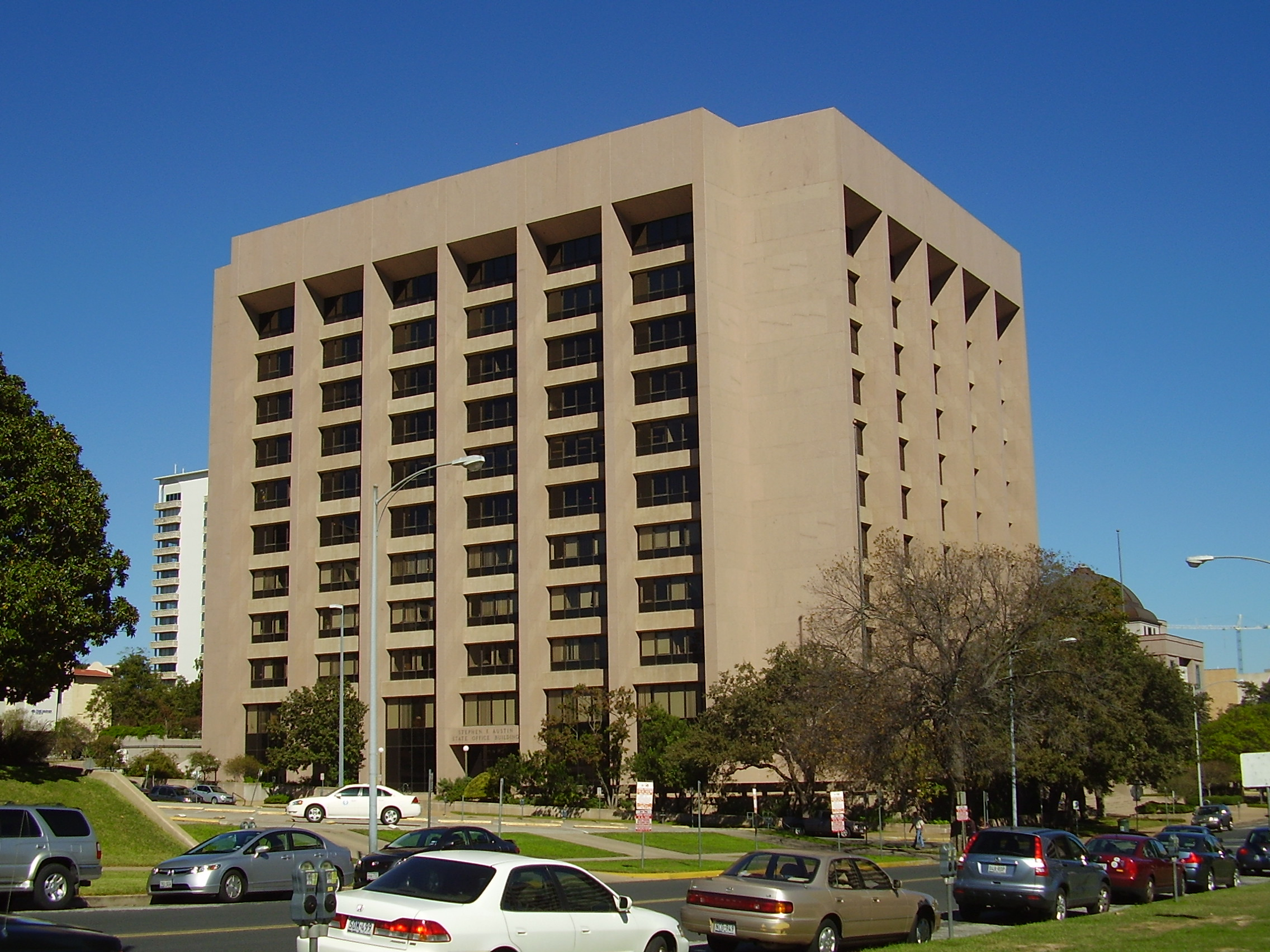
The main offices of the Texas Department of Rural Affairs were located in Suite 220 of the Stephen F. Austin State Office Building

The Texas Department of Rural Affairs (TDRA) was a state agency of Texas. Its headquarters were in Suite 220 in the Stephen F. Austin State Office Building in Austin. The department began as the Office of Community Rule Affairs (ORCA) in 2001 to assist rural communities, and was renamed in 2009.

In 2011, the agency was closed and absorbed by the Texas Department of Agriculture.
