= La Rosita, Texas =

- CDP
- Coordinates: 26°24′06″N 98°55′56″W
- Country: United States
- State: Texas
- County: Starr

Area
  - Total: 0.12 sq mi (0.3 km^{2})
  - Land: 0.12 sq mi (0.3 km^{2})
  - Water: 0 sq mi (0.0 km^{2})
- Elevation: 200 ft (61 m)

Population (2020)
  - Total: 82
  - Density: 710/sq mi (270/km^{2})
- Time zone: UTC-6 (Central (CST))
  - Summer (DST): UTC-5 (CDT)
- Zip Code: 78584, 78582
- FIPS code: 48-41503
- GNIS feature ID: 1852723

La Rosita is a census-designated place (CDP) in Starr County, Texas, United States. The population was 85 at the 2010 census, a decline from the figure of 1,729 tabulated in 2000 due to the Census Bureau redefining the CDP. By the 2020 census, the population further decreased to 82.

== Geography ==
La Rosita is located at 26°24′06″N 98°55′56″W (26.401682, -98.932100).

Prior to the 2010 census, La Rosita CDP gained area, had parts taken to form new CDPs, and lost additional area. As a result, the total area was reduced to 0.1 square miles (0.3 km^{2}), all land.

== Demographics ==
Historical population
Census	Pop.	Note	%±
2000	1,729		—
2010	85		−95.1%
2020	82		−3.5%
U.S. Decennial Census; 1850–1900 1910; 1920 1930 1940; 1950 1960 1970; 1980 1990 2000; 2010 2020

La Rosita was first listed as a census designated place in the 2000 U.S. census. Prior to the 2010 U.S. census, 10 CDPs were carved out from its territory (Anacua, Campo Verde, El Cenizo, Hilltop, La Chuparosa, Los Barreras, Los Ebanos, Miguel Barrera, Rancho Viejo, and Tierra Dorada) substantially reducing its population.

=== 2020 census ===
La Rosita CDP, Texas – Racial and ethnic composition Note: the US Census treats Hispanic/Latino as an ethnic category. This table excludes Latinos from the racial categories and assigns them to a separate category. Hispanics/Latinos may be of any race.
Race / Ethnicity (NH = Non-Hispanic)	Pop 2000	Pop 2010	Pop 2020	% 2000	% 2010	% 2020
White alone (NH)	13	1	0	0.75%	1.18%	0.00%
Black or African American alone (NH)	0	0	0	0.00%	0.00%	0.00%
Native American or Alaska Native alone (NH)	0	0	0	0.00%	0.00%	0.00%
Asian alone (NH)	0	0	0	0.00%	0.00%	0.00%
Native Hawaiian or Pacific Islander alone (NH)	0	0	0	0.00%	0.00%	0.00%
Other race alone (NH)	0	0	0	0.00%	0.00%	0.00%
Mixed race or Multiracial (NH)	0	0	0	0.00%	0.00%	0.00%
Hispanic or Latino (any race)	1,716	84	82	99.25%	98.82%	100.00%
Total	1,729	85	82	100.00%	100.00%	100.00%

At the 2000 census there were 1,729 people, 435 households, and 394 families in the CDP. The population density was 538.3 inhabitants per square mile (207.8/km^{2}). There were 537 housing units at an average density of 167.2 per square mile (64.6/km^{2}). The racial makeup of the CDP was 94.68% White, 4.68% from other races, and 0.64% from two or more races. Hispanic or Latino of any race were 99.25%.

Of the 435 households 65.3% had children under the age of 18 living with them, 71.7% were married couples living together, 15.9% had a female householder with no husband present, and 9.4% were non-families. 9.0% of households were one person and 4.6% were one person aged 65 or older. The average household size was 3.97 and the average family size was 4.23.

The age distribution was 41.7% under the age of 18, 11.0% from 18 to 24, 27.3% from 25 to 44, 14.3% from 45 to 64, and 5.7% 65 or older. The median age was 24 years. For every 100 females, there were 100.3 males. For every 100 females age 18 and over, there were 90.9 males.

The median household income was $12,864 and the median family income was $13,125. Males had a median income of $12,273 versus $10,268 for females. The per capita income for the CDP was $4,228. About 60.3% of families and 58.1% of the population were below the poverty line, including 68.8% of those under age 18 and 33.3% of those age 65 or over.

== Government and infrastructure ==
The La Rosita Fire Department station is adjacent to the 2010-2020 La Rosita CDP, and within the former 2000 La Rosita CDP.

== Education ==
Public education in the community of La Rosita is provided by the Roma Independent School District. The zoned elementary school is Delia Gonzalez (DG) Garcia Elementary School, which is adjacent to the 2010-2020 CDP, and within the former 2000 CDP.

Zoned campuses in 2009-2010 included Anna S. Canavan Elementary School (pre-kindergarten), R.T. Barrera Elementary School (grades K-5), Ramiro Barrera Middle School (grades 6–8), and Roma High School (grades 9–12).
