= Escobares, Texas =

- City
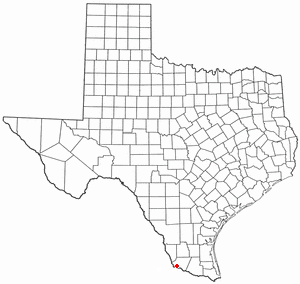
- Location of Escobares, Texas

- Coordinates: 26°24′43″N 98°57′37″W
- Country: United States
- State: Texas
- County: Starr

Area
  - Total: 2.72 sq mi (7.05 km^{2})
  - Land: 2.67 sq mi (6.92 km^{2})
  - Water: 0.050 sq mi (0.13 km^{2})
- Elevation: 180 ft (55 m)

Population (2020)
  - Total: 2,588
  - Density: 969/sq mi (374/km^{2})
- Time zone: UTC-6 (Central (CST))
  - Summer (DST): UTC-5 (CDT)
- ZIP code: 78584, 78582
- Area code: 956
- FIPS code: 48-24552
- GNIS feature ID: 1335491

Escobares is a city in Starr County, Texas, United States. The population was 2,588 at the 2020 census. The city was formed in 2005 from part of the deleted Escobares CDP, and parts of Garceno, and North Escobares CDPs, and additional area. Prior to its 2005 incorporation as a city, it was a census-designated place (CDP). The population of the CDP was 1,954 at the 2000 census.

== Geography ==
Escobares is located at 26°24′43″N 98°57′37″W (26.412009, –98.960138).

Escobares gained area when it became a city, giving it a total area of 2.7 square miles (7.0 km^{2}), of which 2.6 square mile (6.7 km^{2}) is land and 0.1 square mile (0.3 km^{2}) (6.86%) is water.

== Demographics ==
Historical population
Census	Pop.	Note	%±
1990	1,705		—
2000	1,954		14.6%
2010	1,188		−39.2%
2020	2,588		117.8%
U.S. Decennial Census; 1850–1900 1910; 1920 1930 1940; 1950 1960 1970; 1980 1990 2000; 2010 2020

Escobares was first listed as a census designated place in the 1990 U.S. census and listed as a city in the 2010 U.S. census after incorporation in 2005.

=== Racial and ethnic composition ===
Escobares city, Texas – Racial and ethnic composition Note: the US Census treats Hispanic/Latino as an ethnic category. This table excludes Latinos from the racial categories and assigns them to a separate category. Hispanics/Latinos may be of any race.
Race / Ethnicity (NH = Non-Hispanic)	Pop 2000	Pop 2010	Pop 2020	% 2000	% 2010	% 2020
White alone (NH)	25	86	24	1.28%	7.24%	0.93%
Black or African American alone (NH)	0	0	0	0.00%	0.00%	0.00%
Native American or Alaska Native alone (NH)	0	0	0	0.00%	0.00%	0.00%
Asian alone (NH)	0	0	0	0.00%	0.00%	0.00%
Pacific Islander alone (NH)	0	0	0	0.00%	0.00%	0.00%
Some Other Race alone (NH)	0	0	0	0.00%	0.00%	0.00%
Mixed race or Multiracial (NH)	0	0	2	0.00%	0.00%	0.08%
Hispanic or Latino (any race)	1,929	1,102	2,562	98.72%	92.76%	99.00%
Total	1,954	1,188	2,588	100.00%	100.00%	100.00%

=== 2020 census ===
As of the 2020 census, there were 2,588 people in Escobares; the median age was 32.7 years, 29.5% of residents were under the age of 18, and 14.0% were 65 years of age or older.

For every 100 females there were 88.5 males, and for every 100 females age 18 and over there were 88.0 males age 18 and over.

92.3% of residents lived in urban areas, while 7.7% lived in rural areas.

There were 763 households in Escobares, of which 48.8% had children under the age of 18 living in them. Of all households, 48.6% were married-couple households, 14.9% were households with a male householder and no spouse or partner present, and 31.6% were households with a female householder and no spouse or partner present. About 14.8% of all households were made up of individuals and 6.9% had someone living alone who was 65 years of age or older.

There were 871 housing units, of which 12.4% were vacant. The homeowner vacancy rate was 0.7% and the rental vacancy rate was 4.3%.

Racial composition as of the 2020 census
Race	Number	Percent
White	829	32.0%
Black or African American	0	0.0%
American Indian and Alaska Native	11	0.4%
Asian	0	0.0%
Native Hawaiian and Other Pacific Islander	0	0.0%
Some other race	353	13.6%
Two or more races	1,395	53.9%
Hispanic or Latino (of any race)	2,562	99.0%

=== 2010 census ===
At the 2010 census the city of Escobares had a population of 1,188. The racial composition of the population was 98.3% white (7.2% non-Hispanic white), 1.6% from some other race and 0.1% from two or more races. 92.8% of the population was Hispanic or Latino with 92.3% identifying as being ethnically Mexican.

=== 2000 census ===
As of the census of 2000, there were 1,954 people, 516 households, and 464 families residing in the CDP. The population density was 2,044.8 inhabitants per square mile (789.5/km^{2}). There were 598 housing units at an average density of 625.8 per square mile (241.6/km^{2}). The racial makeup of the CDP was 88.33% White, 0.15% African American, 0.26% Native American, 0.05% Pacific Islander, 9.67% from other races, and 1.54% from two or more races. Hispanic or Latino of any race were 98.72% of the population.

There were 516 households, out of which 58.3% had children under the age of 18 living with them, 66.1% were married couples living together, 20.7% had a female householder with no husband present, and 9.9% were non-families. 9.1% of all households were made up of individuals, and 6.2% had someone living alone who was 65 years of age or older. The average household size was 3.79 and the average family size was 4.05.

In the CDP, the population was spread out, with 39.3% under the age of 18, 12.3% from 18 to 24, 24.9% from 25 to 44, 17.3% from 45 to 64, and 6.1% who were 65 years of age or older. The median age was 24 years. For every 100 females, there were 96.4 males. For every 100 females age 18 and over, there were 82.7 males.

The median income for a household in the CDP was $15,884, and the median income for a family was $16,677. Males had a median income of $16,167 versus $11,298 for females. The per capita income for the CDP was $5,726. About 51.2% of the families and 50.8% of the population were below the poverty line, including 50.8% of those under age 18 and 60.9% of those age 65 or over. In 2019 the BBC reported that 62% of residents lived below the poverty line, the highest rate of any US city with more than 1,000 people according to the 2016 US Census Bureau survey.

== Education ==
Public education in the city of Escobares is provided by the Roma Independent School District. Circa 2022 zoned elementary campuses include DG Garcia Elementary School (formerly Ynes B. Escobar Elementary School), Veterans Memorial Elementary School, and R. T. Barrera Elementary School. Roma High School is the district's sole comprehensive high school.

Circa 2010 zoned campuses included Anna S. Canavan Elementary School (pre-K), Escobar Elementary (grades K–5), Ramiro Barrera Middle School (grades 6–8), and Roma High School (grades 9–12).

== Government and infrastructure ==
The city opened its first fire station, a $560,000 facility, on August 2, 2011. The Texas Department of Rural Affairs provided a $531,000 block grant to help build the station.
