= Box Canyon-Amistad, Texas =

- Former CDP
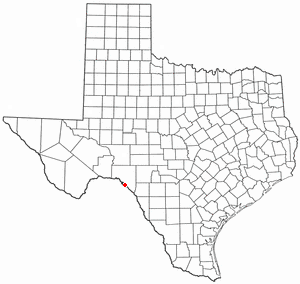
- Location of Box Canyon-Amistad, Texas

- Coordinates: 29°31′42″N 101°10′8″W
- Country: United States
- State: Texas
- County: Val Verde

Area
  - Total: 4.0 sq mi (10.4 km^{2})
  - Land: 4.0 sq mi (10.4 km^{2})
  - Water: 0 sq mi (0.0 km^{2})

Population (2000)
  - Total: 76
  - Density: 19/sq mi (7.3/km^{2})
- Time zone: UTC-6 (Central (CST))
  - Summer (DST): UTC-5 (CDT)
- FIPS code: 48-09658

Box Canyon-Amistad was a census-designated place (CDP) in Val Verde County, Texas, United States. The population was 76 at the 2000 census. For the 2010 census, the area was delineated as two separate CDPs, Amistad and Box Canyon.

== Geography ==
Box Canyon-Amistad was located at 29°31′42″N 101°10′8″W (29.528215, -101.168849).

According to the United States Census Bureau, the CDP had a total area of 4.0 square miles (10.4 km^{2}), all of it land.

== Demographics ==
Historical population
Census	Pop.	Note	%±
2000	76		—
U.S. Decennial Census; 1850–1900 1910; 1920 1930 1940; 1950 1960 1970; 1980 1990 2000; 2010

Box Canyon-Amistad first appeared as a census designated place in the 2000 U.S. census; prior to the 2010 U.S. census it was split into the Box Canyon CDP and the Amistad CDP.

=== 2000 census ===
Box Canyon-Amistad CDP, Texas – Racial and ethnic composition Note: the US Census treats Hispanic/Latino as an ethnic category. This table excludes Latinos from the racial categories and assigns them to a separate category. Hispanics/Latinos may be of any race.
Race / Ethnicity (NH = Non-Hispanic)	Pop 2000	% 2000
White alone (NH)	73	96.05%
Black or African American alone (NH)	0	0.00%
Native American or Alaska Native alone (NH)	1	1.32%
Asian alone (NH)	0	0.00%
Pacific Islander alone (NH)	0	0.00%
Other race alone (NH)	0	0.00%
Mixed race or Multiracial (NH)	0	0.00%
Hispanic or Latino (any race)	2	2.63%
Total	76	100.00%

As of the census of 2000, there were 76 people, 43 households, and 23 families residing in the CDP. The population density was 18.9 people per square mile (7.3/km^{2}). There were 135 housing units at an average density of 33.6 per square mile (13.0/km^{2}). The racial makeup of the CDP was 98.68% White and 1.32% Native American. Hispanic or Latino of any race were 2.63% of the population.

There were 43 households, out of which 2.3% had children under the age of 18 living with them, 48.8% were married couples living together, 2.3% had a female householder with no husband present, and 46.5% were non-families. 46.5% of all households were made up of individuals, and 18.6% had someone living alone who was 65 years of age or older. The average household size was 1.77 and the average family size was 2.43.

In the CDP, the population was spread out, with 3.9% under the age of 18, 1.3% from 18 to 24, 9.2% from 25 to 44, 50.0% from 45 to 64, and 35.5% who were 65 years of age or older. The median age was 61 years. For every 100 females, there were 111.1 males. For every 100 females age 18 and over, there were 108.6 males.

The median income for a household in the CDP was $20,833, and the median income for a family was $24,688. Males had a median income of $38,750 versus $39,167 for females. The per capita income for the CDP was $19,721. There were no families and 15.5% of the population living below the poverty line, including no under eighteens and none of those over 64.

== Education ==
The area is served by the Comstock Independent School District.

The whole county is served by Southwest Texas Junior College according to the Texas Education Code.
