= Cienegas Terrace, Texas =

Census-designated place in Val Verde County, Texas, United States

- CDP
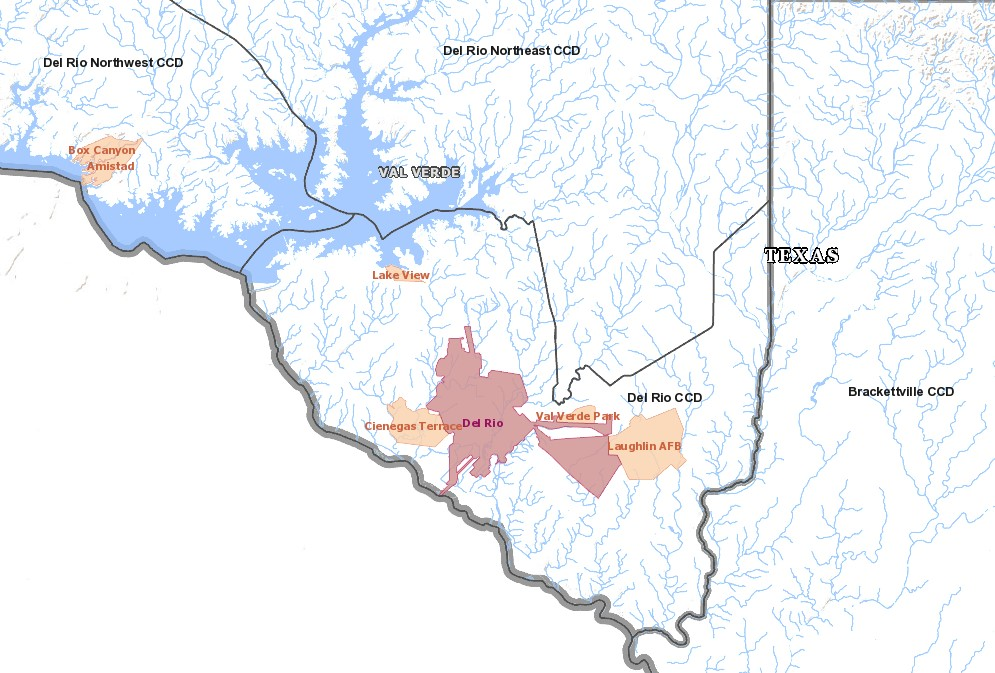
- Neighboring communities

- Location within the state of Texas
- Coordinates: 29°22′27″N 100°56′50″W
- Country: United States
- State: Texas
- County: Val Verde

Area
  - Total: 3.2 sq mi (8.4 km^{2})
  - Land: 3.2 sq mi (8.3 km^{2})
  - Water: 0.039 sq mi (0.1 km^{2})
- Elevation: 942 ft (287 m)

Population (2020)
  - Total: 3,025
  - Density: 940/sq mi (360/km^{2})
- Time zone: UTC-6 (Central (CST))
  - Summer (DST): UTC-5 (CDT)
- Zip Code: 78840
- FIPS code: 48-14927
- GNIS feature ID: 2407621

Cienegas Terrace is a census-designated place (CDP) in Val Verde County, Texas, United States. As of the 2020 census, Cienegas Terrace had a population of 3,025.

== Geography ==
According to the United States Census Bureau, the CDP has a total area of 3.2 square miles (8.4 km^{2}), of which 3.2 square miles (8.3 km^{2}) is land and 0.04 square miles (0.1 km^{2}), or 1.61%, is water.

== Demographics ==
Historical population
Census	Pop.	Note	%±
2010	3,424		—
2020	3,025		−11.7%
U.S. Decennial Census; 1850–1900 1910; 1920 1930 1940; 1950 1960 1970; 1980 1990 2000; 2010

Cienegas Terrace first appeared as a census designated place in the 2010 U.S. census.

=== Racial and ethnic composition ===
Cienegas Terrace CDP, Texas – Racial and ethnic composition Note: the US Census treats Hispanic/Latino as an ethnic category. This table excludes Latinos from the racial categories and assigns them to a separate category. Hispanics/Latinos may be of any race.
Race / Ethnicity (NH = Non-Hispanic)	Pop 2010	Pop 2020	% 2010	% 2020
White alone (NH)	107	81	3.13%	2.68%
Black or African American alone (NH)	12	5	0.35%	0.17%
Native American or Alaska Native alone (NH)	1	1	0.03%	0.03%
Asian alone (NH)	4	6	0.12%	0.20%
Native Hawaiian or Pacific Islander alone (NH)	0	0	0.00%	0.00%
Other race alone (NH)	2	3	0.06%	0.10%
Mixed race or Multiracial (NH)	9	7	0.26%	0.23%
Hispanic or Latino (any race)	3,289	2,922	96.06%	96.60%
Total	3,424	3,025	100.00%	100.00%

=== 2020 census ===
As of the 2020 census, Cienegas Terrace had a population of 3,025. The median age was 31.7 years. 30.7% of residents were under the age of 18 and 12.0% of residents were 65 years of age or older. For every 100 females there were 96.4 males, and for every 100 females age 18 and over there were 89.4 males age 18 and over.

95.9% of residents lived in urban areas, while 4.1% lived in rural areas.

There were 847 households in Cienegas Terrace, of which 46.5% had children under the age of 18 living in them. Of all households, 59.9% were married-couple households, 13.0% were households with a male householder and no spouse or partner present, and 25.0% were households with a female householder and no spouse or partner present. About 13.8% of all households were made up of individuals and 6.1% had someone living alone who was 65 years of age or older.

There were 990 housing units, of which 14.4% were vacant. The homeowner vacancy rate was 1.1% and the rental vacancy rate was 5.4%.

=== 2000 census ===
As of the census of 2000, there were 2,878 people, 699 households, and 652 families residing in the CDP. The population density was 898.3 inhabitants per square mile (346.8/km^{2}). There were 795 housing units at an average density of 248.1 per square mile (95.8/km^{2}). The racial makeup of the CDP was 58.48% White, 0.59% African American, 0.52% Native American, 0.28% Asian, 38.81% from other races, and 1.32% from two or more races. Hispanic or Latino of any race were 95.17% of the population.

There were 699 households, out of which 64.5% had children under the age of 18 living with them, 79.4% were married couples living together, 11.2% had a female householder with no husband present, and 6.6% were non-families. 6.0% of all households were made up of individuals, and 2.4% had someone living alone who was 65 years of age or older. The average household size was 4.12 and the average family size was 4.28.

In the CDP, the population was spread out, with 41.8% under the age of 18, 9.8% from 18 to 24, 27.5% from 25 to 44, 15.8% from 45 to 64, and 5.1% who were 65 years of age or older. The median age was 24 years. For every 100 females, there were 96.2 males. For every 100 females age 18 and over, there were 93.1 males.

The median income for a household in the CDP was $20,719, and the median income for a family was $22,328. Males had a median income of $17,434 versus $18,409 for females. The per capita income for the CDP was $6,936. About 42.8% of families and 43.8% of the population were below the poverty line, including 48.0% of those under age 18 and 60.1% of those age 65 or over.

== Education ==
Cienegas Terrace is served by the San Felipe Del Rio Consolidated Independent School District.

The whole county is served by Southwest Texas Junior College according to the Texas Education Code.

== See also ==
- List of census-designated places in Texas
