= Amistad, Texas =

- CDP
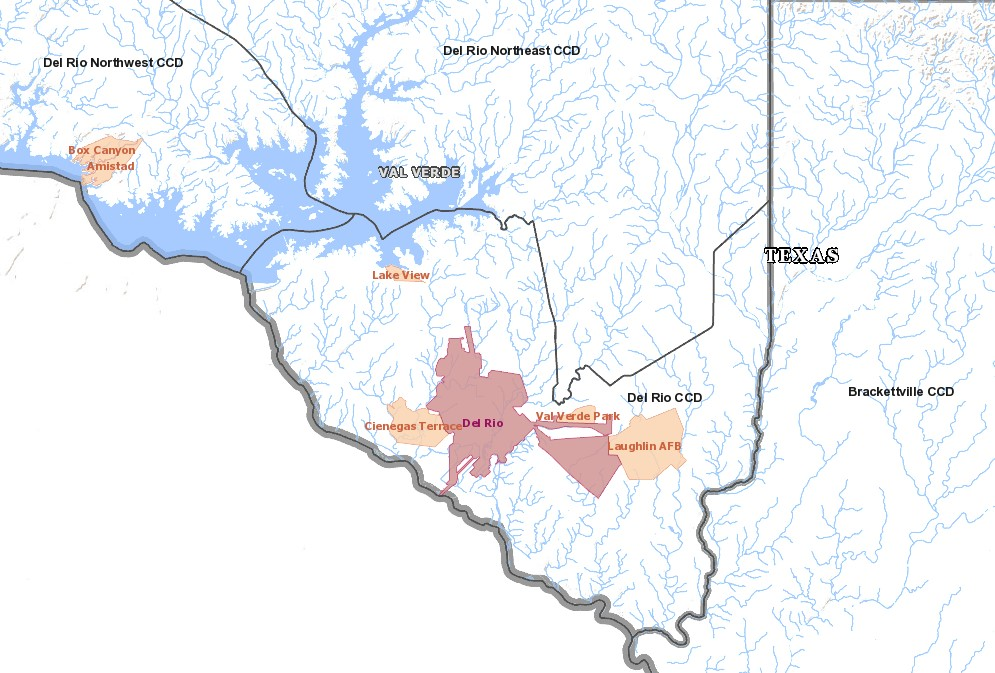

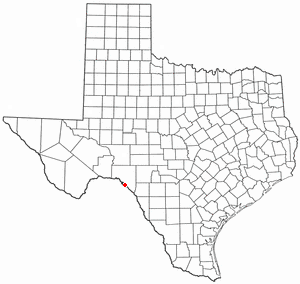
- Location of Amistad, Texas

- Coordinates: 29°31′28″N 101°09′11″W
- Country: United States
- State: Texas
- County: Val Verde

Area
  - Total: 1.5 sq mi (3.9 km^{2})
  - Land: 1.5 sq mi (3.9 km^{2})
  - Water: 0 sq mi (0.0 km^{2})
- Elevation: 1,184 ft (361 m)

Population (2020)
  - Total: 24
  - Density: 16/sq mi (6.2/km^{2})
- GNIS feature ID: 2584604

Amistad is a census-designated place (CDP) in Val Verde County, Texas, United States. As of the 2020 census, Amistad had a population of 24. This CDP was formed prior to the 2010 census from parts of the deleted Box Canyon-Amistad CDP.

== Geography ==
According to the United States Census Bureau, the CDP has a total area of 1.5 square miles (3.9 km^{2}), all land.

== Education ==
Amistad is in the Comstock Independent School District.

The whole county is served by Southwest Texas Junior College, according to the Texas Education Code.

== Demographics ==
Historical population
Census	Pop.	Note	%±
2010	53		—
2020	24		−54.7%
U.S. Decennial Census; 1850–1900 1910; 1920 1930 1940; 1950 1960 1970; 1980 1990 2000; 2010

Amistad first appeared as a census designated place in the 2010 U.S. census, one of two CDPs carved out of the deleted Box Canyon-Amistad CDP

=== 2020 census ===
Amistad CDP, Texas – Racial and ethnic composition Note: the US Census treats Hispanic/Latino as an ethnic category. This table excludes Latinos from the racial categories and assigns them to a separate category. Hispanics/Latinos may be of any race.
Race / Ethnicity (NH = Non-Hispanic)	Pop 2010	Pop 2020	% 2010	% 2020
White alone (NH)	38	16	71.70%	66.67%
Black or African American alone (NH)	0	0	0.00%	0.00%
Native American or Alaska Native alone (NH)	0	0	0.00%	0.00%
Asian alone (NH)	1	0	1.89%	0.00%
Native Hawaiian or Pacific Islander alone (NH)	0	0	0.00%	0.00%
Other race alone (NH)	0	0	0.00%	0.00%
Mixed race or Multiracial (NH)	0	2	0.00%	8.33%
Hispanic or Latino (any race)	14	6	26.42%	25.00%
Total	53	24	0.00%	0.00%

== See also ==
- Box Canyon-Amistad, Texas
