= Box Canyon, Texas =

- CDP
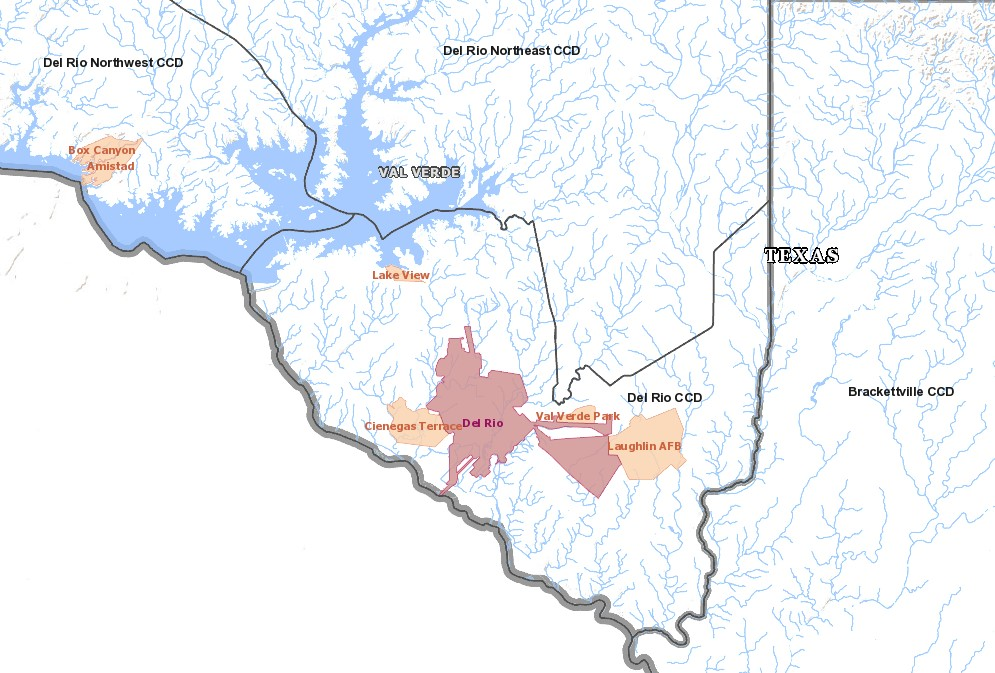

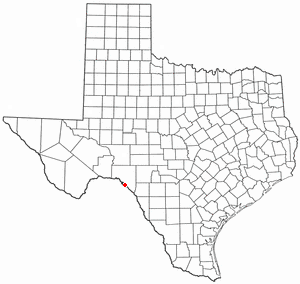
- Location of Box Canyon, Texas

- Coordinates: 29°32′01″N 101°09′31″W
- Country: United States
- State: Texas
- County: Val Verde

Area
  - Total: 1.4 sq mi (3.7 km^{2})
  - Land: 1.4 sq mi (3.7 km^{2})
  - Water: 0 sq mi (0.0 km^{2})
- Elevation: 1,194 ft (364 m)

Population (2020)
  - Total: 29
  - Density: 20/sq mi (7.8/km^{2})
- Time zone: UTC-6 (Central (CST))
  - Summer (DST): UTC-5 (CDT)
- Zip Code: 78840
- FIPS code: 48-09656
- GNIS feature ID: 2584613

Box Canyon is a census-designated place (CDP) in Val Verde County, Texas, United States. As of the 2020 census, Box Canyon had a population of 29. This CDP was formed prior to the 2010 census from parts of the deleted Box Canyon-Amistad CDP.

== Geography ==
According to the United States Census Bureau, the CDP has a total area of 1.4 square miles (3.7 km^{2}), all land.

== Demographics ==
Historical population
Census	Pop.	Note	%±
2010	34		—
2020	29		−14.7%
U.S. Decennial Census; 1850–1900 1910; 1920 1930 1940; 1950 1960 1970; 1980 1990 2000; 2010 2020

Box Canyon first appeared as a census designated place in the 2010 U.S. census, one of two CDPs carved out of the deleted Box Canyon-Amistad CDP

=== 2020 census ===
Box Canyon CDP, Texas – Racial and ethnic composition Note: the US Census treats Hispanic/Latino as an ethnic category. This table excludes Latinos from the racial categories and assigns them to a separate category. Hispanics/Latinos may be of any race.
Race / Ethnicity (NH = Non-Hispanic)	Pop 2010	Pop 2020	% 2010	% 2020
White alone (NH)	19	19	55.88%	65.52%
Black or African American alone (NH)	0	0	0.00%	0.00%
Native American or Alaska Native alone (NH)	0	1	0.00%	3.45%
Asian alone (NH)	0	0	0.00%	0.00%
Native Hawaiian or Pacific Islander alone (NH)	0	0	0.00%	0.00%
Other race alone (NH)	0	0	0.00%	0.00%
Mixed race or Multiracial (NH)	0	1	0.00%	3.45%
Hispanic or Latino (any race)	15	8	44.12%	27.59%
Total	34	29	0.00%	0.00%

== Education ==
The area is served by the Comstock Independent School District.

The whole county is served by Southwest Texas Junior College, according to the Texas Education Code.

== See also ==
- Box Canyon-Amistad, Texas, name of CDP at 2000 census
