= National Register of Historic Places listings in Val Verde County, Texas =

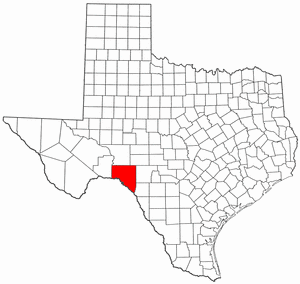
Location of Val Verde County in Texas

This is a list of the National Register Historic Places in Val Verde County, Texas

This is intended to be a complete list of properties and districts listed on the National Register of Historic Places in Val Verde County, Texas. There are seven districts and five individual properties listed on the National Register in the county. These include one National Historic Landmark District, one State Historic Site, one State Antiquities Landmark, and one Recorded Texas Historic Landmark.

This National Park Service list is complete through NPS recent listings posted May 1, 2026.

== Current listings ==
The publicly disclosed locations of National Register properties and districts may be seen in a mapping service provided.

	Name on the Register	Image	Date listed	Location	City or town	Description
1	Cassinelli Gin House		September 4, 1986 (#86002188)	Corner of Pecan and Academy Sts. 29°21′13″N 100°53′48″W	Del Rio	Recorded Texas Historic Landmark
2	Del Rio Cemeteries Historic District		July 11, 2003 (#03000664)	Roughly bounded by W 2nd St., Johnson Blvd., and St. Peter's St. 29°21′43″N 100°55′00″W	Del Rio	
3	Lower Pecos Canyonlands Archeological District	Lower Pecos Canyonlands Archeological District	January 13, 2021 (#100006256)	Lower Pecos River watershed area	Comstock	Thirty-five mostly discontiguous rock art and other archeological sites; also listed in part in several other listings in this county, including Seminole Canyon Archeological District, Lower Pecos Canyon Archeological District, Mile Canyon, and the Rattlesnake Canyon Site.
4	Lower Pecos Canyon Archeological District	Lower Pecos Canyon Archeological District	March 31, 1971 (#71000966)	Address restricted	Comstock	
5	Mile Canyon	Mile Canyon	October 15, 1970 (#70000773)	Just downstream from Langtry; 29°48′35″N 101°33′01″W	Langtry	Also known as Eagle Nest Canyon
6	Rattlesnake Canyon Site	Rattlesnake Canyon Site	September 28, 1971 (#71000968)	Address restricted	Langtry	
7	San Felipe Creek Archeological District	San Felipe Creek Archeological District	October 16, 1974 (#74002096)	Address restricted	Del Rio	
8	Seminole Canyon Archeological District	Seminole Canyon Archeological District	January 25, 1971 (#71000967)	Between US 90 and the Rio Grande west of Comstock; 29°41′00″N 101°19′06″W	Comstock	State Historic Site
9	Seven Mile Ranch Archeological District	Seven Mile Ranch Archeological District	November 16, 1990 (#90001733)	Address restricted	Comstock	
10	Southern Pacific Passenger Depot	Southern Pacific Passenger Depot	February 2, 2026 (#100012685)	101 W. Ogden Street; 29°21′45″N 100°54′08″W	Del Rio	
11	Val Verde County Courthouse And Jail	Val Verde County Courthouse And Jail	August 18, 1977 (#77001478)	400 Pecan St. 29°21′32″N 100°53′50″W	Del Rio	State Antiquities Landmark
12	West of Pecos Railroad Camps District	West of Pecos Railroad Camps District	April 3, 1973 (#73001982)	Address restricted	Comstock	

== See also ==
- National Register of Historic Places listings in Texas
- List of Texas State Historic Sites
- Recorded Texas Historic Landmarks in Val Verde County
