= Seminole Canyon State Park and Historic Site =

State park in Texas, United States

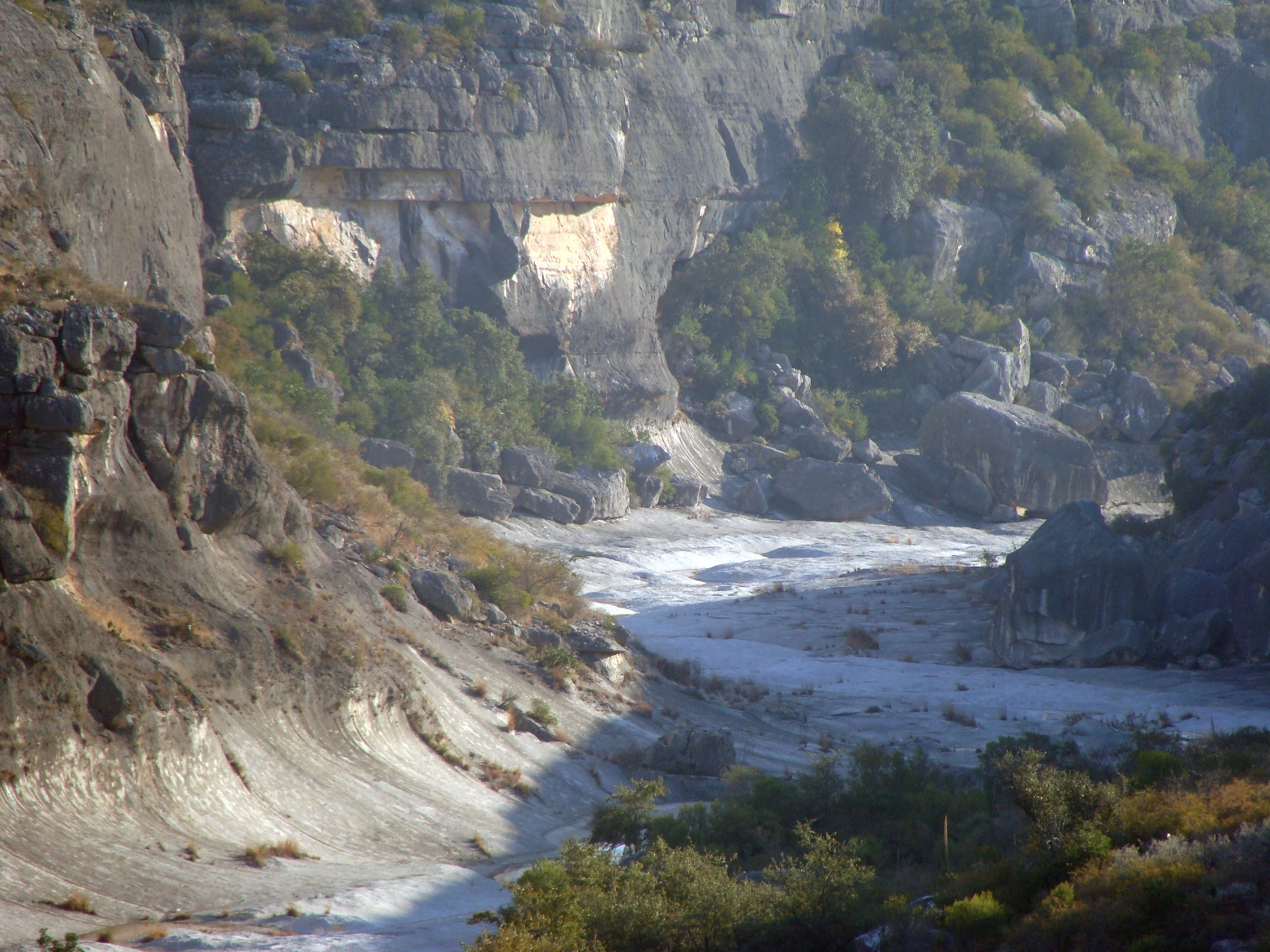

- Location within Texas Location within the United States
- Location: Val Verde County, USA
- Nearest city: Comstock, Texas
- Coordinates: 29°41′00″N 101°19′06″W
- Area: 2,172.5 acres (879.2 ha)
- Established: 1980
- Visitors: 27,227 (in 2022)
- Governing body: Texas Parks and Wildlife Department
- Seminole Canyon Archeological District
- U.S. National Register of Historic Places
- U.S. Historic district
- U.S. National Historic Landmark District – Contributing property
- Texas State Historic Site
- Location: Address restricted
- Area: 1,334.4 acres (540.0 ha)
- Part of: Portions included in Lower Pecos Canyonlands Archeological District (ID100006256)
- NRHP reference No.: 71000967

Significant dates
- Added to NRHP: January 25, 1971
- Designated NHLDCP: January 13, 2021
- Designated TSHS: 1974

Seminole Canyon State Park and Historic Site is a state park in the U.S. state of Texas. It is located off U.S. Route 90, east of the Pecos River High Bridge, 9 miles (14 km) west of Comstock in Val Verde County. The park is conducive to camping, biking, bird watching, back packing and archeological study. Cave art and archeological artifacts date back to the earliest human habitation in the area. The park is part of the larger Seminole Canyon Archeological District on the National Register of Historic Places.

== History ==
Seminole Canyon State Park and Historic Site is a 2,172.5-acre (879.2 ha) site operated by the Texas Parks and Wildlife Department. It is located off U.S. Route 90 in Val Verde County, and is accessible via Park Road 67. It is adjacent to Amistad National Recreation Area. It is estimated that human habitation of the area began 10,000 years ago, during the Holocene era when mammoth animals would have also inhabited the area. Vegetation is believed to have been a denser and richer variety to support the life of the area. The erosion that happened over the ages can be seen in some of the area rock walls. Indigenous peoples began to leave cave art evidence of their presence some 2,000–8,000 years ago.

Gaspar Castaño de Sosa is believed to have been the first European to arrive in the area, during his 1591 trek up the Rio Grande and along the Pecos River, in his effort to establish Spanish colonization of New Mexico. During the 19th century the Black Seminole Scouts of the United States Army were stationed to the area, giving the region its name. The Southern Pacific Railroad was built into the area in 1882.

13,344 acres (5,400 ha) of the area was named in 1971 as the Seminole Canyon Archeological District on the National Register of Historic Places listings in Val Verde County, Texas. In 1985, a boundary increase of 14,170 acres (5,730 ha) was added to the listing in the National Register.

The Texas Parks and Wildlife Department purchased 2,172.5 acres (879.2 ha) in two phases. 1,500 acres (610 ha) were purchased in 1974, and 700 acres (280 ha) were purchased in 1977. The park opened in 1980.

Plans were developed in 2026 to build vehicle barriers and patrol roads through the park as the border security project.

== Indigenous rock paintings ==
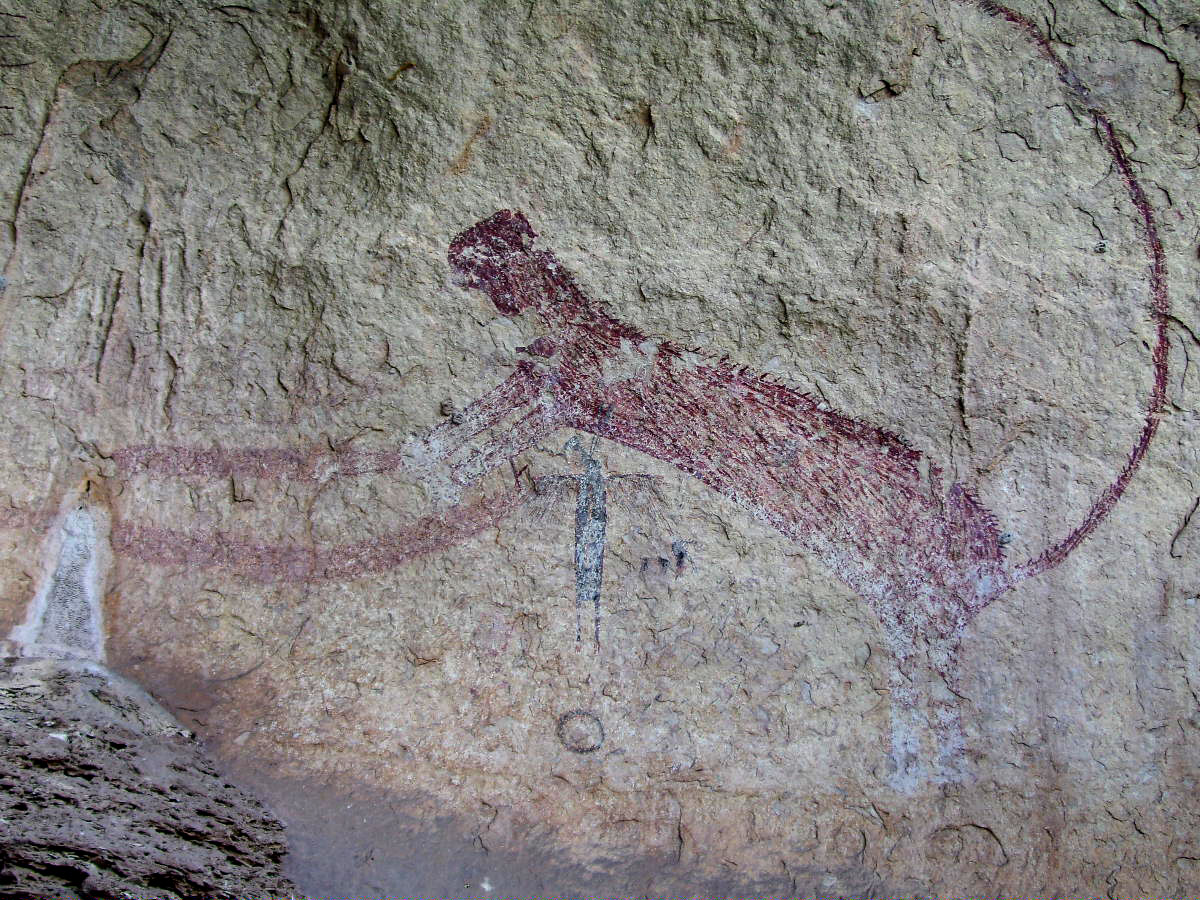
Panther of the cave

Rock paintings found in the park are of the Pecos River Style. Tours of the Fate Bell Shelter are conducted for the park by volunteers from the non-profit Rock Art Foundation.

Panther Cave can only be viewed either from a distance along a hiking trail, or by boat boarded at the National Park Service dock in Amistad National Recreation Area. The cave derives its name from a painting of a leaping panther. Art in the cave dates back to an estimated 7,000 B.C. The large cat theme figures throughout the art, including humans with cat-ear head adornments

Fate Bell Shelter is named for the one-time owner of the land, Mr. Fayette Bell. First excavated in 1932 and later in 1963, the cave art and indigenous artifacts are believed to be some of the oldest in North America.

== Facilities ==
Outside the entrance to the Visitors Center is The Maker of Peace, a 17-foot bronze statue created by Texas artist Bill Worrell in 1994.

Seminole Canyon State Park and nearby Amistad National Recreation Area are conducive to bird watching. Both are habitats for numerous species of canyon, desert, and seed-eating birds.

Nine miles of trails lend to hiking and mountain biking. The canyons and Fate Bell Shelter are only accessible on guided tours.

The park has a restroom with showers. Campsites range from the very primitive with no conveniences, to some campsites with only water or campsites with both water and electricity. There is also a trailer dump station.

Wireless Internet access (Wi-Fi) is available in some areas of this site.

== Gallery ==
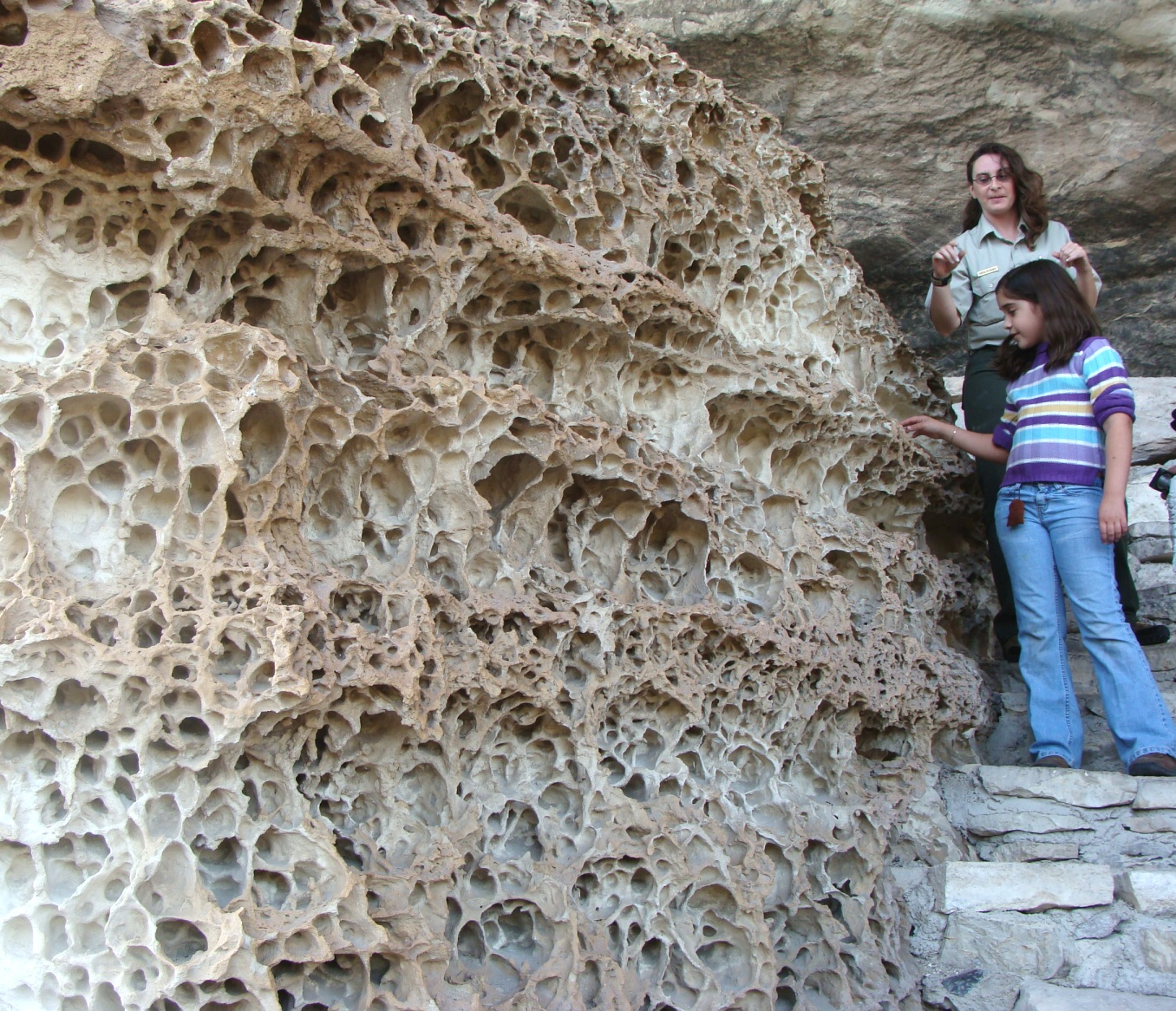
Honeycomb weathering in the canyon

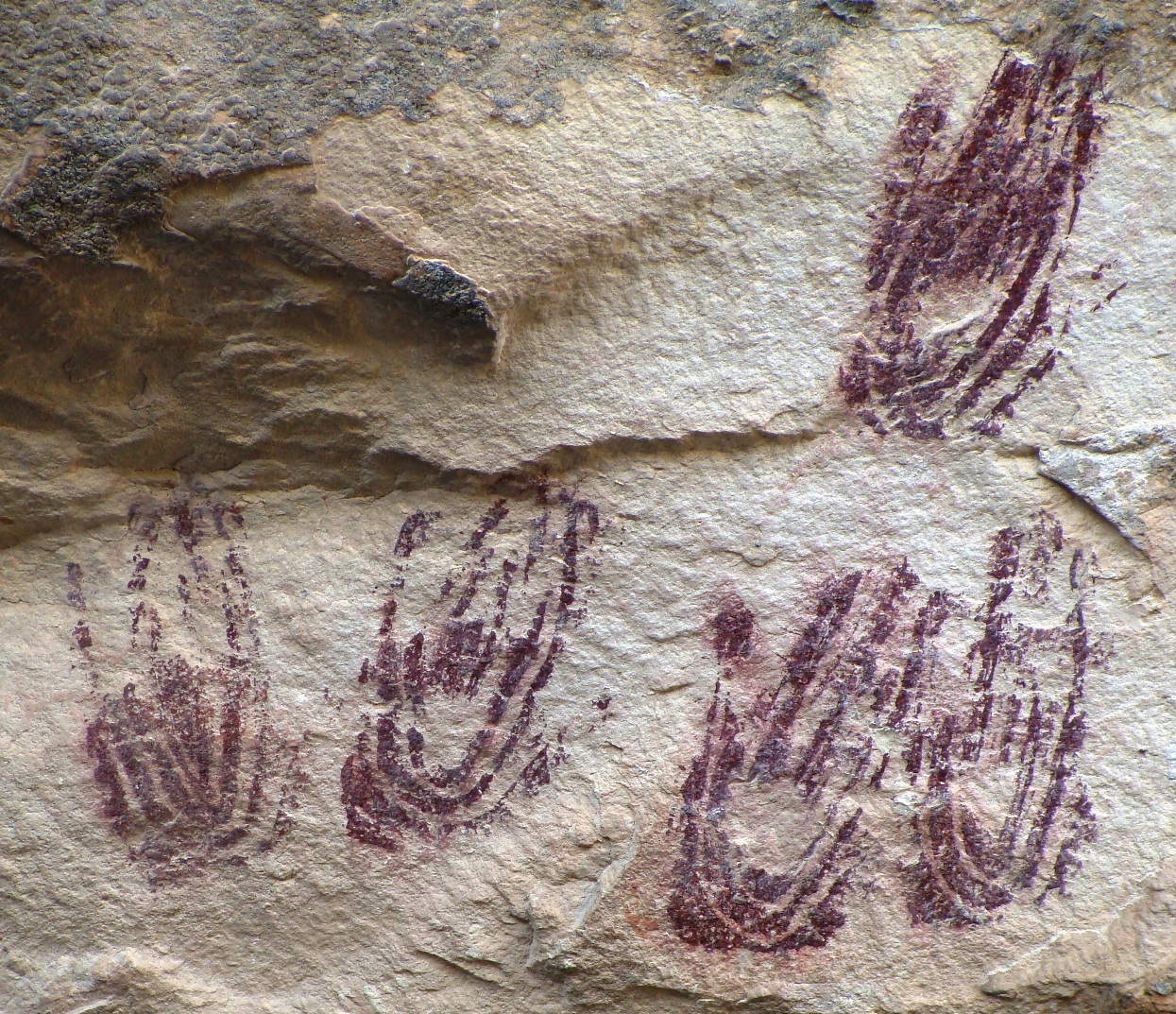
Pictograph in rock shelter

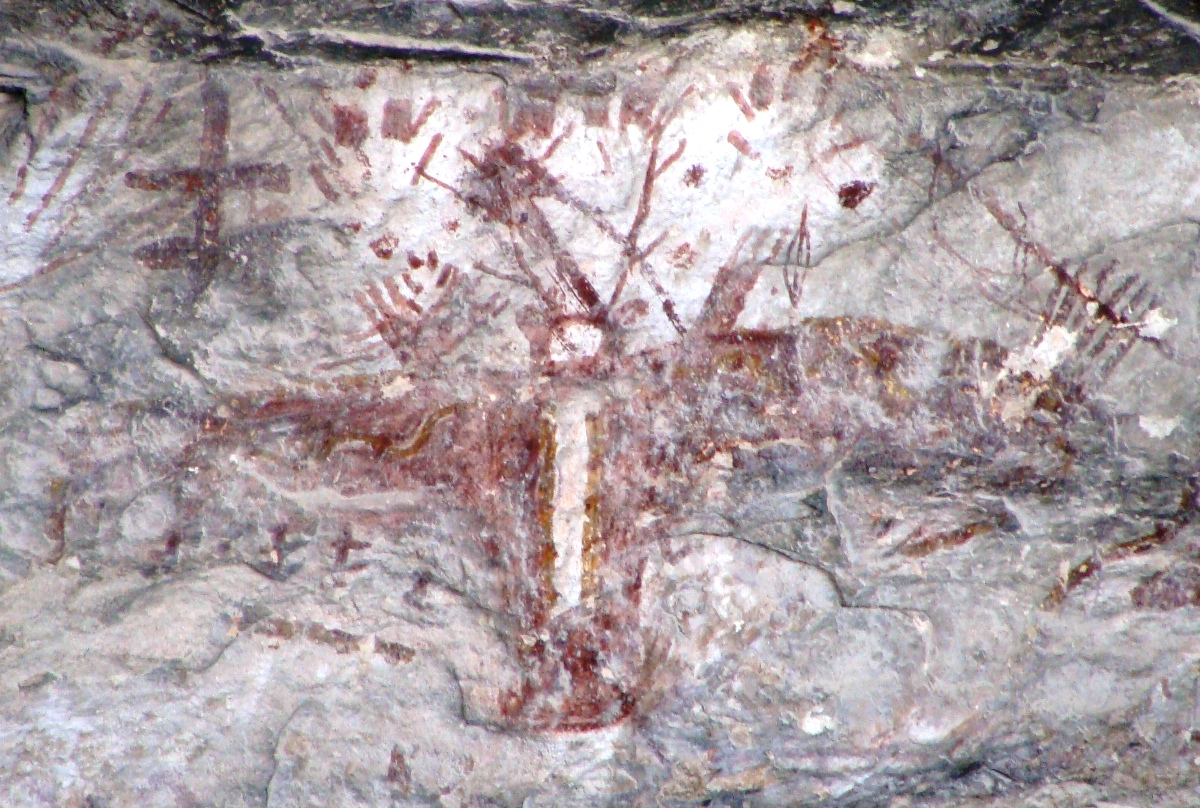
Pictograph of shape shifting bear with antlers

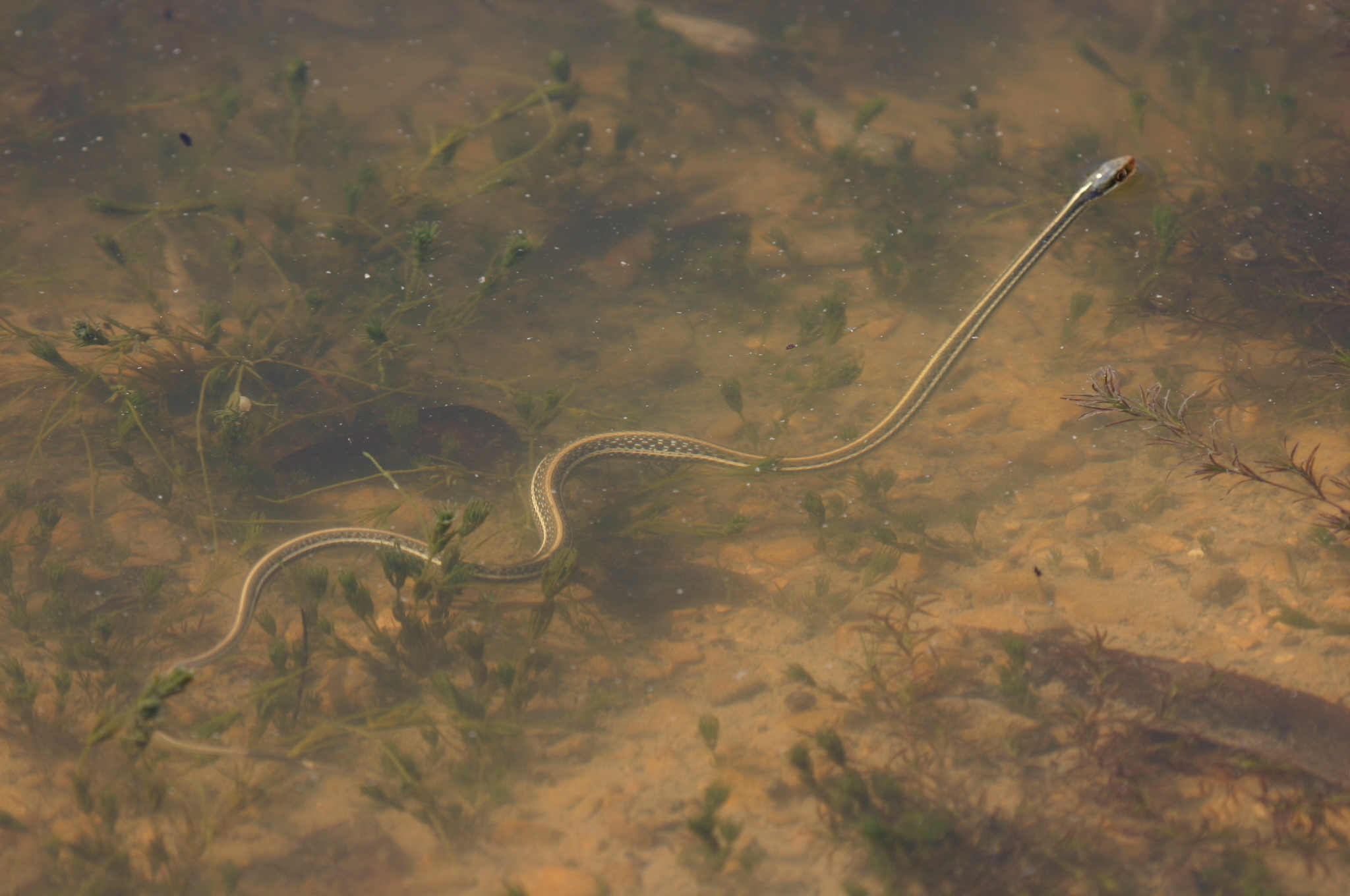
Arid Land Ribbonsnake swimming in canyon riverbed

== See also ==
- Museums in South Texas
- National Register of Historic Places listings in Val Verde County, Texas
