= Pandale, Texas =

- Ghost town

- Location within Texas
- Coordinates: 30°11′04″N 101°33′03″W
- Country: United States
- State: Texas
- County: Val Verde
- Elevation: 1,650 ft (500 m)
- Time zone: UTC-6 (Central (CST))
  - Summer (DST): UTC-5 (CDT)
- ZIP codes: 78840
- Area code: 830
- GNIS feature ID: 1378828

Pandale is a ghost town in Val Verde County, Texas, United States.

== Location and population ==
Pandale is located in Val Verde County at a Pecos River crossing, four miles south of the conjunction of Texas Ranch to Market Road 1024 and the Langtry-Pandale Road, at which point the Pandale Church stands. Pandale can be reached by traveling north from Langtry on the Langtry-Pandale County Road, an unpaved caliche county road. The hamlet is located at a bridge crossing on the Pecos River. The town can also be reached from Interstate 10 by traveling south on CR 405 and Texas Ranch to Market Road 2083, which becomes unpaved heading south at the Crockett/Val Verde County line, or taking RM 2083 southwest from Ozona on I-10.

The population in 2000 was 20. The permanent population has increased slightly due to ranch subdivisions and consists mainly of retirees. However, during the annual November to January deer hunting season, there is a large influx of hunters, the vast majority of whom own hunting leases on small tracts of private property, usually consisting of raised hunting blinds located in proximity to stocked, timed release corn and protein feeders.

== History ==
Prehistoric people lived in the area and left relics, such as arrowheads, one of which is called a "Pandale". The name of Pandale originates from its pan-like shape (pan) location in a valley (dale). The town began as a settlement where a crossing was established on the Pecos River. Around 1928, the town became a ranching community.

In 1945, Pandale had a store, a school, a teacherage, and a service station. The school building was sold to the Pandale Community Center, where the Sunday school, study club, and other organizations met. The last reported business at the community shut down in 1973, and the post office closed in 1977. There was once a school in the town but it closed when the school district was consolidated with the Comstock Independent School District in 1969. There is currently one small general store open part-time, and a cabin lodge near the Pecos River crossing, called Pandale Crossing River Resort. There is no longer a post office in the town.

Structures built in Pandale consist of a two-story stone house once owned by Henry James Young Mills, an out building that was formerly a garage and general store, also owned by the Mills family and a single room school house which was also used for Sunday school.

== Canoeing and kayaking ==
Pandale is a popular point to begin a canoe or kayak journey down a wild part of the Pecos River. The multiday expedition requires rigorous preparation, good physical conditioning, and experience dealing with whitewater. Do not attempt this trip alone.

== Education ==
It was formerly in the Pandale Common School District, but sometime prior to 1976 the Pandale district merged into the Comstock Independent School District. In 1964 Pandale's student count was 11.

The whole county is served by Southwest Texas Junior College according to the Texas Education Code.
