= Lake View, Texas =

Lake View
- census-designated place
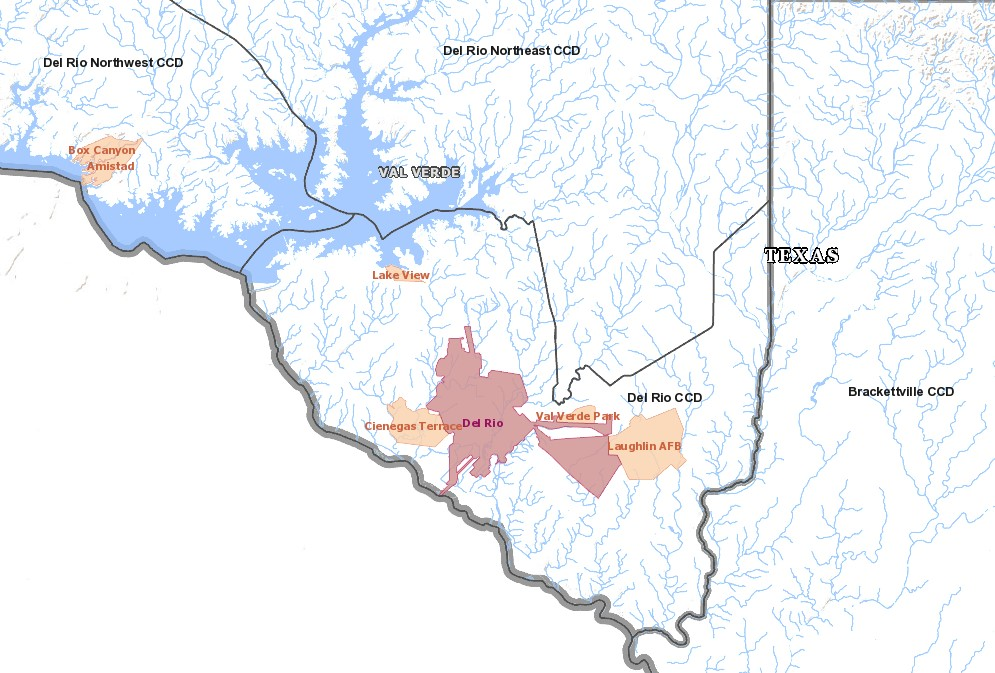

- Location within the state of Texas
- Coordinates: 29°27′33″N 100°57′12″W
- Country: United States
- State: Texas
- County: Val Verde

Area
  - Total: 0.50 sq mi (1.3 km^{2})
  - Land: 0.50 sq mi (1.3 km^{2})
- Elevation: 1,145 ft (349 m)

Population (2020)
  - Total: 197
  - Density: 390/sq mi (150/km^{2})
- Time zone: UTC-6 (Central (CST))
  - Summer (DST): UTC-5 (CDT)
- ZIP code: 78840
- GNIS feature ID: 2408554

Lake View is a census-designated place (CDP) in Val Verde County, Texas, United States. As of the 2020 census, Lake View had a population of 197.

== Geography ==
According to the United States Census Bureau, the CDP has a total area of 0.5 sq mi (1.3 km^{2}), all land.

== Demographics ==
Historical population
Census	Pop.	Note	%±
2010	199		—
2020	197		−1.0%
U.S. Decennial Census; 1850–1900 1910; 1920 1930 1940; 1950 1960 1970; 1980 1990 2000; 2010 2020

Lake View first appeared as a census designated place in the 2010 U.S. census.

=== 2020 census ===
Lake View CDP, Texas – Racial and ethnic composition Note: the US Census treats Hispanic/Latino as an ethnic category. This table excludes Latinos from the racial categories and assigns them to a separate category. Hispanics/Latinos may be of any race.
Race / Ethnicity (NH = Non-Hispanic)	Pop 2010	Pop 2020	% 2010	% 2020
White alone (NH)	120	106	60.30%	53.81%
Black or African American alone (NH)	0	0	0.00%	0.00%
Native American or Alaska Native alone (NH)	2	0	1.01%	0.00%
Asian alone (NH)	0	0	0.00%	0.00%
Native Hawaiian or Pacific Islander alone (NH)	0	0	0.00%	0.00%
Other race alone (NH)	0	0	0.00%	0.00%
Mixed race or Multiracial (NH)	0	6	0.00%	3.05%
Hispanic or Latino (any race)	77	85	38.69%	43.15%
Total	199	197	100.00%	100.00%

As of the 2020 United States census, there were 197 people, 39 households, and 39 families residing in the CDP.

=== 2000 census ===
As of the census of 2000, 167 people, 79 households, and 48 families were residing in the CDP. The population density was 331.0 people /sq mi (129.0/km^{2}). The 123 housing units averaged 243.8/sq mi (95.0/km^{2}). The racial makeup of the CDP was 92.22% White, 1.20% African American, 1.20% Native American, 1.20% Asian, 4.19% from other races. Hispanics of any race were 19.16% of the population.

Of the 79 households, 19.0% had children under 18 living with them, 53.2% were married couples, 2.5% had a female householder with no husband present, and 39.2% were not families. About 34.2% of all households were made up of individuals, and 13.9% had someone living alone who was 65 or older. The average household size was 2.11, and the average family size was 2.71.

In the CDP, the age distribution was 18.0% under 18, 4.2% from 18 to 24, 22.2% from 25 to 44, 29.3% from 45 to 64, and 26.3% who were 65 or older. The median age was 47 years. For every 100 females, there were 98.8 males. For every 100 females age 18 and over, there were 98.6 males.

The median income for a household in the CDP was $33,875, and for a family was $38,333. Males had a median income of $14,479 versus $25,625 for females. The per capita income for the CDP was $19,469. None of the families and 21.9% of the population were living below the poverty line, including none under 18 and 18.5% over 64.

== Education ==
Lake View is served by the San Felipe Del Rio Consolidated Independent School District.

The whole county is served by Southwest Texas Junior College according to the Texas Education Code.
