= Juno, Texas =

- Unincorporated Community

- Location within Texas
- Coordinates: 30°09′07″N 101°06′55″W
- Country: United States
- State: Texas
- County: Val Verde
- Elevation: 1,706 ft (520 m)
- Time zone: UTC-6 (Central (CST))
  - Summer (DST): UTC-5 (CDT)
- ZIP codes: 78840
- Area code: 432
- GNIS feature ID: 1378509

Juno is a ghost town in Val Verde County, Texas, United States, in the southwestern part of the state. Its last business closed in 1984, and the only remnant of Juno now is a lone ranch. What remains of the village was, by 2013, situated on private ranch land.

== Population and location ==
In 2000, the town had a population of 10. The town was located at Latitude: 30.15167 : Longitude: -101.115 in Val Verde County, a county bordering Mexico. The town is 48 miles north-northwest of Del Rio.

== History ==
=== Origin of the town’s name ===
According to legend, a restaurant in the town operated by Henry Stein served only frijoles (beans). When asked what was on the menu, the reply would be “you know”, which sounded like “Juno”. This became the town's official name when it was approved from the application for a post office filed in the late 1880s.

=== Timeline of the town ===
Source:adapted from

- 1849: troops were stationed at nearby Beaver Lake, to protect travelers from Indians.
- 1880s: the community established itself as a ranching supply center and the post office opened.
- 1899: fifty lots were laid out.
- 1901: the town had segregated schools (in the same building) with a combined enrollment of over 115 students (two teachers, 88 white students, 29 black students). A hotel was opened and the town was served by a stage line.
- 1975: Post office closed
- 1984: the last business in Juno closed

=== Other historical facts ===
The Edmondson family built the original general store. Henry Stein operated a cafe that gave the town its name of Juno as the answer of “Ju know” (“you know”) was given as the answer when patrons inquired about the menu offerings. A hotel and a land office were opened in the first quarter of the 20th century. The community had telephone and stage service. The Cadena family ran the blacksmith shop, and George Deaton drove the stage. At its peak in 1964, the town had a population of 80. The town had one business for most years starting in 1931 until the last business closed in 1984.

== Education ==
The Juno Common School District, a one room school house, operated until 1992, when it consolidated into the Comstock Independent School District. The entire county is served by Southwest Texas Junior College according to the Texas Education Code.
