= Comstock, Texas =

- Unincorporated community
- Location within Texas
- Coordinates: 29°41′04″N 101°10′24″W
- Country: United States
- State: Texas
- County: Val Verde
- Elevation: 1,549 ft (472 m)
- Time zone: UTC-6 (Central (CST))
  - Summer (DST): UTC-5 (CDT)
- ZIP Code: 78837
- Area code: 432
- GNIS feature ID: 1333194

Comstock is an unincorporated community located in Val Verde County, Texas, United States, approximately 20 miles northwest of Del Rio on U.S. 90. It is the town nearest to Seminole Canyon, which has been a site of human habitation for 9,000 years. In 2010, Comstock had a population of 475 residents.

== History ==
Comstock was founded circa 1883 on the Galveston, Harrisburg and San Antonio Railway as the line drove west toward El Paso. Although first platted as Sotol City, it was later named for John Comstock, a railroad dispatcher.

The town was located near a natural lake, which was used for the town's water supply, but which today is only intermittent. The town was granted a post office in 1888, but its remote location and limited resources kept the town from growing quickly. Comstock was at the height of its activity between 1888 and 1910, when the Deaton Stage Line operated between the town's railroad depot and the city of Ozona, some 60 mi (100 km) north. The depot at Comstock did not long outlast the stagecoach line, and although the names on the businesses have changed, little has changed in the town in 70 years.

Amtrak’s Sunset Limited passes through the town on Union Pacific tracks, but makes no stop. A stop is located 30 miles to the south in Del Rio.

== Seminole Canyon State Park and Historic Site ==
Seminole Canyon State Park and Historic Site has cave drawings and other evidence of settlement dating from the early Archaic period, around 7000 BC. Later remains include stone circles and cairns of the late Prehistoric, and even 19th-century remains from the construction of the Southern Pacific, one of the nation's first transcontinental railroads.

== Education ==
Comstock is served by the Comstock Independent School District.

The whole county is served by Southwest Texas Junior College according to the Texas Education Code.
