= San Felipe-Del Rio Consolidated Independent School District =

School district in Texas

San Felipe-Del Rio Consolidated Independent School District (SFDR-CISD) is a school district based in Del Rio, Texas (USA).

The school district serves all of the city of Del Rio and some unincorporated portions of Val Verde County, including Cienegas Terrace, Lake View, and Val Verde Park, as well as Laughlin Air Force Base. Dependent children who are residents of the base are zoned to SFDR-CISD schools.

In 2009, the superintendent took measures to crack down on students from Mexico who were illegally attending district schools. Before the crackdown, many residents of Ciudad Acuña used false addresses to attend SFDR-CISD schools.

In 2009, the school district was rated "academically acceptable" by the Texas Education Agency.

== Schools ==
=== Secondary schools ===
==== High schools ====
- Del Rio Freshman School (9)
- Del Rio High School (10-12)
- Early College High School (9-12)
- Blended Academy (8-12)

==== Middle schools ====
- Del Rio Middle School (6-8)
- San Felipe Memorial Middle School (6)
- Garfield Middle School (6-8)

=== Primary schools ===
- Roberto Barrera STEM Elementary School (K-5) campus is in Laughlin AFB
- Buena Vista Elementary (K-5)
- Dr. Fermin Calderon Elementary (K-5)
- Irene C. Cardwell Elementary (Pre-K)
- Ruben Chavira Elementary School (K-5)
- Dr. Lonnie Green Elementary (K-5)
- Lamar Elementary (K-5)
- North Heights Elementary (K-5)
- Ceniza Hills Elementary School (K-5)

== See also ==
- List of school districts in Texas
