= Seminole Canyon =

Seminole Canyon, a valley and a stream in Val Verde County, Texas. Its mouth lies at an elevation of 1119 feet (341). The head of the canyon is at 29°44′47″N 101°16′07″W, west of the Southern Pacific Railroad line. The Seminole Canyon Creek has its source to the east of the rail line, on a mountainside 29°44′58″N 101°14′27″W at an elevation of 1740 feet and flows through Seminole Canyon State Park and Historic Site.
