= Amistad National Recreation Area =

Protected area in Val Verde County, Texas

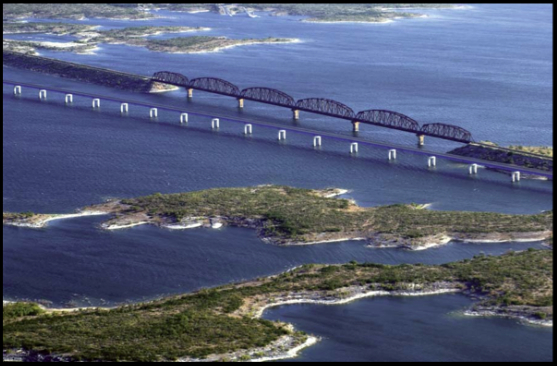
- Southern Pacific Railroad Bridge over Amistad Reservoir

- Location within Texas Location within the United States
- Location: Val Verde County, Texas, USA
- Nearest city: Del Rio, Texas
- Coordinates: 29°26′12″N 101°3′0″W
- Area: 58,500 acres (237 km^{2})
- Established: November 11, 1965
- Visitors: 912,283 (in 2022)
- Governing body: National Park Service
- Website: Amistad National Recreation Area

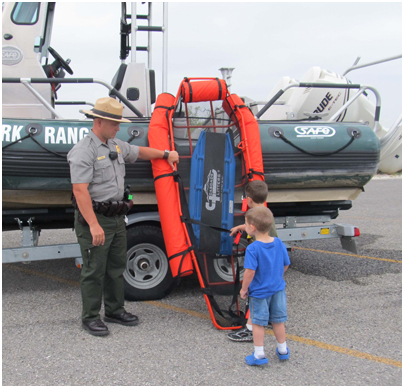
A law enforcement park ranger on National Junior Ranger Day at Amistad National Recreation Area's Diablo East Marina instructing young visitors about boating safety

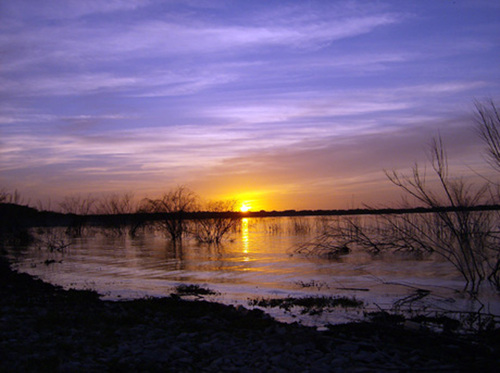
Amistad Reservoir at sunset

Amistad National Recreation Area is a national recreation area managed by National Park Service (NPS) that includes the area around the Amistad Reservoir at the confluence of the Rio Grande, the Devils River, and the Pecos River near Del Rio in Val Verde County, Texas. The reservoir was created by the Amistad Dam (Presa de la Amistad in Spanish), completed in 1969, located on the Rio Grande at the United States-Mexico border across from the city of Ciudad Acuña in the Mexican state of Coahuila. Amistad, Spanish for "friendship," refers broadly to the close relationship and shared history between Ciudad Acuña and Del Rio.

== Recreational activities ==
The lake given its location is the backdrop for year-round, water-based recreation opportunities, including boating, fishing, swimming, scuba diving and water-skiing. Amistad National Recreation Area in addition provides opportunities for picnicking, hiking, camping and hunting. The area is rich in archeology and rock art and contains a wide variety of plant and animal life. In the fall, monarch butterflies by the thousands pass through the area during their 3,000 mile (4,800 km) migration from southern Canada to central Mexico.

There are opportunities for hunting as provided for under state and federal law at Amistad given its status as a recreation area. Bow-hunting for white-tailed deer, javelina, turkey, rabbit, mouflon sheep, aoudad sheep, blackbuck antelope, and feral hog is permitted during certain times of the year in prescribed hunt areas. Though rifles and handguns are not permitted, shotguns may be used to hunt dove, quail, duck, and rabbit in accordance with State and park regulations.

Elite scuba divers have begun to explore the system of deep underwater caves beneath the surface of the reservoir. The dive requires exotic gas mixes, pre-placement of gas cylinders, and extensive decompression times at depth. These caves are considered hazardous and should not be attempted by anyone without extensive training and preparation.

== Administrative history ==
The National Park Service initially managed the site as the Amistad Recreation Area under a cooperative agreement with the International Boundary and Water Commission effective November 11, 1965. Amistad was reauthorized as a national recreation area and NPS park unit on November 28, 1990.

== Gallery ==
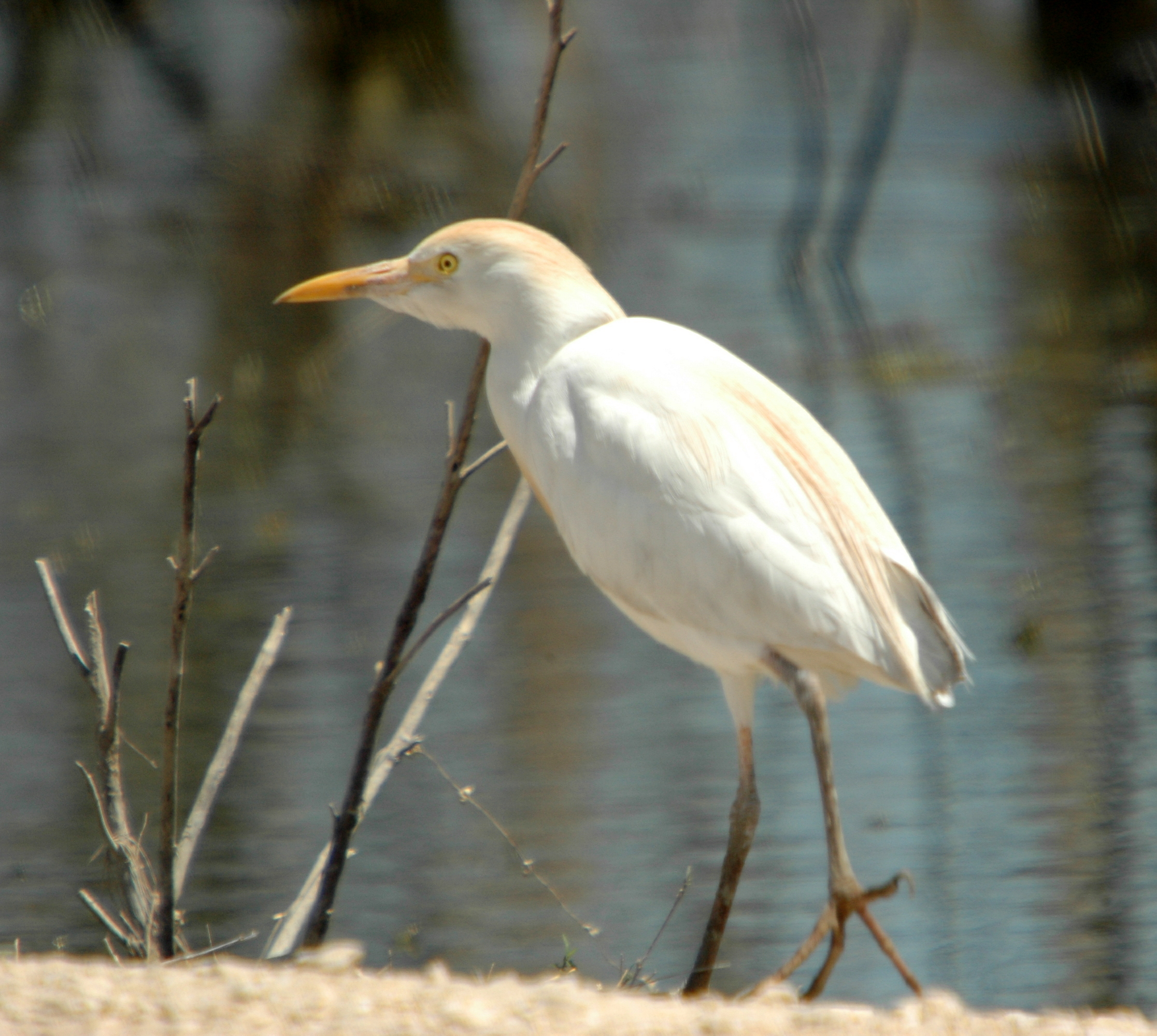
Cattle egret (Bubulcus ibis) near the reservoir

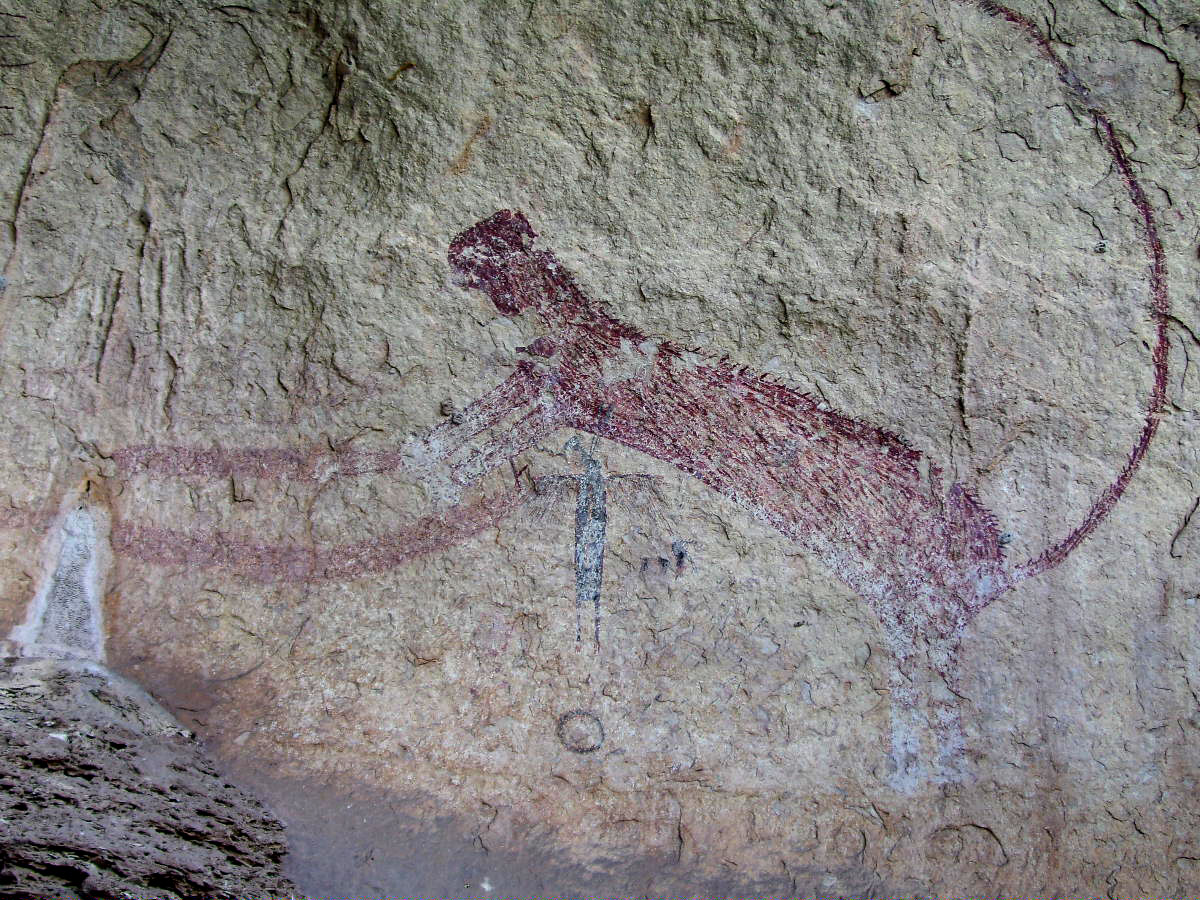
Panther petroglyph located in Panther Cave jointly managed with Seminole Canyon State Park and Historic Site

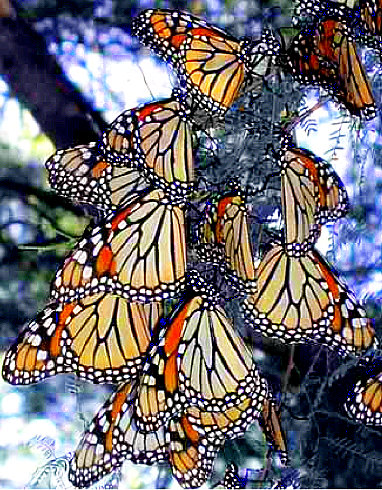
Monarch butterflies (Danaus plexippus) roosting in the fall on their migration south to Mexico
