= Val Verde County, Texas =

County in Texas, United States

- County
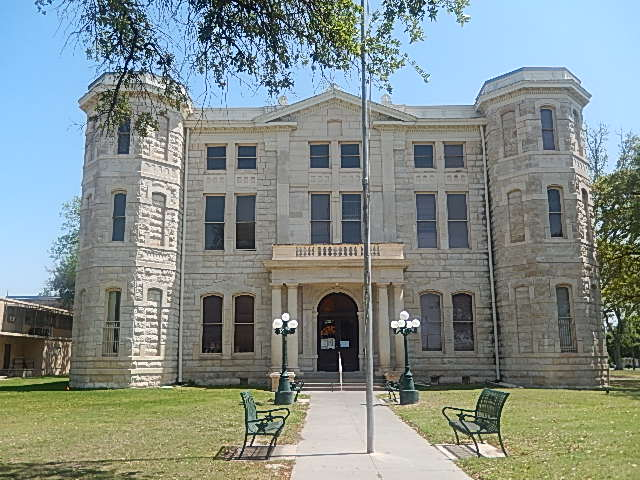
- County courthouse

- Location within the U.S. state of Texas
- Coordinates: 29°53′N 101°09′W
- Country: United States
- State: Texas
- Founded: 1885
- Named for: Battle of Valverde
- Seat: Del Rio
- Largest city: Del Rio

Area
  - Total: 3,233 sq mi (8,370 km^{2})
  - Land: 3,145 sq mi (8,150 km^{2})
  - Water: 88 sq mi (230 km^{2}) 2.7%

Population (2020)
  - Total: 47,586
  - Estimate (2025): 47,835 ▲
  - Density: 15.13/sq mi (5.842/km^{2})
- Time zone: UTC−6 (Central)
  - Summer (DST): UTC−5 (CDT)
- Congressional district: 23rd
- Website: www.valverdecounty.texas.gov

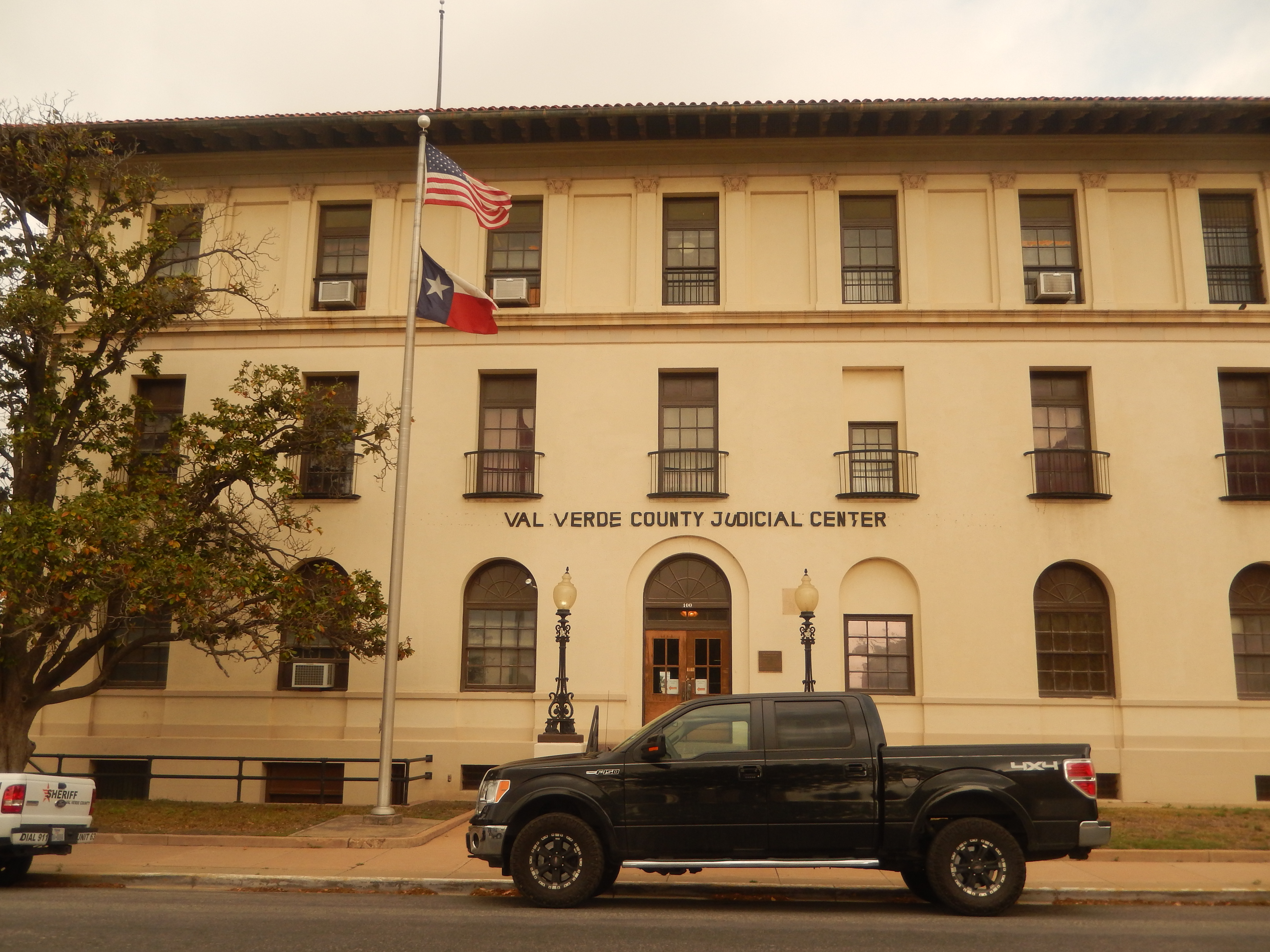
Val Verde County Judicial Center at 100 E. Broadway St. in Del Rio

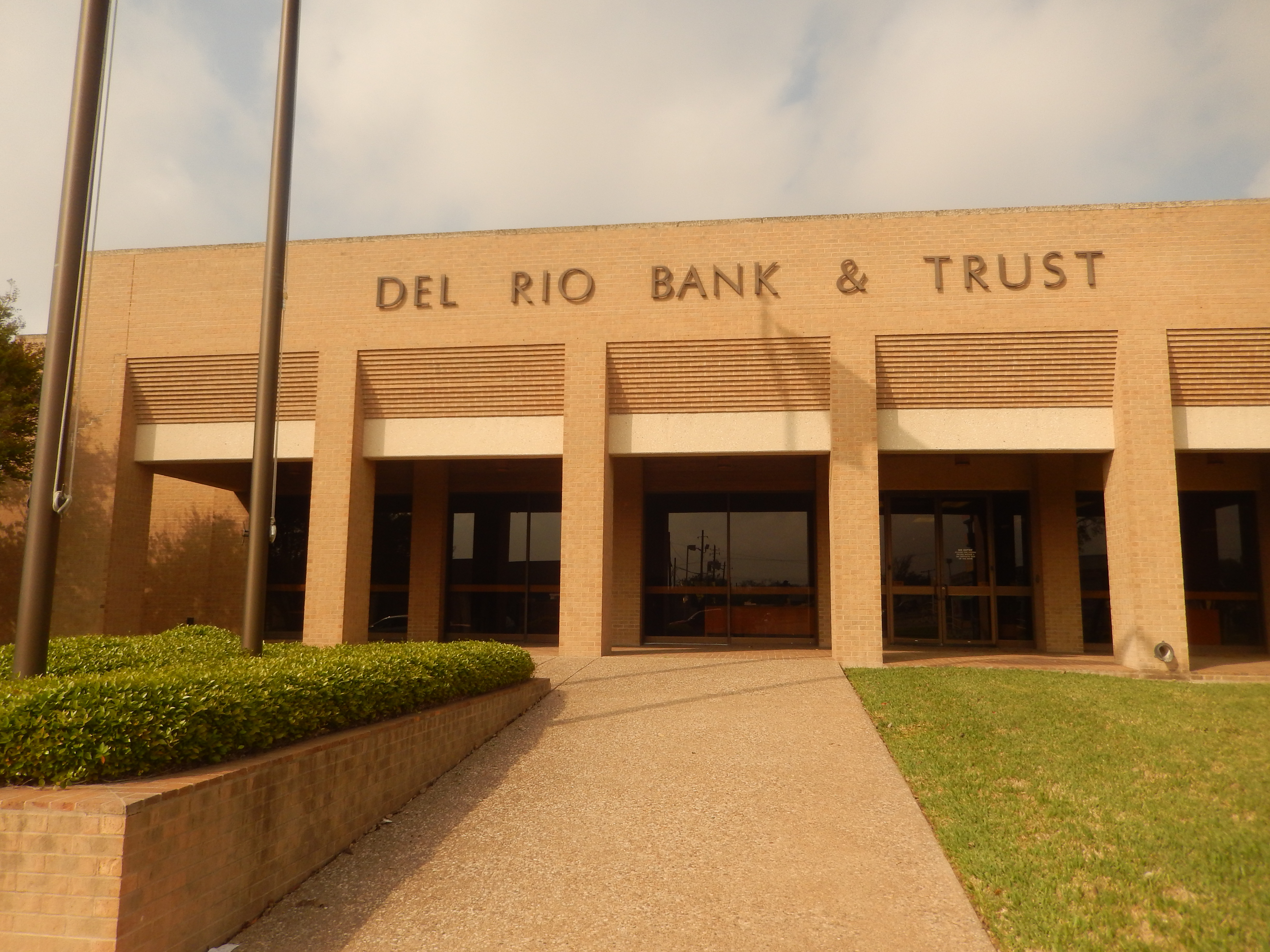
Del Rio Bank and Trust Company was organized in 1910. The bank is hence a year older than the Del Rio city government and has served Val Verde County for more than a century. The photo is the facility at 1200 Veterans Blvd.; another location is 22411 N Bedell Ave.

Val Verde County is a county located on the southern Edwards Plateau in the U.S. state of Texas. Its 2020 population was 47,586. Its county seat is Del Rio. The Del Rio micropolitan statistical area includes all of Val Verde County.

Val Verde, which means "green valley", was named for a battle of the Civil War. In 1862, soldiers of Sibley's Brigade took part in the Texas invasion of New Mexico Territory, where they captured several artillery pieces at the Battle of Val Verde. The battle is memorialized both in the name of the county and a small settlement in Milam County.

== History ==
=== Early history ===
The first inhabitants of what is now known as Val Verde County lived there some 6,000–10,000 years ago. Their descendants include such Native American peoples as the Lipan Apache, Coahuiltecan, Jumano, Tamaulipan and Comanche.

=== Colonial rule ===
In 1590, Spanish explorer Gaspar Castaño de Sosa led a mining expedition of 170 who passed through Devils Draw. He referred to a stream by the name of Laxas, which is believed to be Devils River.

In 1673, Juan Larios opened a mission school at a location between Del Rio and Eagle Pass.

In 1675, traveling Franciscan priests celebrated Mass at San Felipe Springs.

In 1736, Lt. Miguel de la Garza Falcón led 100 soldiers along the Devils River in pursuit of Apache natives.

During 1834, James Grant and John Charles Beales established a settlement on San Felipe Creek, which became hazardous due to Indian attacks.

=== Aftermath of Mexican–American War ===
During the 1850s, military bases established to protect against Indian attacks included Camp Blake, Camp Hudson and Camp San Felipe.

As of 1860, the county had a population of 2,874, including 108 blacks and 1,103 foreign-born.

=== Post–Civil War ===
During 1868, the San Felipe Del Rio community is established on San Felipe Creek, next to Camp San Felipe.

From 1869 through 1882, Seminole Negro Indian Scouts (mixed heritage Seminoles with African blood) under John Lapham Bullis, namesake of Camp Bullis, defend the Texas border against Indian attacks.

In 1883, the Galveston Harrisburg and San Antonio Railway was completed. Italian immigrant Frank Qualia established Val Verde winery.

In 1884, the Langtry community was established, named after George Langtry (an engineer and foreman). It mistakenly had been attributed to being named after British entertainer Lillie Langtry by Judge Roy Bean.

In 1885, Val Verde County was organized from Crockett, Kinney, and Pecos Counties. Roy Bean was elected justice of the peace in Langtry, operating out of the Jersey Lily Saloon and becoming renowned as "the Law West of the Pecos".

In 1886, the Juno and Devils River communities were established.

In 1888, the Comstock community was established.

In 1889, the community of Norris was established.

By 1890, the last Indian raids had happened and were no longer considered a threat.

=== 20th century ===
- 1928 Lake Hamilton Dam complete.
- 1904 Lillie Langtry visits the community of Langtry.
- 1929 Lake Walk Dam complete.
- 1936 Val Verde County received Recorded Texas Historic Landmark number 5625 to commemorate its founding.
- 1942 Laughlin Field/Laughlin Army Air Field opens to train World War II pilots.
- 1945 Laughlin Field closes.
- 1952 Laughlin Field reopens as Laughlin Air Force Base, and serves as a secret U2 unit. Major Rudolf Anderson, a U-2 pilot based out of Laughlin, was the only casualty of the Cuban Missile Crisis.
- 1969 Amistad Dam and Reservoir complete. The project cost $78 million.

== Geography ==
According to the U.S. Census Bureau, the county has a total area of 3,233 sq mi (8,370 km^{2}), of which 3,145 sq mi (8,150 km^{2}) are land and 88 sq mi (230 km^{2}) (2.7%) are covered by water.

=== Major highways ===
- U.S. Highway 90
- U.S. Highway 277
  - includes U.S. 277 Spur route
- U.S. Highway 377
- State Highway 163
- Loop 25
- Loop 79
- Spur 239
- Spur 297
- Spur 317
- Spur 349
- Spur 406
- Spur 454

=== Adjacent counties and municipios ===
- Crockett County (north)
- Sutton County (northeast)
- Edwards County (east)
- Kinney County (east)
- Terrell County (west)
- Acuña, Coahuila, Mexico (south)
- Jiménez, Coahuila, Mexico (south)

=== National protected areas ===
- Amistad National Recreation Area
- Rio Grande Wild and Scenic River (part)

== Demographics ==
Historical population
Census	Pop.	Note	%±
1890	2,874		—
1900	5,263		83.1%
1910	8,613		63.7%
1920	12,706		47.5%
1930	14,924		17.5%
1940	15,453		3.5%
1950	16,635		7.6%
1960	24,461		47.0%
1970	27,471		12.3%
1980	35,910		30.7%
1990	38,721		7.8%
2000	44,856		15.8%
2010	48,879		9.0%
2020	47,586		−2.6%
2025 (est.)	47,835	▲	0.5%
U.S. Decennial Census; 1850–2010 2010 2020

=== 2020 census ===
As of the 2020 census, the county had a population of 47,586. The median age was 34.5 years. 26.5% of residents were under the age of 18 and 15.5% of residents were 65 years of age or older. For every 100 females there were 99.7 males, and for every 100 females age 18 and over there were 98.9 males age 18 and over.

The racial makeup of the county was 44.6% White, 1.4% Black or African American, 0.7% American Indian and Alaska Native, 0.8% Asian, 0.1% Native Hawaiian and Pacific Islander, 17.5% from some other race, and 34.9% from two or more races. Hispanic or Latino residents of any race comprised 80.3% of the population.

89.7% of residents lived in urban areas, while 10.3% lived in rural areas.

There were 15,796 households in the county, of which 38.7% had children under the age of 18 living in them. Of all households, 50.9% were married-couple households, 17.0% were households with a male householder and no spouse or partner present, and 27.6% were households with a female householder and no spouse or partner present. About 22.3% of all households were made up of individuals and 10.7% had someone living alone who was 65 years of age or older.

There were 18,455 housing units, of which 14.4% were vacant. Among occupied housing units, 64.9% were owner-occupied and 35.1% were renter-occupied. The homeowner vacancy rate was 1.4% and the rental vacancy rate was 9.6%.

=== Racial and ethnic composition ===
Val Verde County, Texas – Racial and ethnic composition Note: the US Census treats Hispanic/Latino as an ethnic category. This table excludes Latinos from the racial categories and assigns them to a separate category. Hispanics/Latinos may be of any race.
Race / Ethnicity (NH = Non-Hispanic)	Pop 1980	Pop 1990	Pop 2000	Pop 2010	Pop 2020	% 1980	% 1990	% 2000	% 2010	% 2020
White alone (NH)	12,237	10,418	9,734	8,548	7,836	34.08%	26.91%	21.70%	17.49%	16.47%
Black or African American alone (NH)	709	680	609	563	538	1.97%	1.76%	1.36%	1.15%	1.13%
Native American or Alaska Native alone (NH)	65	61	129	86	57	0.18%	0.16%	0.29%	0.18%	0.12%
Asian alone (NH)	159	219	235	207	351	0.44%	0.57%	0.52%	0.42%	0.74%
Native Hawaiian or Pacific Islander alone (NH)	x	x	12	37	35	x	x	0.03%	0.08%	0.07%
Other race alone (NH)	139	44	29	29	85	0.39%	0.11%	0.06%	0.06%	0.18%
Mixed race or Multiracial (NH)	x	x	259	210	477	x	x	0.58%	0.43%	1.00%
Hispanic or Latino (any race)	22,601	27,299	33,849	39,199	38,207	62.94%	70.50%	75.46%	80.20%	80.29%
Total	35,910	38,721	44,856	48,879	47,586	100.00%	100.00%	100.00%	100.00%	100.00%

=== 2000 census ===
As of the 2000 census, 44,856 people, 14,151 households, and 11,320 families resided in the county. The population density was 14 people per square mile (5.4 people/km^{2}). The 16,288 housing units averaged 5 units per square mile (1.9 units/km^{2}). The racial makeup of the county was 76.36% White, 4.54% African American, 0.68% Native American, 0.55% Asian, 0.05% Pacific Islander, 18.22% from other races, and 2.60% from two or more races. About 75.5% of the population was Hispanic or Latino of any race.

Of the 14,151 households, 42.90% had children under the age of 18 living with them, 62.50% were married couples living together, 13.90% had a female householder with no husband present, and 20.00% were not families. About 17.50% of all households were made up of individuals, and 7.50% had someone living alone who was 65 years of age or older. The average household size was 3.11 and the average family size was 3.55.

In the county, the population was distributed as 32.10% under the age of 18, 9.40% from 18 to 24, 27.90% from 25 to 44, 19.60% from 45 to 64, and 11.00% who were 65 years of age or older. The median age was 31 years. For every 100 females, there were 97.00 males. For every 100 females age 18 and over, there were 93.20 males.

The median income for a household in the county was $28,376, and for a family was $31,434. Males had a median income of $26,485 versus $18,039 for females. The per capita income for the county was $12,096. About 22.10% of families and 26.10% of the population were below the poverty line, including 33.80% of those under age 18 and 26.40% of them age 65 or over.

== Education ==
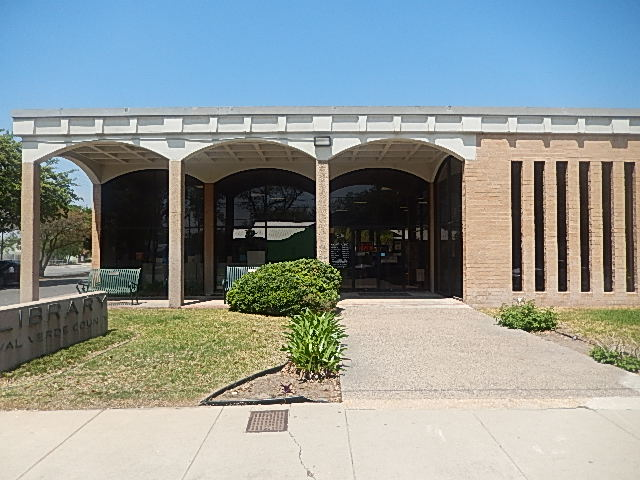
The Val Verde County Library is located at 300 Spring St. in Del Rio.

School districts include:

- Comstock Independent School District
- Rocksprings Independent School District
- San Felipe-Del Rio Consolidated Independent School District

Sometime prior to 1976 the Comstock district absorbed the Langtry and Pandale common school districts. The former Juno Common School District consolidated into Comstock ISD in 1992. There was formerly a Star Route School on Miers Ranch. In 1964 the school had 13 students.

Southwest Texas Junior College is the designated community college for the county.

The Val Verde County Library in Del Rio serves the county.

== Government ==
Val Verde County government is led by a four-member board of county commissioners, each commissioner representing one of four districts. The county commission appoints a county administrator as chief administrative officer of the county. The chief law-enforcement authority of Val Verde is the Val Verde County Sheriff's Office. Val Verde County Sheriff’s Office. The fire-protection arm of the Val Verde is the Val Verde County Fire Rescue. Val Verde County Fire Rescue.

=== County commissioners ===
One county commissioner is elected from each district to serve a 4-year term. Commissioners are chosen in partisan elections by voters from the districts in which they live. The board appoints a county judge to be chief administrative officer of the county, responsible to the commission for the orderly operations of matters within the board's jurisdiction. The current office holders are:

- Val Verde County Judge: Honorable Judge Lewis Owens
- Val Verde County Precinct 1: Kerr McEntire Wardlaw
- Val Verde County Precinct 2: Juan Vazquez
- Val Verde County Precinct 3: Fernando Garcia
- Val Verde County Precinct 4: Gustavo Flores

=== Politics ===
Val Verde County has been a longtime swing county, having voted for both Republicans and Democrats throughout its history. From 1924 to 2012, it was also a presidential bellwether county, voting for the losing candidate only once in 1968. Then, in 2016 and 2020, Val Verde voted for the losing candidate twice in a row, although Hillary Clinton did win the popular vote in 2016. The county then voted for the winning candidate again in 2024, with Donald Trump prevailing by the strongest margin for a Republican since 1972.

United States presidential election results for Val Verde County, Texas
Year	Republican		Democratic		Third party(ies)	
Year	No.	%	No.	%	No.	%
1912	196	30.06%	298	45.71%	158	24.23%
1916	135	22.96%	446	75.85%	7	1.19%
1920	296	41.23%	418	58.22%	4	0.56%
1924	457	45.79%	434	43.49%	107	10.72%
1928	854	57.94%	620	42.06%	0	0.00%
1932	421	22.94%	1,412	76.95%	2	0.11%
1936	504	28.46%	1,262	71.26%	5	0.28%
1940	616	27.41%	1,628	72.45%	3	0.13%
1944	676	34.06%	1,210	60.96%	99	4.99%
1948	672	33.97%	1,242	62.79%	64	3.24%
1952	1,725	51.14%	1,647	48.83%	1	0.03%
1956	1,660	50.81%	1,598	48.91%	9	0.28%
1960	1,551	43.05%	2,049	56.87%	3	0.08%
1964	1,346	27.46%	3,555	72.52%	1	0.02%
1968	1,914	33.59%	3,205	56.25%	579	10.16%
1972	4,052	66.17%	2,049	33.46%	23	0.38%
1976	3,476	42.64%	4,603	56.46%	73	0.90%
1980	5,055	54.05%	4,116	44.01%	182	1.95%
1984	5,909	60.38%	3,857	39.41%	21	0.21%
1988	5,109	50.03%	5,044	49.40%	58	0.57%
1992	4,102	37.30%	4,748	43.18%	2,146	19.52%
1996	4,357	41.10%	5,623	53.05%	620	5.85%
2000	6,223	54.24%	5,056	44.06%	195	1.70%
2004	6,968	59.08%	4,757	40.33%	70	0.59%
2008	5,752	44.87%	6,982	54.46%	86	0.67%
2012	5,635	46.64%	6,285	52.02%	161	1.33%
2016	5,890	43.25%	6,964	51.14%	763	5.60%
2020	8,284	54.21%	6,771	44.31%	225	1.47%
2024	9,162	62.81%	5,282	36.21%	144	0.99%

United States Senate election results for Val Verde County, Texas1
Year	Republican		Democratic		Third party(ies)	
Year	No.	%	No.	%	No.	%
2024	8,071	56.47%	5,782	40.45%	440	3.08%

United States Senate election results for Val Verde County, Texas2
Year	Republican		Democratic		Third party(ies)	
Year	No.	%	No.	%	No.	%
2020	8,103	54.14%	6,430	42.96%	435	2.91%

Texas Gubernatorial election results for Val Verde County
Year	Republican		Democratic		Third party(ies)	
Year	No.	%	No.	%	No.	%
2022	5,530	58.16%	3,814	40.11%	165	1.74%

== Communities ==
=== City ===
- Del Rio (county seat)

=== Census-designated places ===
- Amistad
- Box Canyon
- Cienegas Terrace
- Lake View
- Laughlin Air Force Base
- Val Verde Park

=== Former census-designated places ===
- Box Canyon-Amistad

=== Unincorporated communities ===
- Comstock
- Juno
- Langtry
- Pandale

=== Ghost town ===
- Pumpville

== Notable people ==
- Judge Roy Bean

== See also ==
- List of museums in Central Texas
- List of museums in West Texas
- National Register of Historic Places listings in Val Verde County, Texas
- Recorded Texas Historic Landmarks in Val Verde County
