= Juno Common School District =

School district in Texas, United States

Juno Common School District No. 4 was a school district formerly based in Juno, Texas.

It was a one room schoolhouse.

== History ==
A building with segregated schools for black students and white students - with 29 and 88 students, respectively, was active in the town in 1901. The school for black students was on a part time basis.

In 1964 the student enrollment was 18.

Circa 1976 the student body was typically around 7-13. By 1976 it was the only common school district remaining in Val Verde County. At the time some students took school buses and some students used other means of transportation if they came from isolated areas.

In 1980 there were a total of four students. The sole teacher used the World Book Encyclopedia in her instruction.

It operated until 1992, when it had an enrollment of eight, with two of the pupils being the children of the teacher. That year it consolidated into the Comstock Independent School District. Both Juno CSD and Comstock ISD asked for a consolidation, which all four members of the Val Verde County Commissioner's Court granted.

== See also ==
- Divide Independent School District - Commonly described as a one room schoolhouse
- Allamoore Independent School District - Former one room schoolhouse
