= Comstock Independent School District =

School district in Texas

Address
- 101 Sanderson Street Comstock, Texas, 78837; United States

District information
- Grades: K–12
- Established: 1910; 116 years ago

Students and staff
- Enrollment: 194 (2015-2016)
- District mascot: Panthers
- Colors: Green and White

Other information
- Website: www.comstockisd.net

Comstock Independent School District is a public school district based in the community of Comstock, Texas, United States. The district consists of a single K-12 school located in Comstock.

In addition to Comstock, the district also serves the census designated places of Amistad and Box Canyon, as well as the unincorporated areas of Juno, Langtry, and Pandale.

In 2007, the Texas State Energy Conservation Office awards Comstock ISD money due to the colonias served by the district.

In 2009, the school district was rated "recognized" by the Texas Education Agency.

== History ==
Prior to 1976, Comstock ISD absorbed the Langtry Common School District and the Pandale Common School District.

On July 1, 1992, the Juno Common School District merged into Comstock ISD.

== Controversy ==
In July 2024, the ACLU of Texas sent Comstock ISD a letter, alleging that the district's 2023-2024 dress and grooming code appeared to violate the Creating a Respectful and Open World for Natural Hair (or CROWN) Act, a Texas law which prohibits racial discrimination based on hair texture or style, and asking the district to revise its policies for the 2024-2025 school year.
