= Southwest Texas Junior College =

Community college in Uvalde, Texas, U.S.

Southwest Texas College
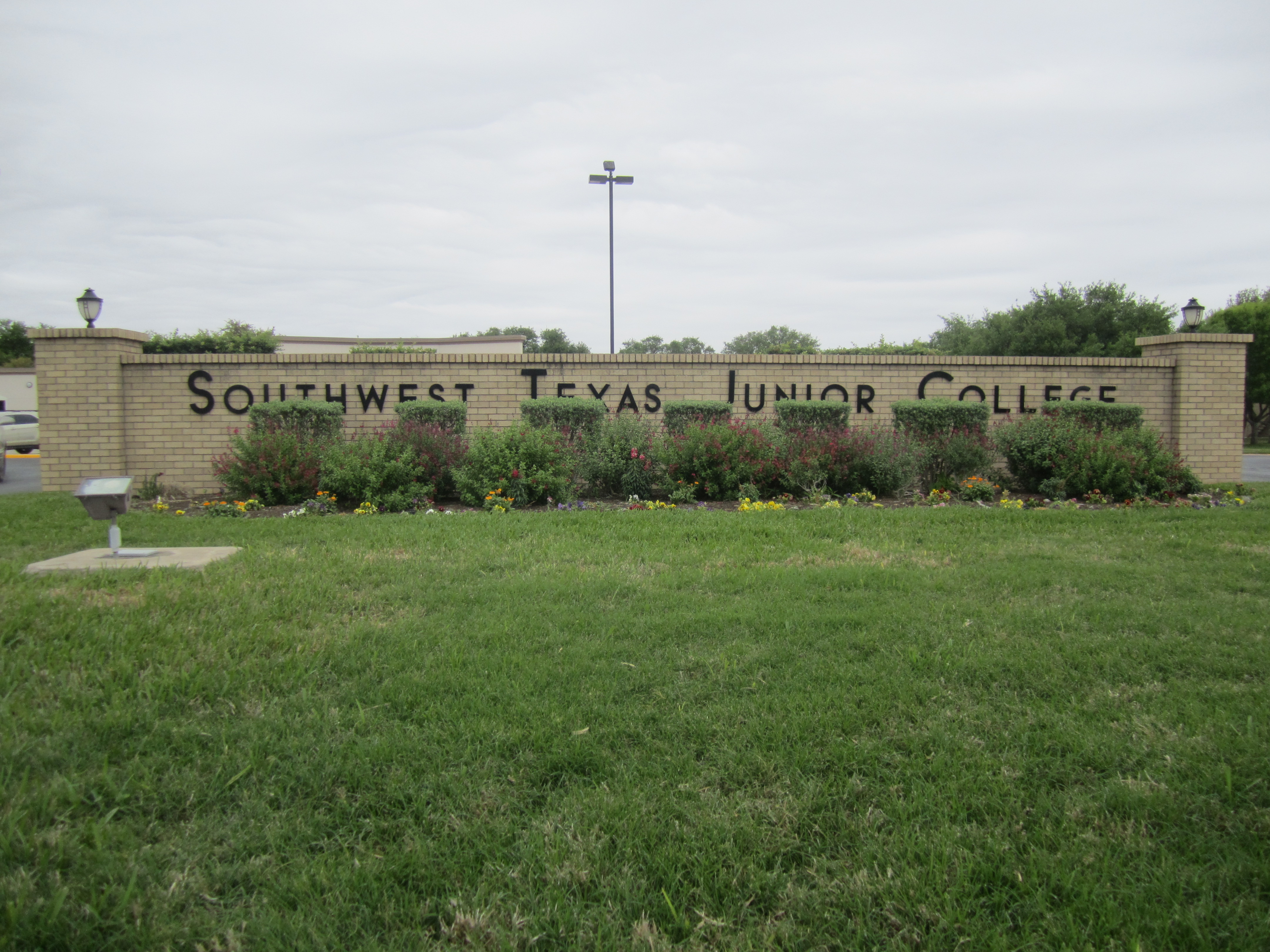
- Entrance to main campus
- Type: Public community college
- Established: 1946
- Affiliations: SACS
- President: Hector Gonzales
- Faculty: 180
- Administrative staff: 328
- Students: 5,664
- Location: Uvalde, Texas, United States
- Campus: Five commuter campuses
- Nickname: Cowboys
- Website: www.swtxc.edu

Southwest Texas College, formerly Southwest Texas Junior College (SWTJC), is a public community college with four campuses serving 11 counties in southwest Texas: unincorporated Uvalde County (next to Uvalde and on the site of Garner Field), Del Rio (northwest portion), next to Del Rio International Airport, unincorporated Maverick County (near Eagle Pass), and Crystal City, the seat of Zavala County.

Its service area, according to the Texas Education Code, in addition to Uvalde, Val Verde, Maverick, and Zavala Counties, includes Dimmit, Edwards, Frio, Kinney, La Salle, Medina, and Real.

== Notable alumni ==
- Tracy King, member of the Texas House of Representatives from District 80

== Uvalde campus gallery ==
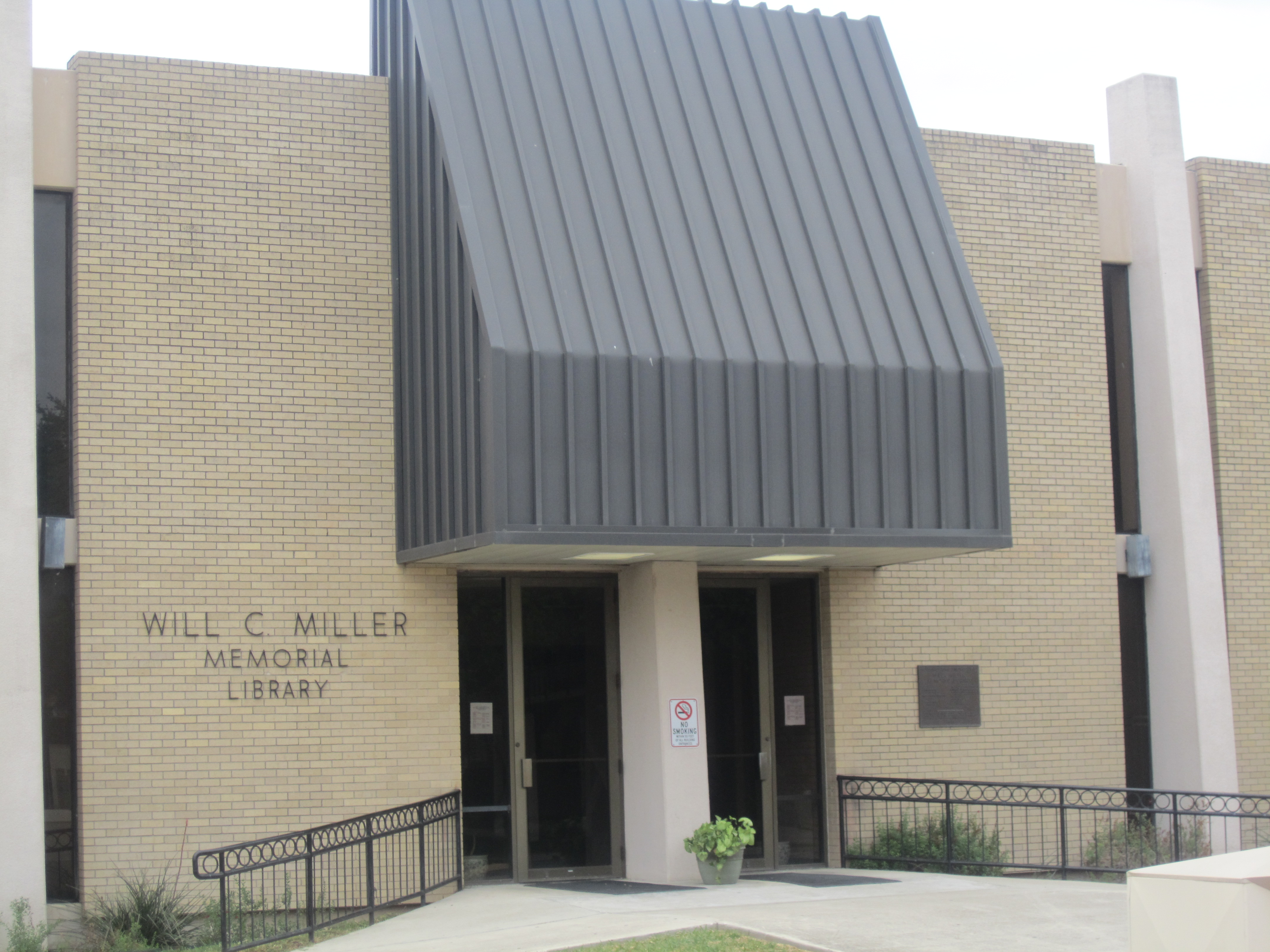
Will C. Miller Library

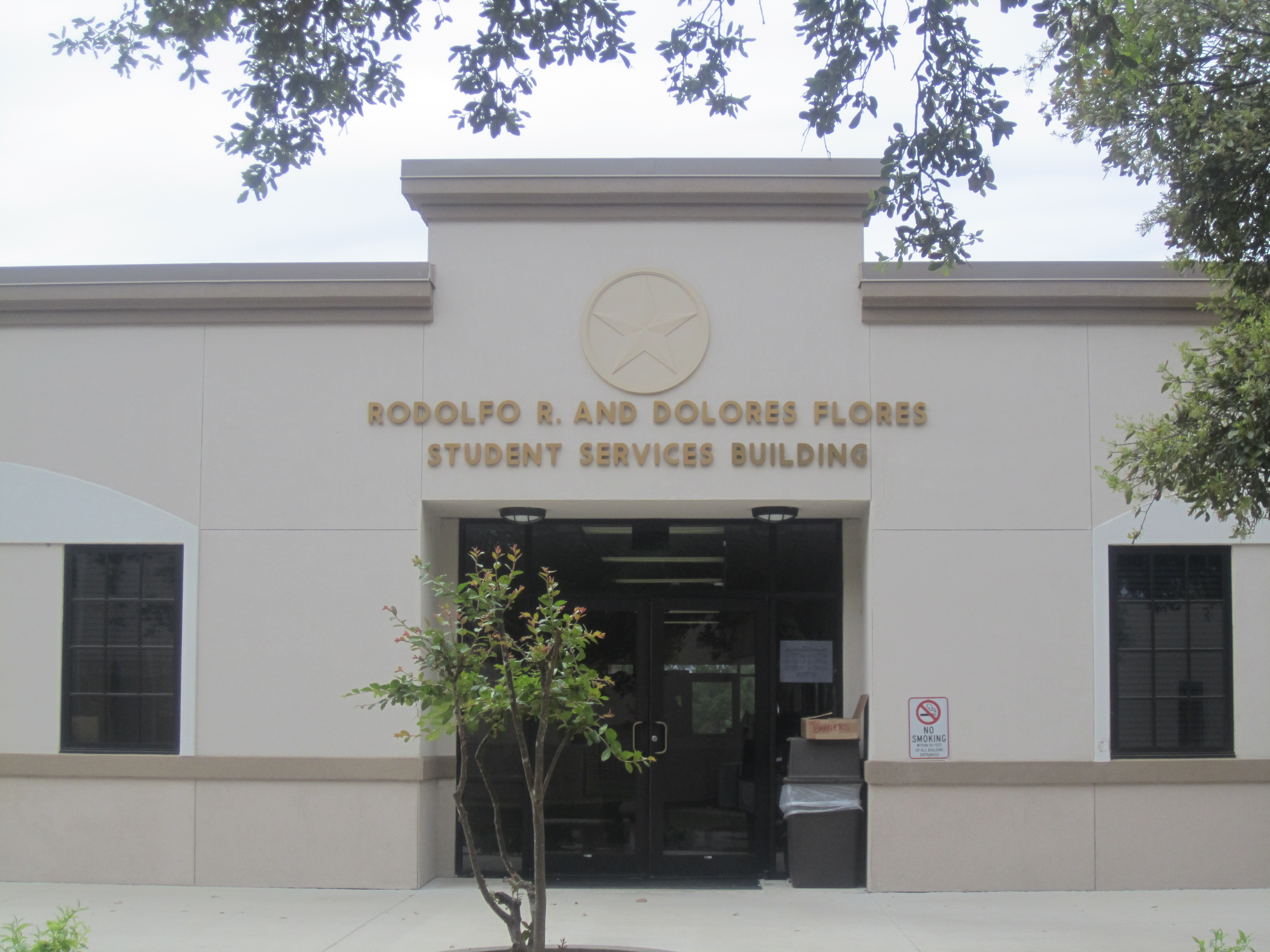
Rodolfo R. and Dolores Flores Student Services Building

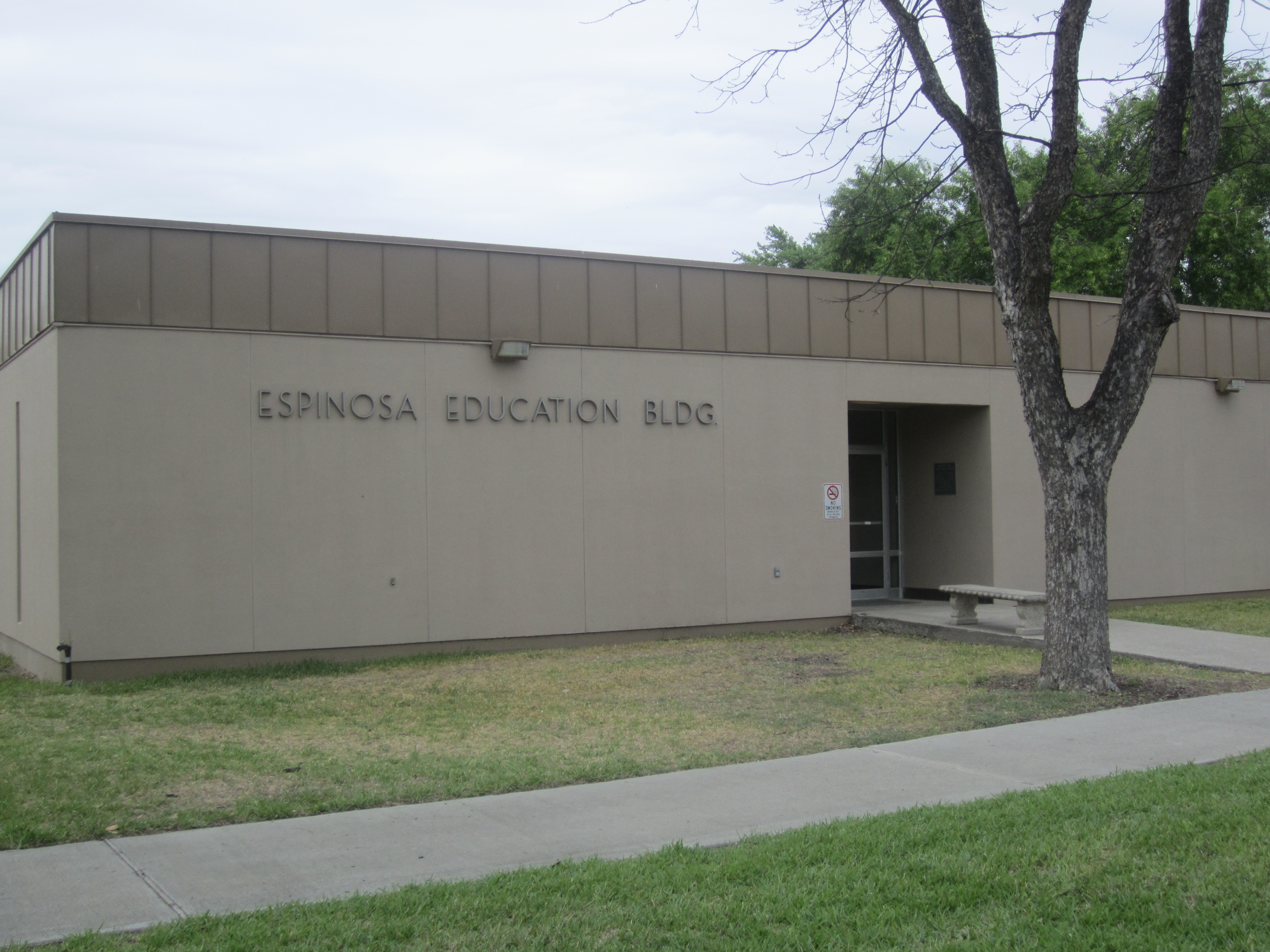
Espinosa Education Building

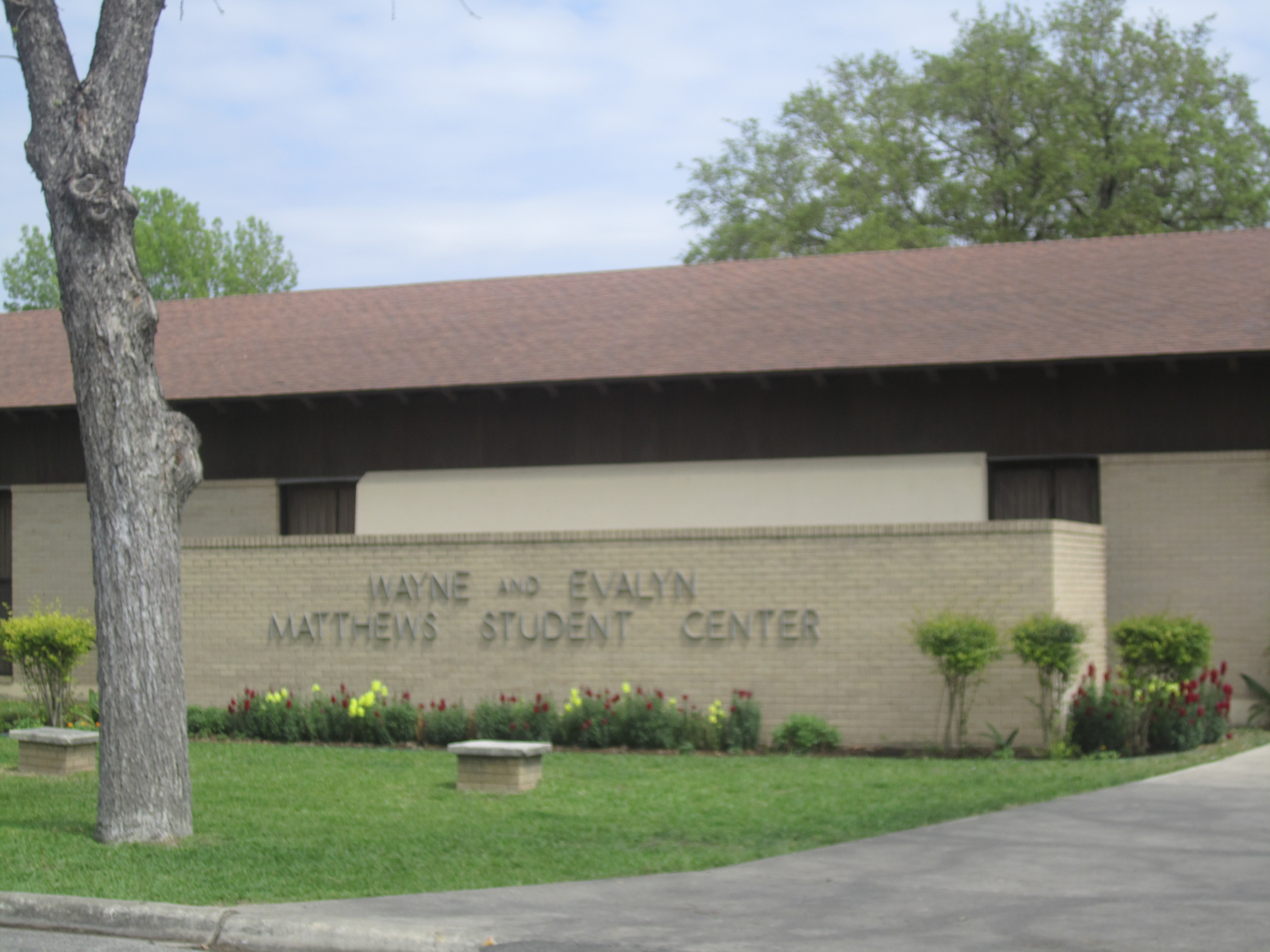
Matthews Student Center

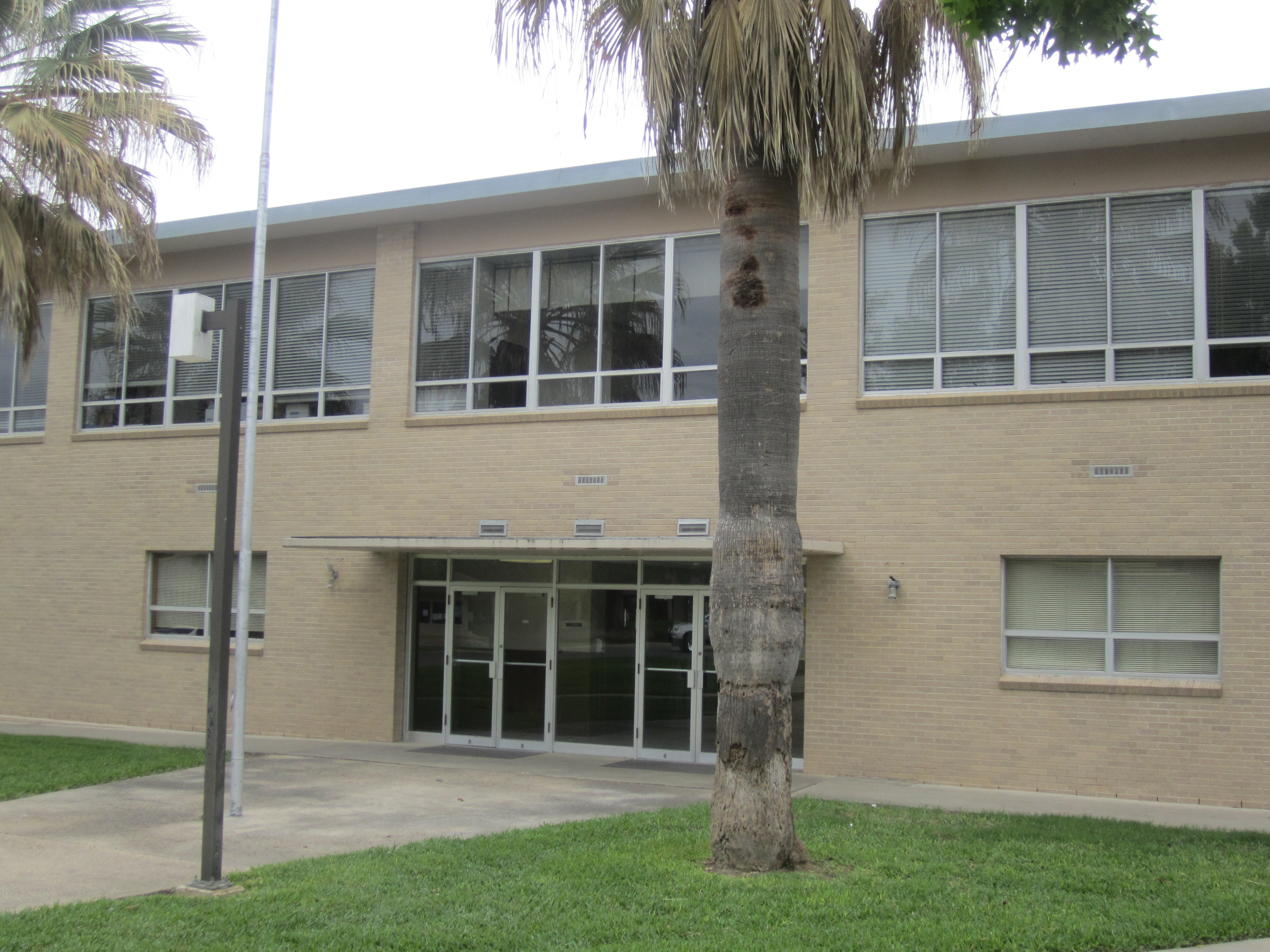
Joe Richarz Memorial Administration Building (constructed 1961)

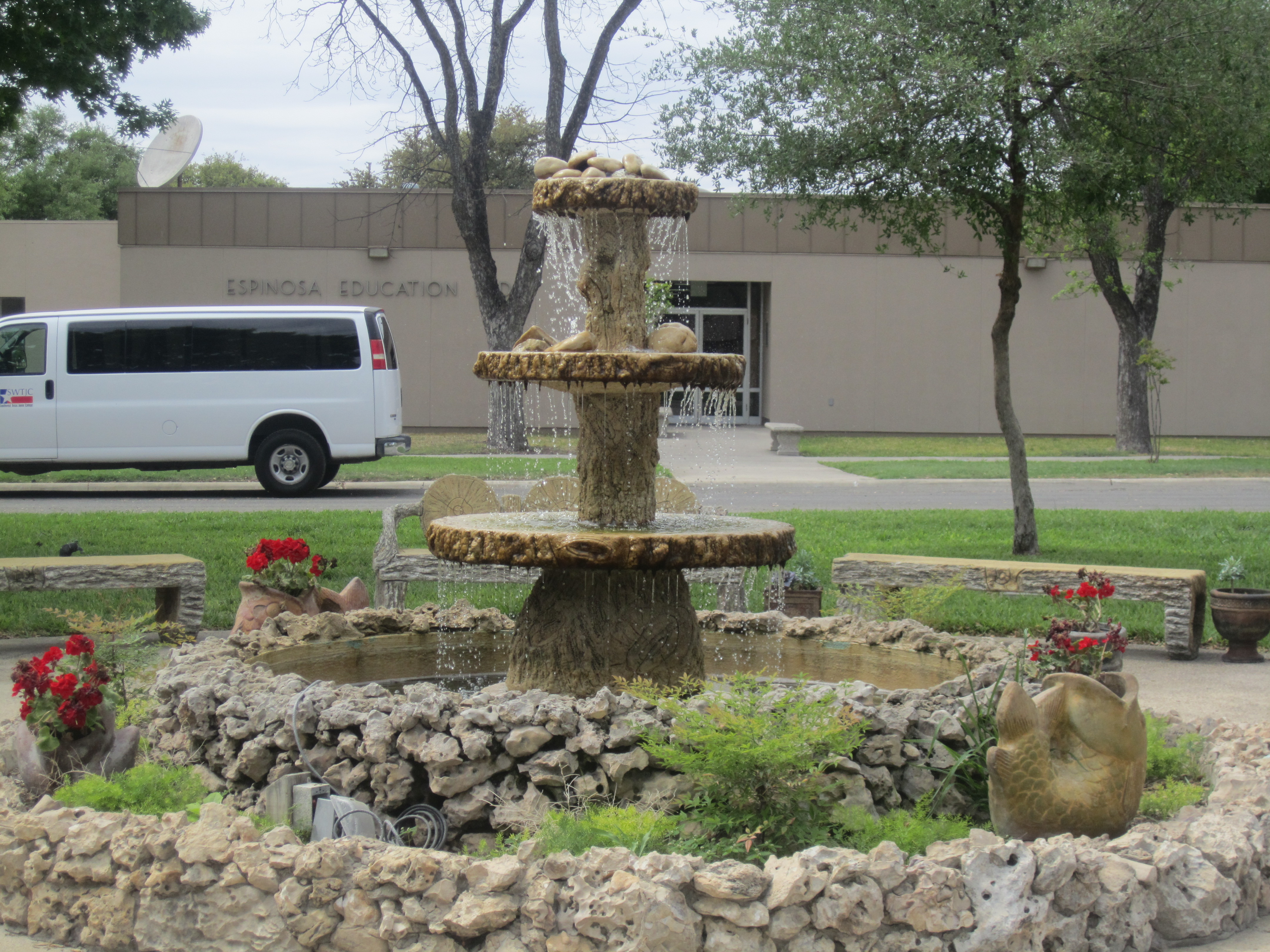
Fountain adjacent to Administration Building

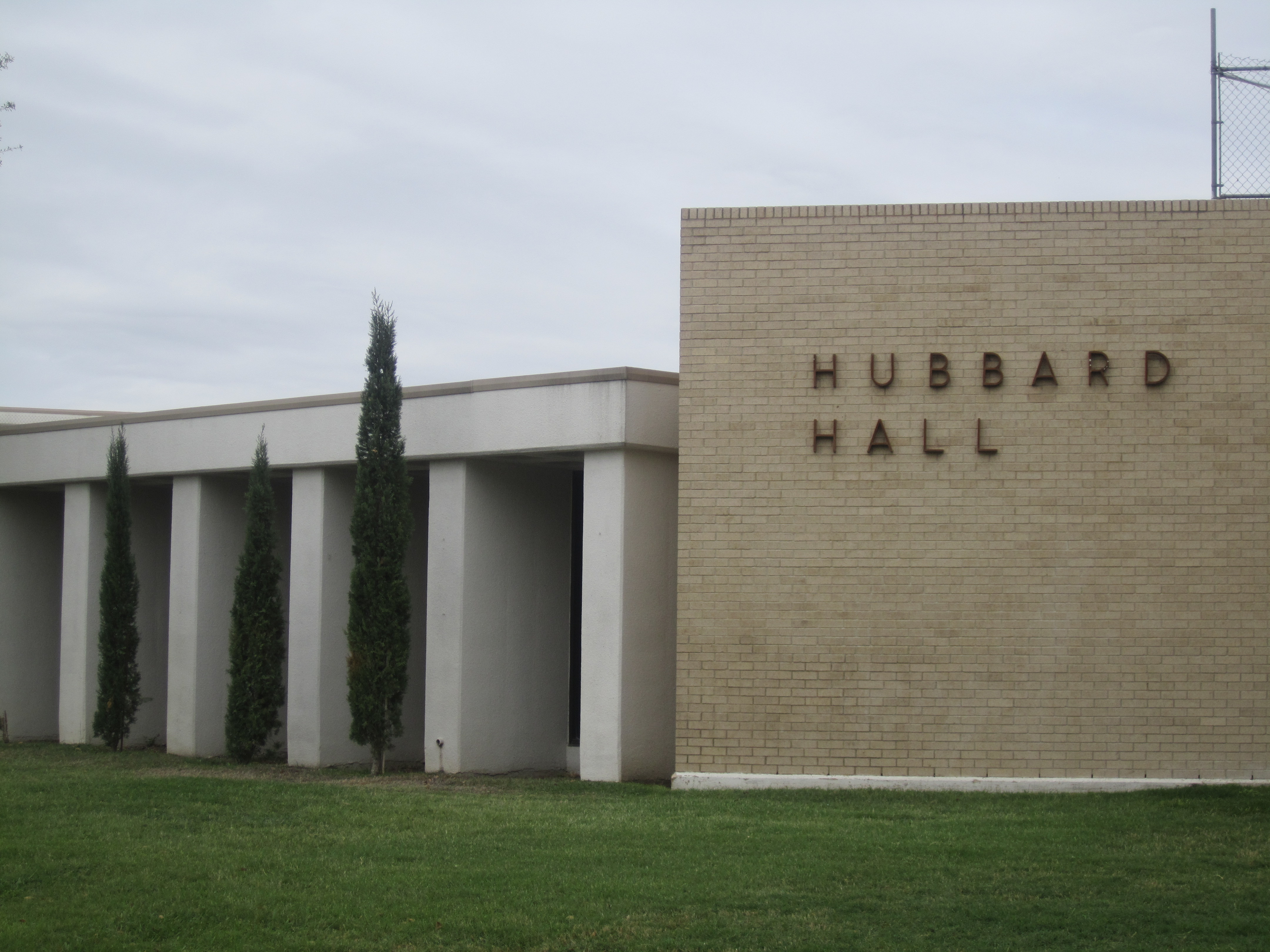
Hubbard Hall coed dormitory
