= Las Palmas, Texas =

- Census-designated place
- Location within the state of Texas
- Coordinates: 26°57′7″N 99°16′31″W
- Country: United States
- State: Texas
- County: Zapata

Area
  - Total: 0.069 sq mi (0.18 km^{2})
  - Land: 0.069 sq mi (0.18 km^{2})
  - Water: 0 sq mi (0.0 km^{2})
- Elevation: 505 ft (154 m)

Population (2020)
  - Total: 59
  - Density: 850/sq mi (330/km^{2})
- Time zone: UTC-6 (Central (CST))
  - Summer (DST): UTC-5 (CDT)
- Zip Code: 78076
- FIPS code: 48-41579

Las Palmas is a census-designated place (CDP) in Zapata County in the U.S. state of Texas. It was a new CDP from the 2010 census. As of the 2020 census, Las Palmas had a population of 59. It is part of the Zapata Micropolitan Statistical Area.

== Geography ==
Las Palmas is in western Zapata County, 4 miles (6 km) north of the center of Zapata, the county seat.

According to the United States Census Bureau, the Las Palmas CDP has a total area of 0.07 square miles (0.18 km^{2}), all land.

== Demographics ==
Historical population
Census	Pop.	Note	%±
2010	67		—
2020	59		−11.9%
U.S. Decennial Census; 1850–1900 1910; 1920 1930 1940; 1950 1960 1970; 1980 1990 2000; 2010 2020

Las Palmas first appeared as a census designated place in the 2010 U.S. census.

=== 2020 census ===
Las Palmas CDP, Texas – Racial and ethnic composition Note: the US Census treats Hispanic/Latino as an ethnic category. This table excludes Latinos from the racial categories and assigns them to a separate category. Hispanics/Latinos may be of any race.
Race / Ethnicity (NH = Non-Hispanic)	Pop 2010	Pop 2020	% 2010	% 2020
White alone (NH)	21	19	31.34%	32.20%
Black or African American alone (NH)	0	0	0.00%	0.00%
Native American or Alaska Native alone (NH)	0	0	0.00%	0.00%
Asian alone (NH)	1	0	1.49%	0.00%
Native Hawaiian or Pacific Islander alone (NH)	0	0	0.00%	0.00%
Other race alone (NH)	0	0	0.00%	0.00%
Mixed race or Multiracial (NH)	0	1	0.00%	1.69%
Hispanic or Latino (any race)	45	39	67.16%	66.10%
Total	67	59	100.00%	100.00%
