= Lopeño, Texas =

- CDP
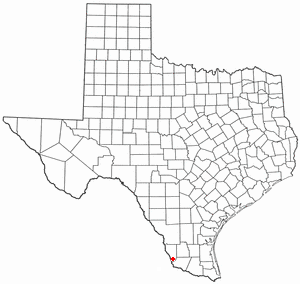
- Location of Lopeño, Texas

- Coordinates: 26°42′36″N 99°6′34″W
- Country: United States
- State: Texas
- County: Zapata

Area
  - Total: 0.77 sq mi (2.0 km^{2})
  - Land: 0.77 sq mi (2.0 km^{2})
  - Water: 0 sq mi (0.0 km^{2})
- Elevation: 390 ft (119 m)

Population (2020)
  - Total: 70
  - Density: 91/sq mi (35/km^{2})
- Time zone: UTC-6 (Central (CST))
  - Summer (DST): UTC-5 (CDT)
- ZIP code: 78564
- Area code: 956
- FIPS code: 48-43960
- GNIS feature ID: 1340548

Lopeño (pronounced loh-peh-nyo) is a census-designated place (CDP) in Zapata County, Texas, United States. As of the 2020 census, Lopeño had a population of 70.

== Geography ==
Lopeño is located at 26°42′36″N 99°6′34″W (26.709987, -99.109457).

According to the United States Census Bureau, the CDP has a total area of 0.8 square mile (2.0 km^{2}), all land.

== Demographics ==
Historical population
| Census | Pop. | Note | %± |
|---|---|---|---|
| 2000 | 140 | | — |
| 2010 | 174 | | 24.3% |
| 2020 | 70 | | −59.8% |
U.S. Decennial Census; 1850–1900 1910; 1920 1930 1940; 1950 1960 1970; 1980 1990 2000; 2010 2020 2020

Lopeño first appeared as a census designated place in the 2000 U.S. census.

=== 2020 census ===
Lopeño CDP, Texas – Racial and ethnic composition Note: the US Census treats Hispanic/Latino as an ethnic category. This table excludes Latinos from the racial categories and assigns them to a separate category. Hispanics/Latinos may be of any race.
| Race / Ethnicity (NH = Non-Hispanic) | Pop 2000 | Pop 2010 | Pop 2020 | % 2000 | % 2010 | % 2020 |
|---|---|---|---|---|---|---|
| White alone (NH) | 11 | 3 | 1 | 7.86% | 1.72% | 1.43% |
| Black or African American alone (NH) | 0 | 0 | 0 | 0.00% | 0.00% | 0.00% |
| Native American or Alaska Native alone (NH) | 1 | 0 | 0 | 0.71% | 0.00% | 0.00% |
| Asian alone (NH) | 0 | 0 | 1 | 0.00% | 0.00% | 1.43% |
| Native Hawaiian or Pacific Islander alone (NH) | 0 | 0 | 0 | 0.00% | 0.00% | 0.00% |
| Other race alone (NH) | 0 | 0 | 0 | 0.00% | 0.00% | 0.00% |
| Mixed race or Multiracial (NH) | 3 | 0 | 2 | 2.14% | 0.00% | 2.86% |
| Hispanic or Latino (any race) | 125 | 171 | 66 | 89.29% | 98.28% | 94.29% |
| Total | 140 | 174 | 70 | 100.00% | 100.00% | 100.00% |

As of the census of 2000, there were 140 people, 41 households, and 35 families residing in the CDP. The population density was 183.2 inhabitants per square mile (70.7/km^{2}). There were 54 housing units at an average density of 70.7 per square mile (27.3/km^{2}). The racial makeup of the CDP was 79.29% White, 0.71% Native American, 14.29% from other races, and 5.71% from two or more races. Hispanic or Latino of any race were 89.29% of the population.

There were 41 households, out of which 36.6% had children under the age of 18 living with them, 73.2% were married couples living together, 14.6% had a female householder with no husband present, and 12.2% were non-families. 12.2% of all households were made up of individuals, and 7.3% had someone living alone who was 65 years of age or older. The average household size was 3.41 and the average family size was 3.72.

In the CDP, the population was spread out, with 30.0% under the age of 18, 10.7% from 18 to 24, 27.1% from 25 to 44, 23.6% from 45 to 64, and 8.6% who were 65 years of age or older. The median age was 30 years. For every 100 females there were 100.0 males. For every 100 females age 18 and over, there were 92.2 males.

The median income for a household in the CDP was $23,077, and the median income for a family was $23,077. Males had a median income of $51,250 versus $0 for females. The per capita income for the CDP was $6,965. There were 39.4% of families and 45.5% of the population living below the poverty line, including 41.4% of under eighteens and none of those over 64.

== Education ==
All of Zapata County is a part of the Zapata County Independent School District.

== History ==
The development of the area began c. 1747 when Col. José de Escandón began bringing colonists to establish permanent settlements along Mexico's northern frontier, when parcels of land were granted to the colonists by the Spanish government. In 1767 Ysabel María Sánchez, widow of early settler and rancher Joseph López, was allotted more than 6000 acres. The village of Lopeño, later developed on this land, was named after the López family.

During the early 1800s, part of the López land passed to the ownership of the Ramírez family founders of the nearby village of Falcón. In 1821, Benito Ramírez built a combination home, fort, and chapel that came to be Fort Lopeño. Federal troops briefly occupied the fort during 1856 to ease border disturbances.

A general store, established in the early 1900s by Serafín Benavides, served as the area's only supply point at the time. A post office was established in 1920 and in 1934 oil and gas were drilled in the area.
