= Falcon Lake Estates, Texas =

- CDP
- Coordinates: 26°52′19″N 99°15′21″W
- Country: United States
- State: Texas
- County: Zapata

Area
  - Total: 1.53 sq mi (4.0 km^{2})
  - Land: 0.67 sq mi (1.7 km^{2})
  - Water: 0.86 sq mi (2.2 km^{2})
- Elevation: 354 ft (108 m)

Population (2020)
  - Total: 962
  - Density: 1,400/sq mi (550/km^{2})
- Time zone: UTC-6 (Central (CST))
  - Summer (DST): UTC-5 (CDT)
- Zip Code: 78076
- FIPS code: 48-25348
- GNIS feature ID: 1852705

Falcon Lake Estates is a census-designated place (CDP) in Zapata County, Texas, United States. The population was 962 at the 2020 census.

== Geography ==
Falcon Lake Estates is located at 26°52′19″N 99°15′21″W (26.871966, -99.255946).

According to the United States Census Bureau, the CDP has a total area of 1.53 square miles (4.0 km^{2}), of which 0.67 square miles (1.7 km^{2}) is land and 0.86 square miles (2.2 km^{2}) is water.

== Demographics ==
Historical population
| Census | Pop. | Note | %± |
|---|---|---|---|
| 2000 | 830 | | — |
| 2010 | 1,036 | | 24.8% |
| 2020 | 962 | | −7.1% |
U.S. Decennial Census; 1850–1900 1910; 1920 1930 1940; 1950 1960 1970; 1980 1990 2000; 2010 2020

Falcon Lake Estates first appeared as a census designated place in the 2000 U.S. census.

=== 2020 census ===
Falcon Lake Estates CDP, Texas – Racial and ethnic composition Note: the US Census treats Hispanic/Latino as an ethnic category. This table excludes Latinos from the racial categories and assigns them to a separate category. Hispanics/Latinos may be of any race.
| Race / Ethnicity (NH = Non-Hispanic) | Pop 2000 | Pop 2010 | Pop 2020 | % 2000 | % 2010 | % 2020 |
|---|---|---|---|---|---|---|
| White alone (NH) | 261 | 170 | 99 | 31.45% | 16.41% | 10.29% |
| Black or African American alone (NH) | 4 | 0 | 0 | 0.48% | 0.00% | 0.00% |
| Native American or Alaska Native alone (NH) | 0 | 1 | 1 | 0.00% | 0.00% | 0.10% |
| Asian alone (NH) | 10 | 7 | 0 | 1.20% | 0.68% | 0.00% |
| Native Hawaiian or Pacific Islander alone (NH) | 0 | 0 | 0 | 0.00% | 0.00% | 0.00% |
| Other Race alone (NH) | 0 | 0 | 4 | 0.00% | 0.00% | 0.42% |
| Mixed race or Multiracial (NH) | 3 | 3 | 2 | 0.36% | 0.29% | 0.21% |
| Hispanic or Latino (any race) | 552 | 855 | 856 | 66.51% | 82.53% | 88.98% |
| Total | 830 | 1,036 | 962 | 100.00% | 100.00% | 100.00% |

As of the census of 2000, there were 830 people, 306 households, and 231 families residing in the CDP. The population density was 1,180.1 inhabitants per square mile (455.6/km^{2}). There were 514 housing units at an average density of 730.8 per square mile (282.2/km^{2}). The racial makeup of the CDP was 88.19% White, 1.08% African American, 1.20% Asian, 8.31% from other races, and 1.20% from two or more races. Hispanic or Latino of any race were 66.51% of the population.

There were 306 households, out of which 39.9% had children under the age of 18 living with them, 64.7% were married couples living together, 8.5% had a female householder with no husband present, and 24.2% were non-families. 19.6% of all households were made up of individuals, and 11.4% had someone living alone who was 65 years of age or older. The average household size was 2.71 and the average family size was 3.12.

In the CDP, the population was spread out, with 29.8% under the age of 18, 7.1% from 18 to 24, 27.1% from 25 to 44, 19.9% from 45 to 64, and 16.1% who were 65 years of age or older. The median age was 33 years. For every 100 females, there were 101.9 males. For every 100 females age 18 and over, there were 101.7 males.

The median income for a household in the CDP was $31,328, and the median income for a family was $45,260. Males had a median income of $35,958 versus $20,536 for females. The per capita income for the CDP was $16,590. About 15.3% of families and 18.9% of the population were below the poverty line, including 28.4% of those under age 18 and 14.6% of those age 65 or over.

== Education ==
All of Zapata County is a part of the Zapata County Independent School District.
