= New Falcon, Texas =

- CDP
- Coordinates: 26°38′19″N 99°5′44″W
- Country: United States
- State: Texas
- County: Zapata

Area
  - Total: 0.19 sq mi (0.5 km^{2})
  - Land: 0.19 sq mi (0.5 km^{2})
  - Water: 0 sq mi (0.0 km^{2})
- Elevation: 420 ft (128 m)

Population (2020)
  - Total: 117
  - Density: 610/sq mi (230/km^{2})
- Time zone: UTC-6 (Central (CST))
  - Summer (DST): UTC-5 (CDT)
- Zip Code: 78545
- FIPS code: 48-50924
- GNIS feature ID: 1852741

New Falcon is a census-designated place (CDP) in Zapata County, Texas, United States. The population was 117 at the 2020 census.

== Geography ==
New Falcon is located at 26°38′19″N 99°5′44″W (26.638508, -99.095450).

According to the United States Census Bureau, the CDP has a total area of 0.2 square miles (0.52 km^{2}), all land.

== Demographics ==
Historical population
Census	Pop.	Note	%±
2000	184		—
2010	191		3.8%
2020	117		−38.7%
U.S. Decennial Census; 1850–1900 1910; 1920 1930 1940; 1950 1960 1970; 1980 1990 2000; 2010 2020

New Falcon first appeared as a census designated place in the 2000 U.S. census.

=== 2020 census ===
New Falcon CDP, Texas – Racial and ethnic composition Note: the US Census treats Hispanic/Latino as an ethnic category. This table excludes Latinos from the racial categories and assigns them to a separate category. Hispanics/Latinos may be of any race.
Race / Ethnicity (NH = Non-Hispanic)	Pop 2000	Pop 2010	Pop 2020	% 2000	% 2010	% 2020
White alone (NH)	0	3	0	0.00%	1.57%	0.00%
Black or African American alone (NH)	0	0	0	0.00%	0.00%	0.00%
Native American or Alaska Native alone (NH)	0	0	0	0.00%	0.00%	0.00%
Asian alone (NH)	0	0	0	0.00%	0.00%	0.00%
Native Hawaiian or Pacific Islander alone (NH)	0	0	0	0.00%	0.00%	0.00%
Other Race alone (NH)	0	0	0	0.00%	0.00%	0.00%
Mixed race or Multiracial (NH)	0	0	0	0.00%	0.00%	0.00%
Hispanic or Latino (any race)	184	188	117	100.00%	98.43%	100.00%
Total	184	191	117	100.00%	100.00%	100.00%

As of the census of 2000, there were 184 people, 62 households, and 49 families residing in the CDP. The population density was 911.6 inhabitants per square mile (352.0/km^{2}). There were 85 housing units at an average density of 421.1 units per square mile (162.6 units/km^{2}). The racial makeup of the CDP was 81.52% White, 2.17% Native American, 13.04% from other races, and 3.26% from two or more races. Hispanic or Latino of any race were 100.00% of the population.

There were 62 households, out of which 45.2% had children under the age of 18 living with them, 64.5% were married couples living together, 11.3% had a female householder with no husband present, and 19.4% were non-families. 17.7% of all households were made up of individuals, and 12.9% had someone living alone who was 65 years of age or older. The average household size was 2.97 and the average family size was 3.36.

In the CDP, the population was spread out, with 31.0% under the age of 18, 10.9% from 18 to 24, 23.9% from 25 to 44, 16.8% from 45 to 64, and 17.4% who were 65 years of age or older. The median age was 32 years. For every 100 females, there were 95.7 males. For every 100 females age 18 and over, there were 84.1 males.

The median income for a household in the CDP was $14,688, and the median income for a family was $14,688. Males had a median income of $10,625 versus $36,250 for females. The per capita income for the CDP was $8,971. About 34.0% of families and 42.7% of the population were below the poverty line, including 47.6% of those under the age of eighteen and 16.2% of those 65 or over.

== Education ==
All of Zapata County is a part of the Zapata County Independent School District.
