= Siesta Shores, Texas =

- CDP
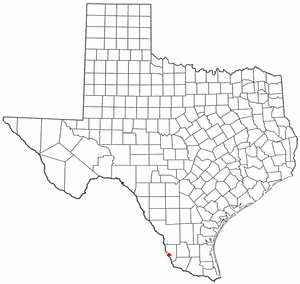
- Location of Siesta Shores, Texas

- Coordinates: 26°51′25″N 99°15′8″W
- Country: United States
- State: Texas
- County: Zapata

Area
  - Total: 1.6 sq mi (4.1 km^{2})
  - Land: 0.73 sq mi (1.9 km^{2})
  - Water: 0.85 sq mi (2.2 km^{2})
- Elevation: 374 ft (114 m)

Population (2020)
  - Total: 1,450
  - Density: 2,000/sq mi (770/km^{2})
- Time zone: UTC-6 (Central (CST))
  - Summer (DST): UTC-5 (CDT)
- Zip Code: 78076
- FIPS code: 48-67778
- GNIS feature ID: 1347112

Siesta Shores is a census-designated place (CDP) in Zapata County, Texas, United States. The population was 1,450 at the 2020 census.

== Geography ==
Siesta Shores is located at 26°51′25″N 99°15′8″W (26.856887, -99.252222).

According to the United States Census Bureau, the CDP has a total area of 1.6 square miles (4.1 km^{2}), of which 0.73 square miles (1.9 km^{2}) is land and 0.85 square miles (2.2 km^{2}) is water.

== Demographics ==
Historical population
Census	Pop.	Note	%±
2000	890		—
2010	1,382		55.3%
2020	1,450		4.9%
U.S. Decennial Census; 1850–1900 1910; 1920 1930 1940; 1950 1960 1970; 1980 1990 2000; 2010 2020

Siesta Shores first appeared as a census designated place in the 2000 U.S. census.

=== 2020 census ===
Siesta Shores CDP, Texas – Racial and ethnic composition Note: the US Census treats Hispanic/Latino as an ethnic category. This table excludes Latinos from the racial categories and assigns them to a separate category. Hispanics/Latinos may be of any race.
Race / Ethnicity (NH = Non-Hispanic)	Pop 2000	Pop 2010	Pop 2020	% 2000	% 2010	% 2020
White alone (NH)	178	83	67	20.00%	6.01%	4.62%
Black or African American alone (NH)	0	0	0	0.00%	0.00%	0.00%
Native American or Alaska Native alone (NH)	0	5	3	0.00%	0.36%	0.21%
Asian alone (NH)	1	1	3	0.11%	0.07%	0.21%
Native Hawaiian or Pacific Islander alone (NH)	0	0	0	0.00%	0.00%	0.00%
Other race alone (NH)	0	0	1	0.00%	0.00%	0.07%
Mixed race or Multiracial (NH)	0	0	3	0.00%	0.00%	0.21%
Hispanic or Latino (any race)	711	1,293	1,373	79.89%	93.56%	94.69%
Total	890	1,382	1,450	100.00%	100.00%	100.00%

As of the census of 2000, there were 890 people, 292 households, and 244 families residing in the CDP. The population density was 1,418.1 inhabitants per square mile (547.5/km^{2}). There were 457 housing units at an average density of 728.2 units per square mile (281.2 units/km^{2}). The racial makeup of the CDP was 83.48% White, 0.34% African American, 0.34% Native American, 0.11% Asian, 14.61% from other races, and 1.12% from two or more races. Hispanic or Latino of any race were 79.89% of the population.

There were 292 households, out of which 42.5% had children under the age of 18 living with them, 69.5% were married couples living together, 11.3% had a female householder with no husband present, and 16.4% were non-families. 14.0% of all households were made up of individuals, and 5.8% had someone living alone who was 65 years of age or older. The average household size was 3.05 and the average family size was 3.36.

In the CDP, the population was spread out, with 32.6% under the age of 18, 10.1% from 18 to 24, 23.1% from 25 to 44, 19.6% from 45 to 64, and 14.6% who were 65 years of age or older. The median age was 32 years. For every 100 females, there were 91.4 males. For every 100 females age 18 and over, there were 88.1 males.

The median income for a household in the CDP was $24,808, and the median income for a family was $27,679. Males had a median income of $30,208 versus $13,207 for females. The per capita income for the CDP was $11,484. About 14.6% of families and 19.2% of the population were below the poverty line, including 25.5% of those under age 18 and 5.1% of those age 65 or over.

== Education ==
All of Zapata County is a part of the Zapata County Independent School District.
