= Medina, Texas =

Medina, Texas may refer to the following places in Texas:

- Medina, Bandera County, Texas, an unincorporated community
- Medina, Zapata County, Texas, a census-designated place
- Medina County, Texas

== See also ==
- Rio Medina, Texas, an unincorporated community in Medina County
