= San Ygnacio, Texas =

Census-designated place in Zapata County, Texas, United States

- Unincorporated community Census-designated place
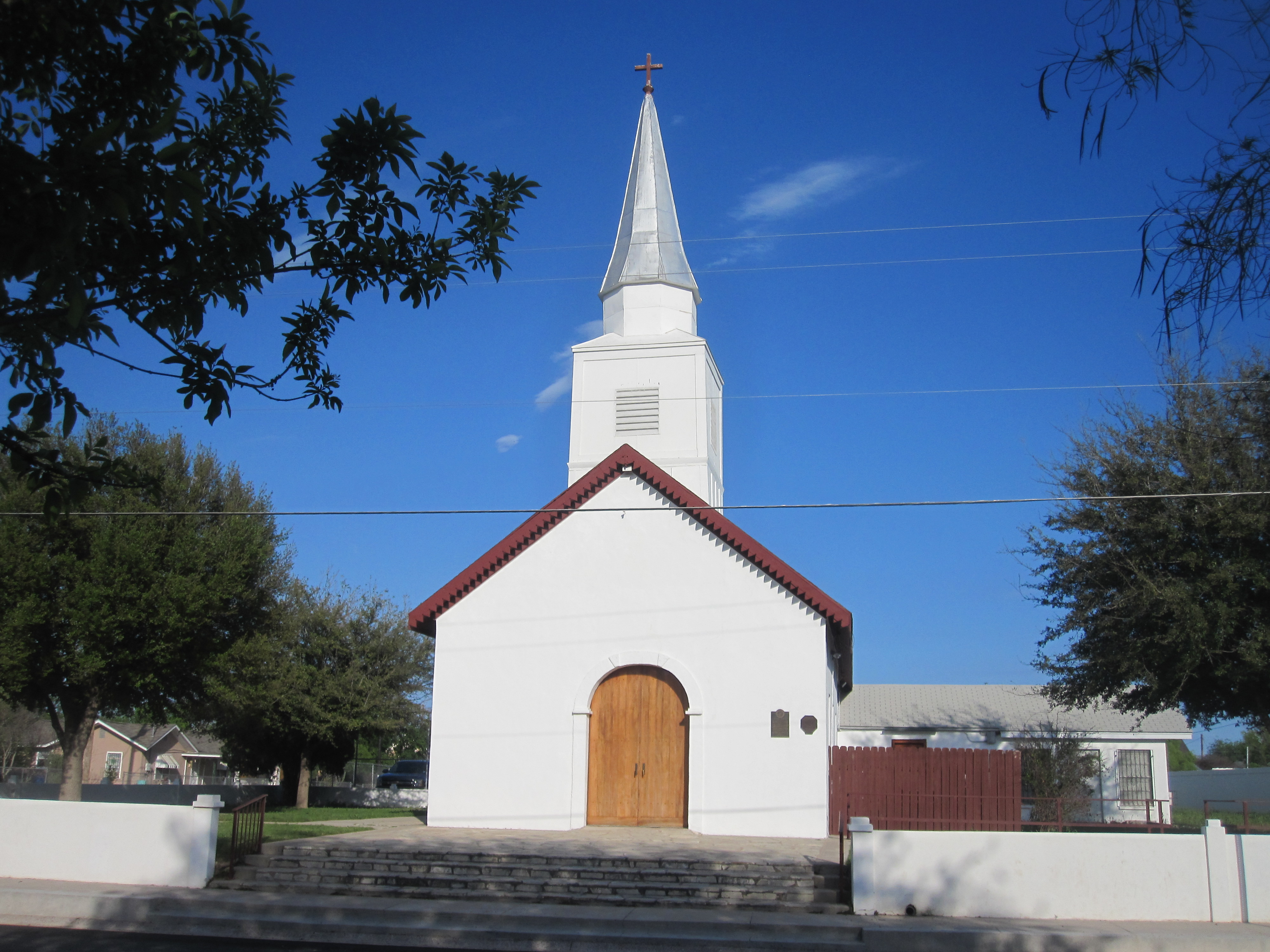
- Historic Our Lady of Refugio Catholic Church

- Location within the state of Texas
- Coordinates: 27°2′38″N 99°26′23″W
- Country: United States
- State: Texas
- County: Zapata

Area
  - Total: 1.6 sq mi (4.1 km^{2})
  - Land: 1.5 sq mi (3.9 km^{2})
  - Water: 0.1 sq mi (0.26 km^{2})

Population (2020)
  - Total: 504
  - Density: 340/sq mi (130/km^{2})
- Time zone: UTC-6 (Central (CST))
  - Summer (DST): UTC-5 (CDT)
- Zip Code: 78067
- FIPS code: 48-65792
- San Ygnacio Historic District
- U.S. National Register of Historic Places
- U.S. Historic district
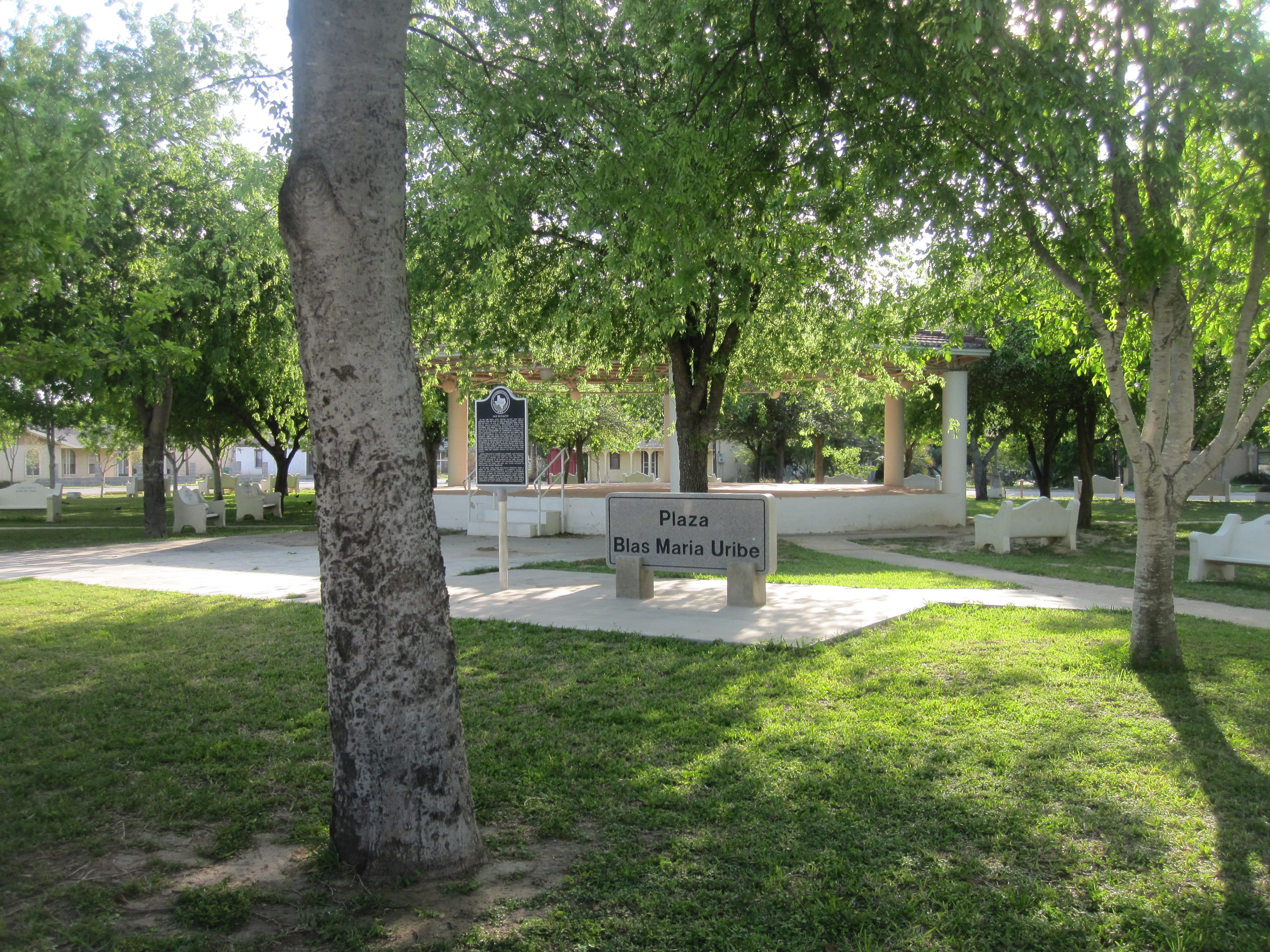
- Plaza Blas Maria Uribe in the historic district of San Ygnacio
- Location: Town of San Ygnacio, San Ygnacio, Texas
- Area: 294.5 acres (119.2 ha)
- Built: 1830
- Architect: Trevino, Jesus
- NRHP reference No.: 73001988
- Added to NRHP: July 16, 1973

San Ygnacio is an unincorporated community in Zapata County, Texas, United States. For statistical purposes, the United States Census Bureau has defined San Ygnacio as a census-designated place (CDP). As of the 2020 census, the CDP population was 504. It is named for the prominent Spanish saint, Ignatius of Loyola. The portion of the community between the Rio Grande and U.S. Highway 83 is listed on the National Register of Historic Places (NRHP) as San Ygnacio Historic District.

== History ==
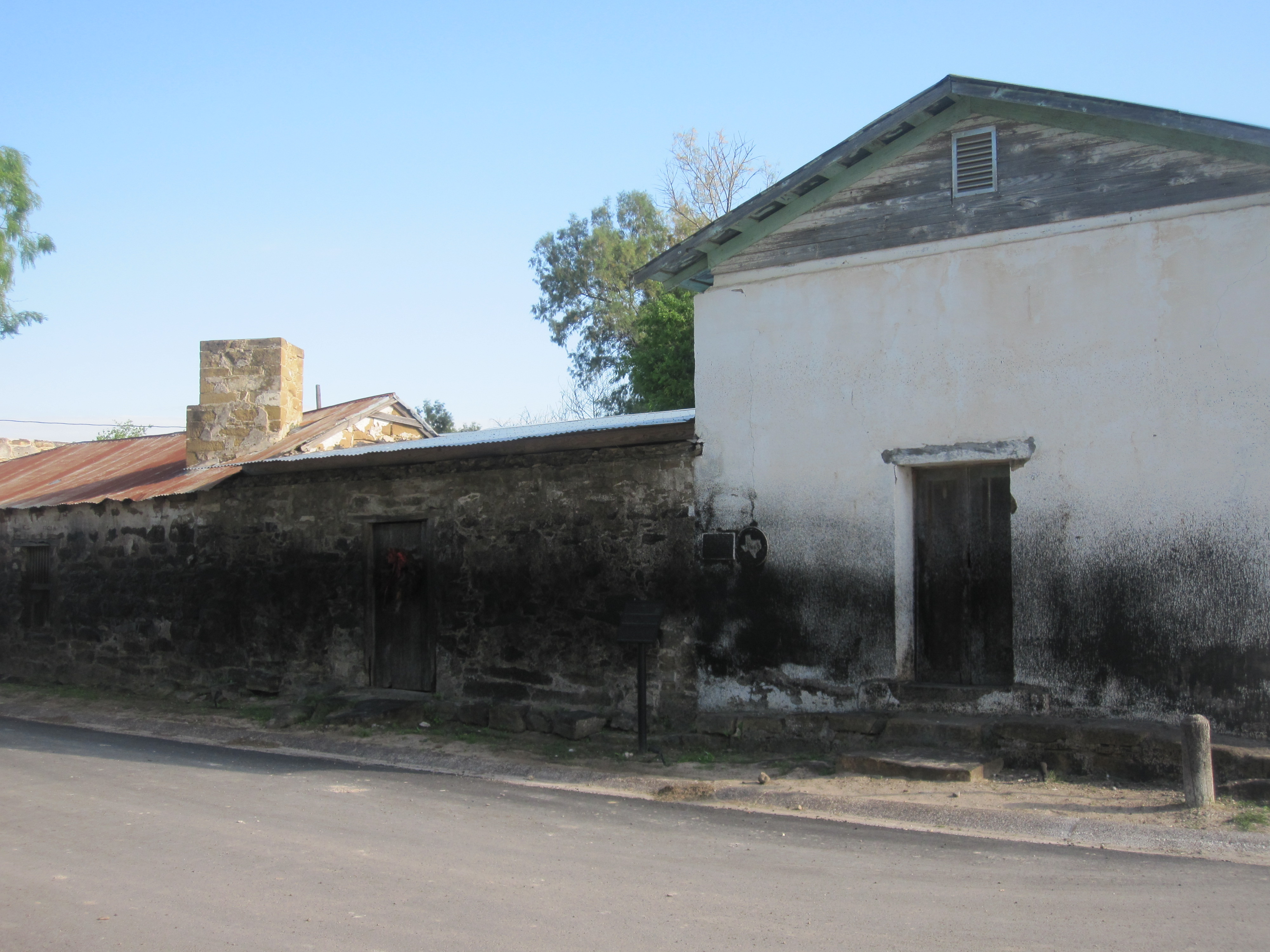
The Jesus Trevino Rancho is a national landmark at the intersection of Trevino and Uribe streets in San Ygnacio, Texas. This north side of the structure was accidentally peppered with tar by a truck early in 2010 and has now been restored.

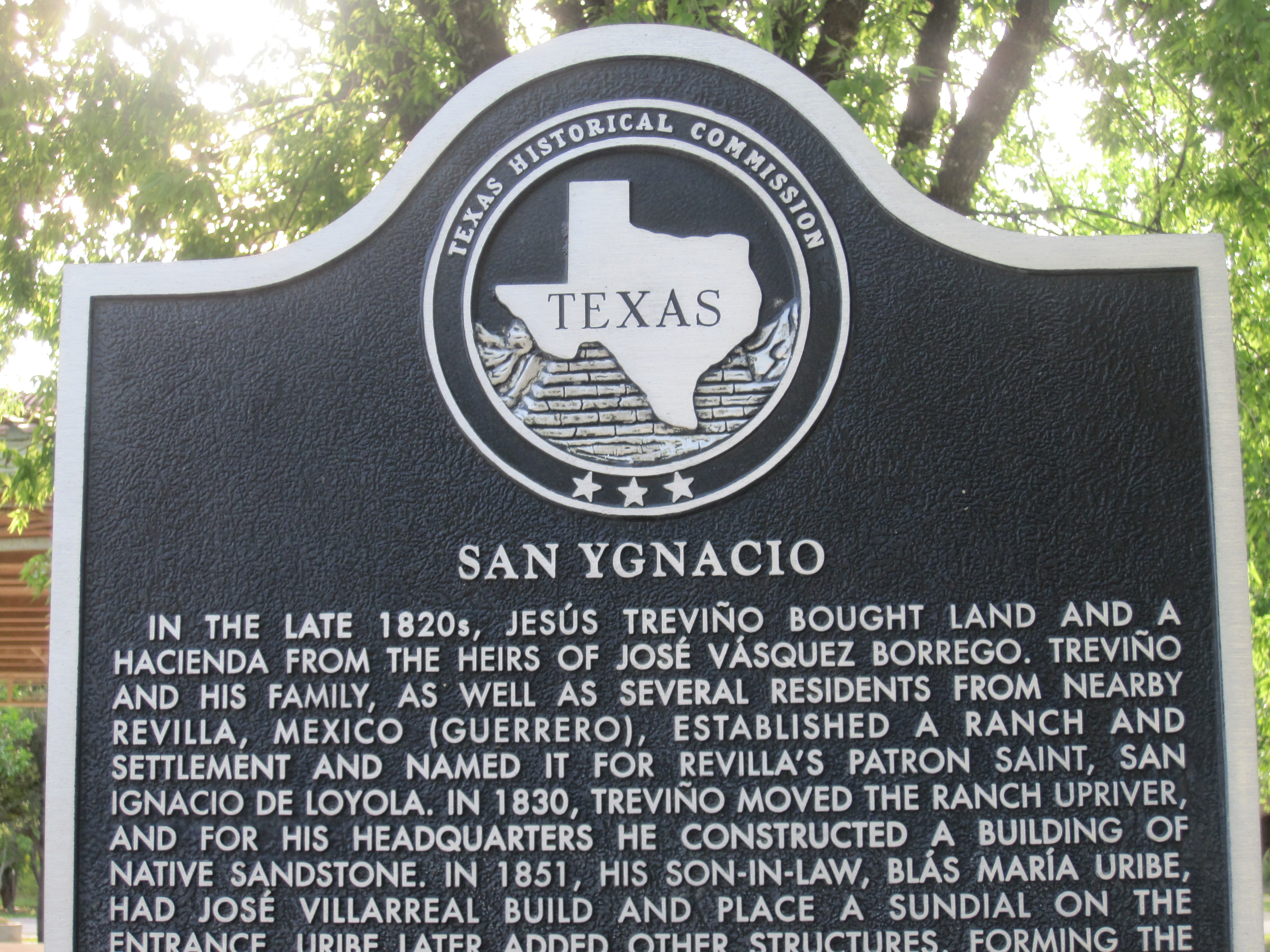
Historical marker in San Ygnacio

San Ygnacio, originally a Mexican pueblo, was founded in 1830 by settlers from nearby Guerrero, Tamaulipas on the outskirts of the recently established Uribeno Ranch. Frequent Comanche attacks in the early days of San Ygnacio necessitated the use of defensive stone architecture which has endowed the present area with uncharacteristically enduring historical sites from that period.

San Ygnacio is also historically notable for its involvement in the short-lived revolution of the Rio Grande Republic, which was established at meetings which were convened in the town in 1839.

San Ygnacio played an important role in the Garza Revolution from 1891 to 1893. Multiple small battles were fought near the town in both Mexican and American territory.

San Ygnacio was attacked in June 1916 by either Mexican Carrancistas or Seditionists. On June 10, approximately 100 Mexicans fought a losing battle with about 150 American soldiers from the 14th Cavalry.

San Ygnacio was the site of the filming of the 1952 film Viva Zapata.

Although many of San Ygnacio's neighboring municipalities were evacuated and consolidated in the deliberate 1953 flooding of the region which created Falcon Lake and "New" Zapata, San Ygnacio's residents petitioned for the right to remain on their land, which was high enough to escape substantial damage. Having survived, its architectural heritage was acknowledged in 1972 when it was added to the National Register of Historic Places, being the last standing collection of Mexican Ranch vernacular architecture, representing the 19th century settlement of the lower Rio Grande valley. Its oldest building is now a National Historic Landmark, the Treviño-Uribe Rancho, built 1830.

The private River Pierce Foundation works to continue the restoration of the San Ygnacio Historic District.

== Geography ==
According to the United States Census Bureau, the CDP has a total area of 1.6 square miles (4.1 km^{2}), of which 1.5 square miles (3.9 km^{2}) is land and 0.1 square miles (0.26 km^{2}) is water.

== Wildlife ==
The community is also one of the few locations within the United States to view the Morelet’s seedeater, a small sparrow-like bird that inhabits second growth stands of Phragmites along the Rio Grande.

== Demographics ==
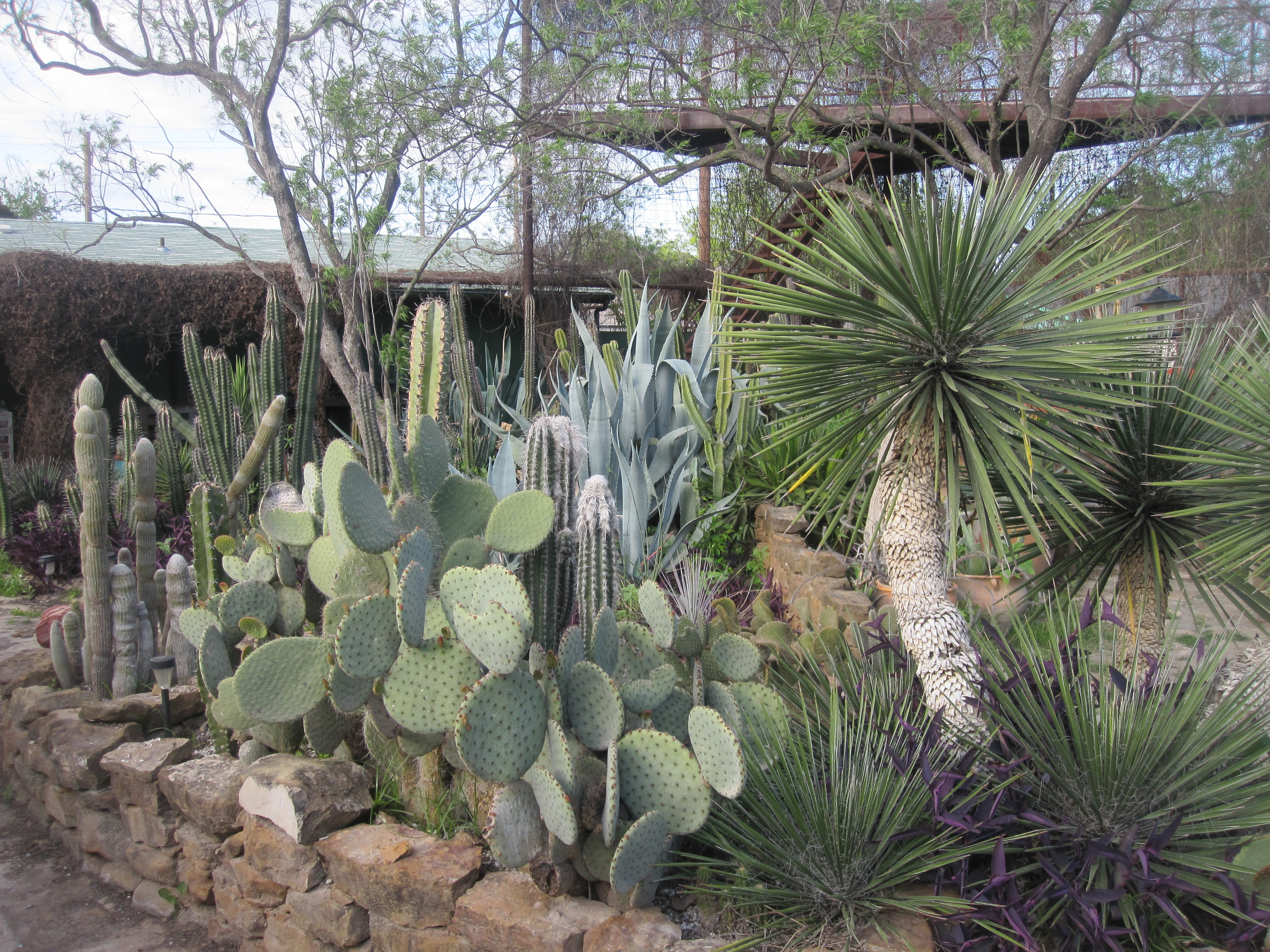
Cactus garden at the Zaragosa house

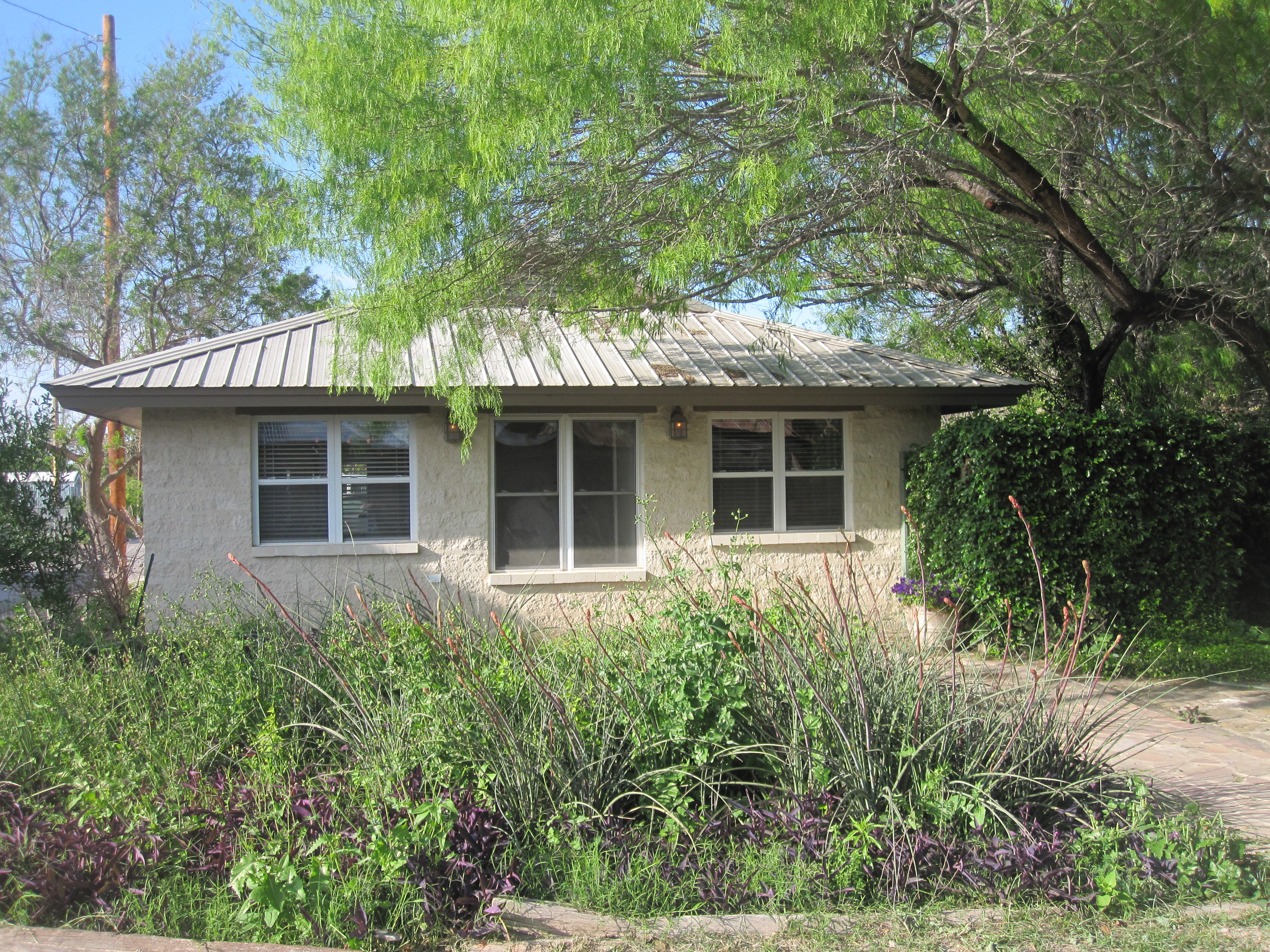
Office of the River Pierce Foundation, designed by Randy T. Rickels (1938-2004) of Austin.

Historical population
Census	Pop.	Note	%±
2000	853		—
2010	667		−21.8%
2020	504		−24.4%
U.S. Decennial Census; 1850–1900 1910; 1920 1930 1940; 1950 1960 1970; 1980 1990 2000; 2010 2020

San Ygnacio first appeared as a census designated place in the 2000 U.S. census.

=== 2020 census ===
San Ygnacio CDP, Texas – Racial and ethnic composition Note: the US Census treats Hispanic/Latino as an ethnic category. This table excludes Latinos from the racial categories and assigns them to a separate category. Hispanics/Latinos may be of any race.
Race / Ethnicity (NH = Non-Hispanic)	Pop 2000	Pop 2010	Pop 2020	% 2000	% 2010	% 2020
White alone (NH)	47	18	39	5.51%	2.70%	7.74%
Black or African American alone (NH)	10	0	0	1.17%	0.00%	0.00%
Native American or Alaska Native alone (NH)	1	2	0	0.12%	0.30%	0.00%
Asian alone (NH)	0	0	0	0.00%	0.00%	0.00%
Native Hawaiian or Pacific Islander alone (NH)	0	0	0	0.00%	0.00%	0.00%
Other Race alone (NH)	0	1	0	0.00%	0.15%	0.00%
Mixed race or Multiracial (NH)	2	0	0	0.23%	0.00%	0.00%
Hispanic or Latino (any race)	793	646	465	92.97%	96.85%	92.26%
Total	853	667	504	100.00%	100.00%	100.00%

As of the census of 2000, there were 853 people, 253 households, and 198 families residing in the CDP. The population density was 556.7 inhabitants per square mile (214.9/km^{2}). There were 355 housing units at an average density of 231.7 per square mile (89.5/km^{2}). The racial makeup of the CDP was 79.13% White, 1.17% African American, 0.35% Native American, 17.35% from other races, and 1.99% from two or more races. Hispanic or Latino of any race were 92.97% of the population.

There were 253 households, out of which 44.7% had children under the age of 18 living with them, 58.9% were married couples living together, 15.8% had a female householder with no husband present, and 21.7% were non-families. 20.6% of all households were made up of individuals, and 11.9% had someone living alone who was 65 years of age or older. The average household size was 3.37 and the average family size was 3.97.

In the CDP, the population was spread out, with 33.6% under the age of 18, 11.4% from 18 to 24, 23.9% from 25 to 44, 19.7% from 45 to 64, and 11.4% who were 65 years of age or older. The median age was 30 years. For every 100 females, there were 107.5 males. For every 100 females age 18 and over, there were 101.4 males.

The median income for a household in the CDP was $16,563, and the median income for a family was $19,375. Males had a median income of $17,344 versus $12,188 for females. The per capita income for the CDP was $6,968. About 48.2% of families and 54.5% of the population were below the poverty line, including 61.1% of those under age 18 and 25.4% of those age 65 or over.

== Education ==
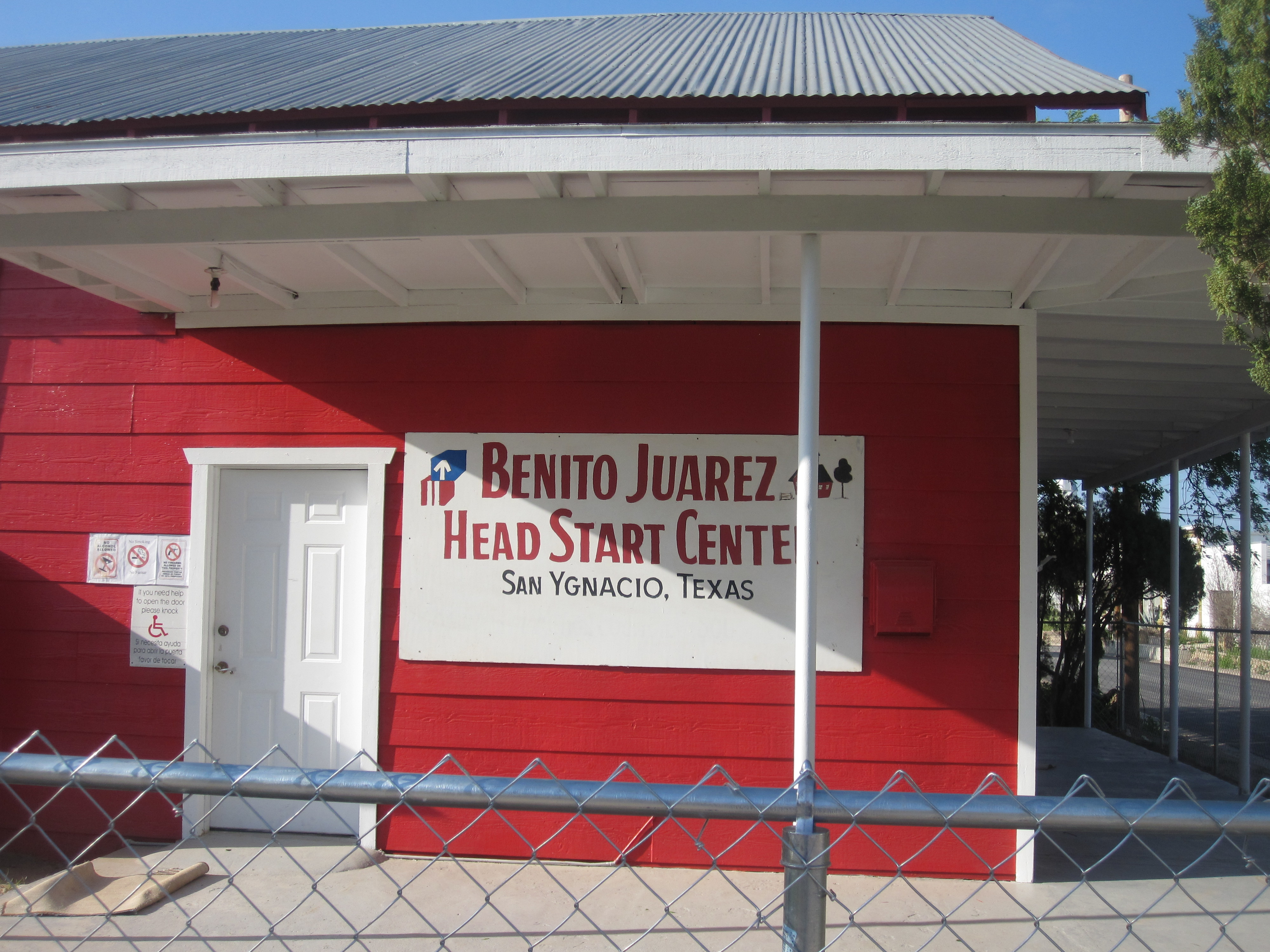
The Benito Juárez Head Start Center in the community's historic district

All of Zapata County is a part of the Zapata County Independent School District.

== See also ==
- List of census-designated places in Texas
- National Register of Historic Places listings in Zapata County, Texas

== Bibliography ==
Lott, Virgil N., and Martinez, Sr., Mercurio J. (1953) (father of Webb County County Judge Mercurio Martinez, Jr.). The Kingdom of Zapata. Austin, Texas, Eakin Press.
