= Zapata High School =

Public school in Texas, United States

Location
- 2009 Hwy 16; Zapata, Texas 78076; United States
- Coordinates: 26.92543°N 99.24729°W

Information
- School type: Public High School
- School district: Zapata County Independent School District
- Principal: Nancy Garza
- Teaching staff: 71.22 (FTE)
- Grades: 9-12
- Enrollment: 1,068 (2023–2024)
- Student to teacher ratio: 15.00
- Colors: Maroon & Gold
- Athletics conference: UIL Class AAAA
- Mascot: Hawk/Lady Hawk
- Website: zhs.zcisd.org

Zapata High School is a public high school located in Zapata, Texas (USA) and classified as a 4A school by the UIL. It is part of the Zapata County Independent School District located in central Zapata County. In 2015, the school was rated "Met Standard" by the Texas Education Agency.

Its boundary parallels that of Zapata County.

== Athletics ==
The Zapata Hawks compete in these sports: JROTC, cross country, volleyball, basketball, powerlifting, soccer, golf, tennis, track, softball, and baseball.
