= Falcon Mesa, Texas =

- CDP
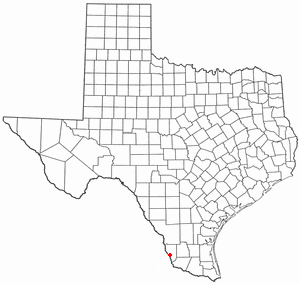
- Location of Falcon Mesa, Texas

- Coordinates: 26°52′22″N 99°17′20″W
- Country: United States
- State: Texas
- County: Zapata

Area
  - Total: 3.46 sq mi (9.0 km^{2})
  - Land: 1.52 sq mi (3.9 km^{2})
  - Water: 1.94 sq mi (5.0 km^{2})
- Elevation: 367 ft (112 m)

Population (2020)
  - Total: 523
  - Density: 344/sq mi (133/km^{2})
- Time zone: UTC-6 (Central (CST))
  - Summer (DST): UTC-5 (CDT)
- Zip Code: 78076
- FIPS code: 48-25352
- GNIS feature ID: 1335665

Falcon Mesa is a census-designated place (CDP) in Zapata County, Texas, United States. The population was 523 at the 2020 census.

== Geography ==
Falcon Mesa is located near the mouth of the Rio Salado (de los Nadadores), at 26°52′22″N 99°17′20″W (26.872812, -99.288953).

According to the United States Census Bureau, the CDP has a total area of 3.46 square miles (9.0 km^{2}), of which 1.52 square miles (3.9 km^{2}) is land and 1.94 square miles (5.0 km^{2}) is water.

== Demographics ==
Historical population
Census	Pop.	Note	%±
2000	506		—
2010	405		−20.0%
2020	523		29.1%
U.S. Decennial Census; 1850–1900 1910; 1920 1930 1940; 1950 1960 1970; 1980 1990 2000; 2010 2020

Falcon Mesa first appeared as a census designated place in the 2000 U.S. census.

=== 2020 census ===
Falcon Mesa CDP, Texas – Racial and ethnic composition Note: the US Census treats Hispanic/Latino as an ethnic category. This table excludes Latinos from the racial categories and assigns them to a separate category. Hispanics/Latinos may be of any race.
Race / Ethnicity (NH = Non-Hispanic)	Pop 2000	Pop 2010	Pop 2020	% 2000	% 2010	% 2020
White alone (NH)	343	145	133	67.79%	35.80%	25.43%
Black or African American alone (NH)	2	2	1	0.40%	0.49%	0.19%
Native American or Alaska Native alone (NH)	2	0	0	0.40%	0.00%	0.00%
Asian alone (NH)	1	10	0	0.20%	2.47%	0.00%
Native Hawaiian or Pacific Islander alone (NH)	0	0	0	0.00%	0.00%	0.00%
Other Race alone (NH)	0	0	0	0.00%	0.00%	0.00%
Mixed race or Multiracial (NH)	3	1	3	0.59%	0.25%	0.57%
Hispanic or Latino (any race)	155	247	386	30.63%	60.99%	73.80%
Total	506	405	523	100.00%	100.00%	100.00%

As of the census of 2000, there were 506 people, 242 households, and 168 families residing in the CDP. The population density was 331.1 inhabitants per square mile (127.8/km^{2}). There were 546 housing units at an average density of 357.3 units per square mile (138.0 units/km^{2}). The racial makeup of the CDP was 91.50% White, 0.40% African American, 0.40% Native American, 0.20% Asian, 5.93% from other races, and 1.58% from two or more races. Hispanic or Latino of any race were 30.63% of the population.

There were 242 households, out of which 13.6% had children under the age of 18 living with them, 65.3% were married couples living together, 3.7% had a female householder with no husband present, and 30.2% were non-families. 28.1% of all households were made up of individuals, and 22.7% had someone living alone who was 65 years of age or older. The average household size was 2.09 and the average family size was 2.51.

In the CDP, the population was spread out, with 14.0% under the age of 18, 4.3% from 18 to 24, 12.3% from 25 to 44, 24.9% from 45 to 64, and 44.5% who were 65 years of age or older. The median age was 62 years. For every 100 females, there were 99.2 males. For every 100 females age 18 and over, there were 95.1 males.

The median income for a household in the CDP was $24,792, and the median income for a family was $26,645. Males had a median income of $16,250 versus $48,021 for females. The per capita income for the CDP was $12,150. About 19.8% of families and 21.0% of the population were below the poverty line, including 25.5% of those under age 18 and 15.0% of those age 65 or over.

== Education ==
All of Zapata County is a part of the Zapata County Independent School District.
