= National Register of Historic Places listings in Zapata County, Texas =

Location of Zapata County in Texas

This is a list of the National Register of Historic Places listings in Zapata County, Texas.

This is intended to be a complete list of properties and districts listed on the National Register of Historic Places in Zapata County, Texas. There are two districts and four individual properties listed on the National Register in the county. One property is a National Historic Landmark and is part of a historic district. This property is also a Recorded Texas Historic Landmark.

This National Park Service list is complete through NPS recent listings posted March 21, 2025.

== Current listings ==
The publicly disclosed locations of National Register properties and districts may be seen in a mapping service provided.

	Name on the Register	Image	Date listed	Location	City or town	Description
1	Corralitos Ranch		August 2, 1977 (#77001483)	2 mi (3.2 km). N of San Ygnacio off U.S. 83; 27°07′10″N 99°25′50″W	San Ygnacio	
2	Dolores Nuevo	Dolores Nuevo	November 27, 1973 (#73001986)	Address restricted	Laredo	
3	Dolores Viejo	Dolores Viejo	August 17, 1973 (#73001987)	Address restricted	San Ygnacio	
4	San Francisco Ranch		March 25, 1977 (#77001484)	1 mi (1.6 km). N of San Ygnacio; 27°04′53″N 99°25′48″W	San Ygnacio	
5	San Ygnacio Historic District	San Ygnacio Historic District	July 16, 1973 (#73001988)	Town of San Ygnacio; 27°02′44″N 99°26′34″W	San Ygnacio	
6	Trevino-Uribe Rancho	Trevino-Uribe Rancho	July 16, 1973 (#73002342)	Jct. of Uribe and Trevino Sts. 27°02′42″N 99°26′36″W	San Ygnacio	Recorded Texas Historic Landmark, part of San Ygnacio Historic District

== See also ==
- National Register of Historic Places listings in Texas
- List of National Historic Landmarks in Texas
- Recorded Texas Historic Landmarks in Zapata County
