= Los Lobos, Texas =

- CDP
- Interactive map of Los Lobos, Texas
- Coordinates: 26°36′24″N 99°9′41″W
- Country: United States
- State: Texas
- County: Zapata

Area
  - Total: 0.1 sq mi (0.26 km^{2})
  - Land: 0.1 sq mi (0.26 km^{2})
  - Water: 0.0 sq mi (0 km^{2})

Population (2020)
  - Total: 7
  - Density: 70/sq mi (27/km^{2})
- Time zone: UTC-6 (Central (CST))
  - Summer (DST): UTC-5 (CDT)
- Zip Code: 78564
- FIPS code: 4844142

Los Lobos is a census-designated place (CDP) in Zapata County, Texas, United States. It was a new CDP for the 2010 census. As of the 2020 census, Los Lobos had a population of 7.

== Geography ==
Los Lobos is located at 26°36′24″N 99°9′41″W (26.606536, -99.161264). The CDP has a total area of 0.1 square miles (0.26 km^{2}), all land.

== Demographics ==
Historical population
Census	Pop.	Note	%±
2010	9		—
2020	7		−22.2%
U.S. Decennial Census; 1850–1900 1910; 1920 1930 1940; 1950 1960 1970; 1980 1990 2000; 2010 2020

Los Lobos first appeared as a census designated place in the 2010 U.S. census.

=== 2020 census ===
Los Lobos CDP, Texas – Racial and ethnic composition Note: the US Census treats Hispanic/Latino as an ethnic category. This table excludes Latinos from the racial categories and assigns them to a separate category. Hispanics/Latinos may be of any race.
Race / Ethnicity (NH = Non-Hispanic)	Pop 2010	Pop 2020	% 2010	% 2020
White alone (NH)	9	6	100.00%	85.71%
Black or African American alone (NH)	0	0	0.00%	0.00%
Native American or Alaska Native alone (NH)	0	0	0.00%	0.00%
Asian alone (NH)	0	0	0.00%	0.00%
Native Hawaiian or Pacific Islander alone (NH)	0	0	0.00%	0.00%
Other race alone (NH)	0	0	0.00%	0.00%
Mixed race or Multiracial (NH)	0	1	0.00%	14.29%
Hispanic or Latino (any race)	0	0	0.00%	0.00%
Total	9	7	100.00%	100.00%
