= Morales-Sanchez, Texas =

- CDP
- Location within the state of Texas
- Coordinates: 26°47′15″N 99°6′53″W
- Country: United States
- State: Texas
- County: Zapata

Area
  - Total: 1.4 sq mi (3.6 km^{2})
  - Land: 1.4 sq mi (3.6 km^{2})
  - Water: 0.0 sq mi (0 km^{2})

Population (2020)
  - Total: 46
  - Density: 33/sq mi (13/km^{2})
- Time zone: UTC-6 (Central (CST))
  - Summer (DST): UTC-5 (CDT)
- Zip Code: 78076
- FIPS code: 48-49314

Morales-Sanchez is a census-designated place (CDP) in Zapata County, Texas, United States. As of the 2020 census, Morales-Sanchez had a population of 46.

== Geography ==
Morales-Sanchez is located at 26°47′15″N 99°6′53″W (26.787616, -99.114689). According to the United States Census Bureau, the CDP has a total area of 1.4 square miles (3.6 km^{2}), all land.

== Demographics ==
Historical population
| Census | Pop. | Note | %± |
|---|---|---|---|
| 2000 | 95 | | — |
| 2010 | 84 | | −11.6% |
| 2020 | 46 | | −45.2% |
U.S. Decennial Census; 1850–1900 1910; 1920 1930 1940; 1950 1960 1970; 1980 1990 2000; 2010 2020

Morales-Sanchez first appeared as a census designated place in the 2000 U.S. census.

=== 2020 census ===
Morales-Sanchez CDP, Texas – Racial and ethnic composition Note: the US Census treats Hispanic/Latino as an ethnic category. This table excludes Latinos from the racial categories and assigns them to a separate category. Hispanics/Latinos may be of any race.
| Race / Ethnicity (NH = Non-Hispanic) | Pop 2000 | Pop 2010 | Pop 2020 | % 2000 | % 2010 | % 2020 |
|---|---|---|---|---|---|---|
| White alone (NH) | 8 | 6 | 3 | 8.42% | 7.14% | 6.52% |
| Black or African American alone (NH) | 0 | 0 | 1 | 0.00% | 0.00% | 2.17% |
| Native American or Alaska Native alone (NH) | 0 | 0 | 0 | 0.00% | 0.00% | 0.00% |
| Asian alone (NH) | 0 | 0 | 0 | 0.00% | 0.00% | 0.00% |
| Native Hawaiian or Pacific Islander alone (NH) | 0 | 0 | 0 | 0.00% | 0.00% | 0.00% |
| Other Race alone (NH) | 0 | 0 | 0 | 0.00% | 0.00% | 0.00% |
| Mixed race or Multiracial (NH) | 0 | 0 | 0 | 0.00% | 0.00% | 0.00% |
| Hispanic or Latino (any race) | 87 | 78 | 42 | 91.58% | 92.86% | 91.30% |
| Total | 95 | 84 | 46 | 100.00% | 100.00% | 100.00% |

As of the census of 2000, there were 95 people, 35 households, and 26 families residing in the CDP. The population density was 26.3 inhabitants per square mile (10.2/km^{2}). There were 74 housing units at an average density of 20.5/sq mi (7.9/km^{2}). The racial makeup of the CDP was 96.84% White, 3.16% from other races. Hispanic or Latino of any race were 91.58% of the population.

There were 35 households, out of which 25.7% had children under the age of 18 living with them, 62.9% were married couples living together, 11.4% had a female householder with no husband present, and 25.7% were non-families. 22.9% of all households were made up of individuals, and 17.1% had someone living alone who was 65 years of age or older. The average household size was 2.71 and the average family size was 3.23.

In the CDP, the population was spread out, with 21.1% under the age of 18, 10.5% from 18 to 24, 16.8% from 25 to 44, 27.4% from 45 to 64, and 24.2% who were 65 years of age or older. The median age was 48 years. For every 100 females, there were 93.9 males. For every 100 females age 18 and over, there were 108.3 males.

The median income for a household in the CDP was $20,313, and the median income for a family was $20,417. Males had a median income of $0 versus $0 for females. The per capita income for the CDP was $7,485. There were no families and 10.9% of the population living below the poverty line, including no under eighteens and 26.3% of those over 64.
