= Ramireno, Texas =

- CDP
- Interactive map of Ramireno, Texas
- Coordinates: 27°0′46″N 99°22′39″W
- Country: United States
- State: Texas
- County: Zapata

Area
  - Total: 1.5 sq mi (3.9 km^{2})
  - Land: 1.5 sq mi (3.9 km^{2})
  - Water: 0.0 sq mi (0 km^{2})

Population (2020)
  - Total: 6
  - Density: 4.0/sq mi (1.5/km^{2})
- Time zone: UTC-6 (Central (CST))
  - Summer (DST): UTC-5 (CDT)
- Zip Code: 78067
- FIPS code: 4860380

Ramireno is a census-designated place (CDP) in Zapata County, Texas, United States. As of the 2020 census, Ramireno had a population of 6. This was a new CDP for the 2010 census.

== History ==
The community was located on land granted to Don José Luis Ramírez by the King of Spain in 1784, part of the colonization effort of Col. José de Escandón. Ramírez, resident of Revilla (now Guerrero), Nuevo Santander (now Tamaulipas), along with his wife María Bacilia Martínez, and their children moved across the Rio Grande and established a home on their land in present Zapata County. They had ten children, and their families and descendants formed the nucleus of the community of Ramireño.

== Geography ==
Ramireno is located at 27°0′46″N 99°22′39″W (). The CDP has a total area of 1.5 square miles (3.9 km^{2}), all land.

== Demographics ==
Historical population
Census	Pop.	Note	%±
2010	35		—
2020	6		−82.9%
U.S. Decennial Census; 1850–1900 1910; 1920 1930 1940; 1950 1960 1970; 1980 1990 2000; 2010 2020

Ramireno first appeared as a census designated place in the 2010 U.S. census.

=== 2020 census ===
Ramireno CDP, Texas – Racial and ethnic composition Note: the US Census treats Hispanic/Latino as an ethnic category. This table excludes Latinos from the racial categories and assigns them to a separate category. Hispanics/Latinos may be of any race.
Race / Ethnicity (NH = Non-Hispanic)	Pop 2010	Pop 2020	% 2010	% 2020
White alone (NH)	1	0	2.86%	0.00%
Black or African American alone (NH)	0	0	0.00%	0.00%
Native American or Alaska Native alone (NH)	0	0	0.00%	0.00%
Asian alone (NH)	0	0	0.00%	0.00%
Native Hawaiian or Pacific Islander alone (NH)	0	0	0.00%	0.00%
Other race alone (NH)	0	0	0.00%	0.00%
Mixed race or Multiracial (NH)	0	0	0.00%	0.00%
Hispanic or Latino (any race)	34	6	97.14%	100.00%
Total	35	6	100.00%	100.00%
