= Trevino–Uribe Rancho =

Historic house in Texas, United States

- U.S. National Register of Historic Places
- U.S. National Historic Landmark
- Recorded Texas Historic Landmark
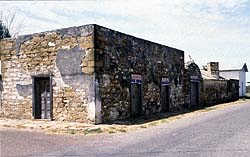
- Jesus Trevino Fort, San Ygnacio, Texas photo: Mario Sanchez

- Location within Texas Location within the United States
- Location: Jct. of Uribe and Trevino Sts., San Ygnacio, Texas
- Coordinates: 27°2′42″N 99°26′36″W
- Area: less than one acre
- Built: 1851
- Architect: Jesus Trevino and Blas Maria Uribe
- Architectural style: Spanish Colonial
- NRHP reference No.: 73002342
- RTHL No.: 5556

Significant dates
- Added to NRHP: July 16, 1973
- Designated NHL: August 6, 1998
- Designated RTHL: 1964

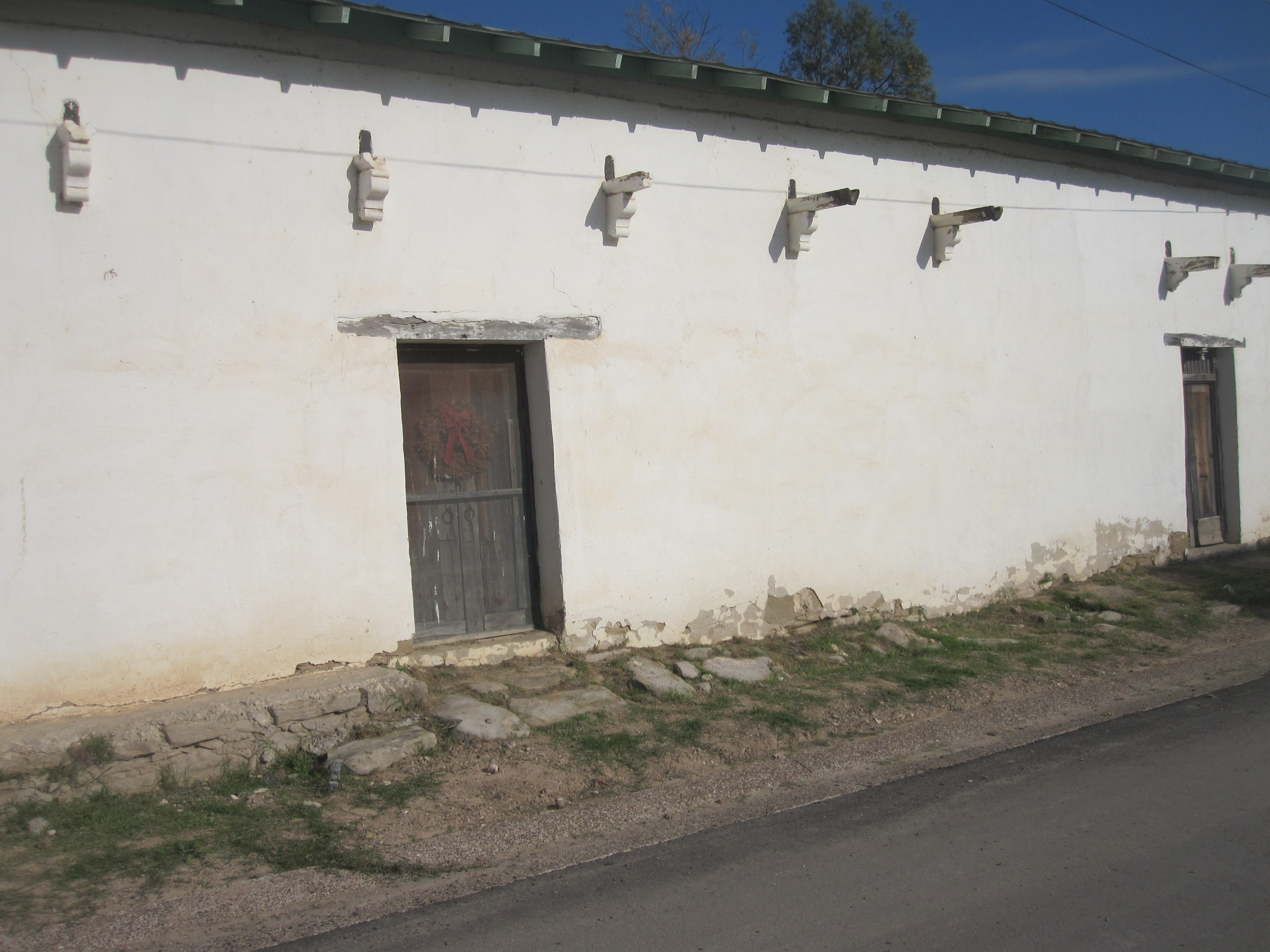
Trevino Ranch

The Treviño–Uribe Rancho is a historic fortified home at the junction of Trevino and Uribe Streets in the small frontier town of San Ygnacio, Texas. With a construction history dating to 1830, it is one of the oldest surviving buildings from the period of Spanish-Mexican settlement of the north bank of the lower Rio Grande. The building was designated a National Historic Landmark in 1998.

== Description and history ==
The Treviño–Uribe Rancho is a multiroom sandstone structure, its chambers arranged in an L shape, with thick stone walls forming an enclosed rectangular compound. It sits on a bluff overlooking the Rio Grande to the west. There are no windows as such on the outside, only loopholes through which defenders might fire at attackers, and the main entrance to the compound is a fortified arched gateway with heavy double doors. The chambers of the house are reflective of multiple building campaigns in the 19th century, retaining many original features.

The San Ygnacio area was in the 18th century part of a large Spanish colonial land grant, extending on both sides of the Rio Grande. Early ranchos were established on the south bank of the Rio Grande, one of which, called Revilla (and later supplanted by present-day Guerrero), was across the river from the site of San Ygnacio. Jesus Treviño, a wealthy landowner from Revilla, purchased acreage on the north bank of the Rio Grande, and built a single-chamber stone structure in 1830, which is the oldest surviving portion of the rancho.

This structure was probably not a permanent habitation, but was likely intended as shelter from the elements and Native American attacks. Treviño's son-in-law, Blas Maria Uribe, added to this structure in building campaigns between 1851 and 1871, which transformed it into the compound seen today. One of its features is a native stone made into a polished sundial and set into the north wall of the fort.

A substantial number of 19th-century fortified homes similar to this one were lost in the 20th century with the construction of the Falcon International Reservoir.

== See also ==
- National Register of Historic Places listings in Zapata County, Texas
- List of National Historic Landmarks in Texas
- Recorded Texas Historic Landmarks in Zapata County
