= Medina, Zapata County, Texas =

Medina, Texas
- CDP
- Location within the state of Texas
- Coordinates: 26°55′16″N 99°15′34″W
- Country: United States
- State: Texas
- County: Zapata

Area
  - Total: 1.8 sq mi (4.6 km^{2})
  - Land: 1.8 sq mi (4.6 km^{2})
  - Water: 0 sq mi (0.0 km^{2})
- Elevation: 397 ft (121 m)

Population (2010)
  - Total: 3,935
  - Density: 2,200/sq mi (860/km^{2})
- Time zone: UTC-6 (Central (CST))
  - Summer (DST): UTC-5 (CDT)
- Zip Code: 78076
- FIPS code: 48-47406
- GNIS feature ID: 1852735

Medina is a census-designated place (CDP) in Zapata County, Texas, United States. The population was 3,935 at the 2010 census.

== Geography ==
Medina is located at 26°55′16″N 99°15′34″W (26.93545, -99.264707).

According to the United States Census Bureau, the CDP has a total area of 1.8 square miles (4.6 km^{2}), of which 1.8 square miles (4.6 km^{2}) is land and 0.56% is water.

== Demographics ==
Historical population
| Census | Pop. | Note | %± |
|---|---|---|---|
| 2000 | 2,960 | | — |
| 2010 | 3,935 | | 32.9% |
| 2020 | 3,953 | | 0.5% |
U.S. Decennial Census; 1850–1900 1910; 1920 1930 1940; 1950 1960 1970; 1980 1990 2000; 2010 2020

Medina first appeared as a census designated place in the 2000 U.S. census.

=== 2020 census ===
Medina CDP, Texas – Racial and ethnic composition Note: the US Census treats Hispanic/Latino as an ethnic category. This table excludes Latinos from the racial categories and assigns them to a separate category. Hispanics/Latinos may be of any race.
| Race / Ethnicity (NH = Non-Hispanic) | Pop 2000 | Pop 2010 | Pop 2020 | % 2000 | % 2010 | % 2020 |
|---|---|---|---|---|---|---|
| White alone (NH) | 183 | 78 | 82 | 6.18% | 1.98% | 2.07% |
| Black or African American alone (NH) | 2 | 7 | 3 | 0.07% | 0.18% | 0.08% |
| Native American or Alaska Native alone (NH) | 2 | 2 | 2 | 0.07% | 0.05% | 0.05% |
| Asian alone (NH) | 0 | 0 | 3 | 0.00% | 0.00% | 0.08% |
| Native Hawaiian or Pacific Islander alone (NH) | 0 | 0 | 0 | 0.00% | 0.00% | 0.00% |
| Other race alone (NH) | 0 | 0 | 0 | 0.00% | 0.00% | 0.00% |
| Mixed race or Multiracial (NH) | 5 | 4 | 3 | 0.17% | 0.10% | 0.08% |
| Hispanic or Latino (any race) | 2,768 | 3,844 | 3,860 | 93.51% | 97.69% | 97.65% |
| Total | 2,960 | 3,935 | 3,953 | 100.00% | 100.00% | 100.00% |

As of the 2020 United States census, there were 3,953 people, 1,299 households, and 1,099 families residing in the CDP.

=== 2000 census ===
At the 2000 census, there were 2,960 people, 797 households and 706 families residing in the CDP. The population density was 1,675.2 per square mile (645.7/km^{2}). There were 999 housing units at an average density of 565.4 per square mile (218.3/km^{2}). The racial makeup of the CDP was 81.96% White, 0.30% African American, 0.41% Native American, 0.20% Asian, 0.03% Pacific Islander, 14.80% from other races, and 2.30% from two or more races. Hispanic or Latino of any race were 93.5% of the population.

There were 797 households, of which 63.4% had children under the age of 18 living with them, 68.8% were married couples living together, 15.1% had a female householder with no husband present, and 11.3% were non-families. 10.5% of all households were made up of individuals, and 4.9% had someone living alone who was 65 years of age or older. The average household size was 3.71 and the average family size was 3.99.

42.7% of the population were under the age of 18, 11.4% from 18 to 24, 27.4% from 25 to 44, 12.0% from 45 to 64, and 6.5% who were 65 years of age or older. The median age was 22 years. For every 100 females, there were 98.4 males. For every 100 females age 18 and over, there were 94.4 males.

The median household income was $24,453 and the median family income was $25,576. Males had a median income of $19,593 versus $13,583 for females. The per capita income for the CDP was $6,342. About 38.2% of families and 48.1% of the population were below the poverty line, including 55.9% of those under age 18 and 26.3% of those age 65 or over.
