= Zapata County, Texas =

County in Texas, United States

- County
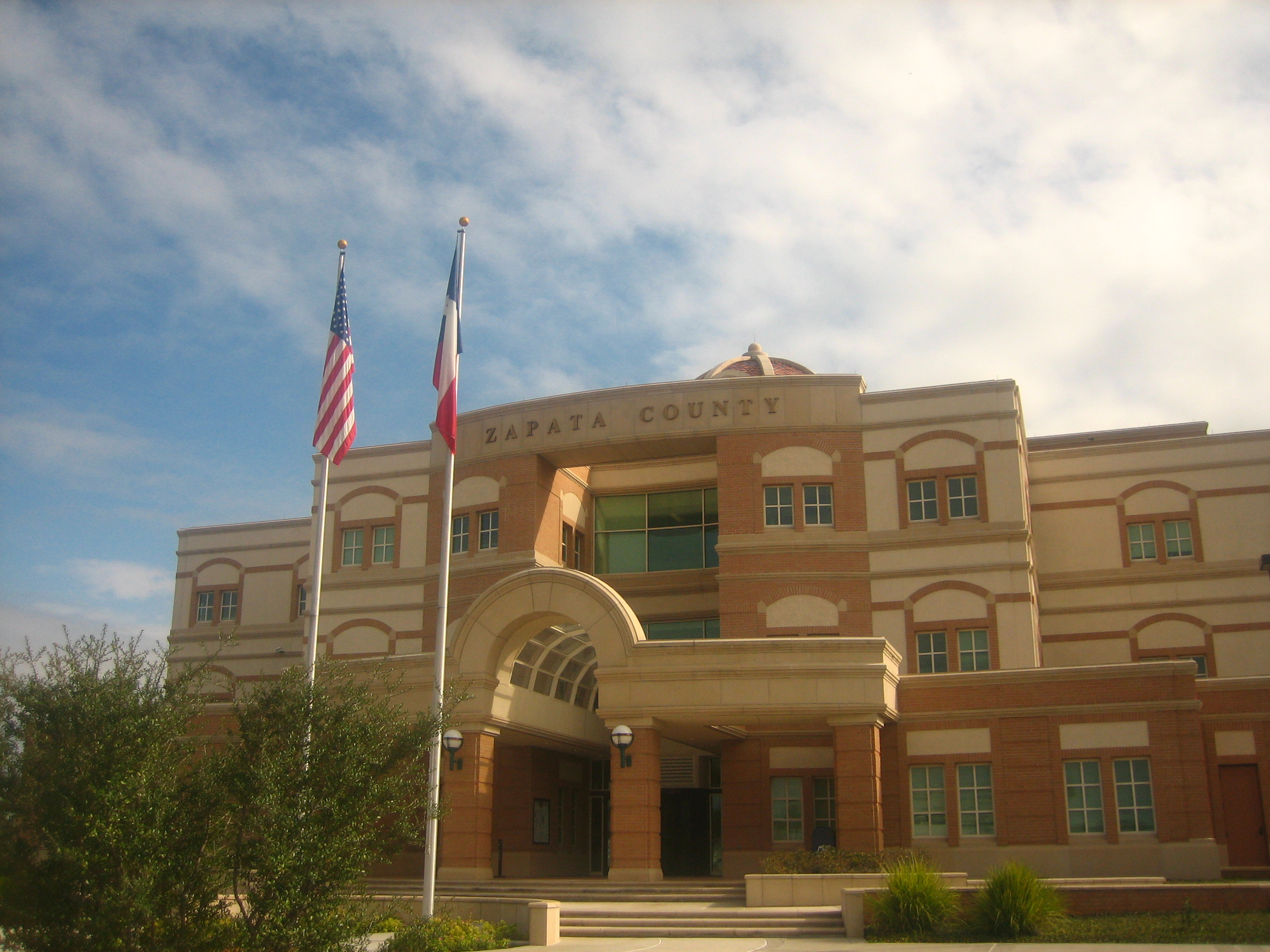
- The front of the Zapata County Courthouse

- Location within the U.S. state of Texas
- Coordinates: 27°00′N 99°11′W
- Country: United States
- State: Texas
- Founded: January 22, 1858
- Named for: Colonel José Antonio de Zapata
- Seat: Zapata
- Largest community: Zapata

Area
  - Total: 1,058 sq mi (2,740 km^{2})
  - Land: 998 sq mi (2,580 km^{2})
  - Water: 60 sq mi (160 km^{2}) 5.6%

Population (2020)
  - Total: 13,889
  - Estimate (2025): 13,753 ▼
  - Density: 13.9/sq mi (5.37/km^{2})
- Time zone: UTC−6 (Central)
  - Summer (DST): UTC−5 (CDT)
- Congressional district: 28th
- Website: www.co.zapata.tx.us

Zapata County is a county located in the U.S. state of Texas. As of the 2020 census, its population was 13,889. Its county seat is Zapata. The county is east of the Mexico–United States border and is named for Colonel José Antonio de Zapata, a rancher in the area who rebelled against Mexico.

Zapata County comprises the Zapata, TX micropolitan statistical area.

The South Texas oil boom included wells drilled in Zapata County in the early 1920s through the work of Laredo industrialist Oliver Winfield Killam, a Missouri native who once served as an Oklahoma state legislator.

== Geography ==
According to the U.S. Census Bureau, the county has a total area of 1,058 square miles (2,740 km^{2}), of which 60 square miles (160 km^{2}) (5.6%) are covered by water. It is located in the Lower Rio Grande Valley, on the shore of Falcon International Reservoir. It was previously linked to Mexico by an international bridge, but this was flooded when the Falcon Dam and reservoir were built. It is now linked to Mexico by the Falcon Dam Port of Entry.

=== Major highways ===
- U.S. Highway 83
- State Highway 16

=== Adjacent counties and municipalities ===
- Webb County (north)
- Jim Hogg County (east)
- Starr County (southeast)
- Guerrero, Tamaulipas, Mexico (west)

=== National protected area ===
- Lower Rio Grande Valley National Wildlife Refuge (part)

== Demographics ==
Historical population
Census	Pop.	Note	%±
1860	1,248		—
1870	1,488		19.2%
1880	3,636		144.4%
1890	3,562		−2.0%
1900	4,760		33.6%
1910	3,809		−20.0%
1920	2,929		−23.1%
1930	2,867		−2.1%
1940	3,916		36.6%
1950	4,405		12.5%
1960	4,393		−0.3%
1970	4,352		−0.9%
1980	6,628		52.3%
1990	9,279		40.0%
2000	12,182		31.3%
2010	14,018		15.1%
2020	13,889		−0.9%
2025 (est.)	13,753	▼	−1.0%
U.S. Decennial Census; 1850–2010 2010–2020 2020

=== Racial and ethnic composition ===
Zapata County, Florida – Racial and ethnic composition Note: the US Census treats Hispanic/Latino as an ethnic category. This table excludes Latinos from the racial categories and assigns them to a separate category. Hispanics/Latinos may be of any race.
Race / Ethnicity (NH = Non-Hispanic)	Pop 1980	Pop 1990	Pop 2000	Pop 2010	Pop 2020	% 1980	% 1990	% 2000	% 2010	% 2020
White alone (NH)	1,572	1,726	1,771	861	796	23.72%	18.60%	14.54%	6.14%	5.73%
Black or African American alone (NH)	1	1	22	11	9	0.02%	0.01%	0.18%	0.08%	0.06%
Native American or Alaska Native alone (NH)	5	8	8	16	7	0.08%	0.09%	0.07%	0.11%	0.05%
Asian alone (NH)	4	3	17	28	16	0.06%	0.03%	0.14%	0.20%	0.12%
Native Hawaiian or Pacific Islander alone (NH)	x	x	1	0	0	x	x	0.01%	0.00%	0.00%
Other race alone (NH)	4	22	0	6	16	0.06%	0.24%	0.00%	0.04%	0.12%
Mixed race or Multiracial (NH)	x	x	35	12	46	x	x	0.29%	0.09%	0.33%
Hispanic or Latino (any race)	5,042	7,519	10,328	13,084	12,999	76.07%	81.03%	84.78%	93.34%	93.59%
Total	6,628	9,279	12,182	14,018	13,889	100.00%	100.00%	100.00%	100.00%	100.00%

=== 2020 census ===
As of the 2020 census, 13,889 people, 4,536 households, and 3,254 families lived in the county. The median age was 32.8 years; 30.9% of residents were under the age of 18 and 14.5% were 65 years of age or older. For every 100 females there were 100.6 males, and for every 100 females age 18 and over there were 96.0 males age 18 and over.

The racial makeup of the county was 39.0% White, 0.1% Black or African American, 0.5% American Indian and Alaska Native, 0.1% Asian, <0.1% Native Hawaiian and Pacific Islander, 14.7% from some other race, and 45.5% from two or more races. Hispanic or Latino residents of any race comprised 93.6% of the population.

78.8% of residents lived in urban areas, while 21.2% lived in rural areas.

Of the 4,536 households in the county, 43.3% had children under the age of 18 living in them. Of all households, 49.4% were married-couple households, 17.9% were households with a male householder and no spouse or partner present, and 28.0% were households with a female householder and no spouse or partner present. About 23.2% of all households were made up of individuals and 11.6% had someone living alone who was 65 years of age or older.

There were 6,159 housing units, of which 26.4% were vacant. Among occupied housing units, 78.8% were owner-occupied and 21.2% were renter-occupied. The homeowner vacancy rate was 2.1% and the rental vacancy rate was 11.9%.

=== 2000 census ===
As of the 2000 census, 12,182 people, 3,921 households, and 3,164 families resided in the county. Zapata County is estimated to be the 11th-fastest growing county (+15.8%) in Texas since 2000 (based on percentage of population change). The population density was 12 people per square mile (4.6 people/km^{2}). The 6,167 housing units had an average density of 6 units per square mile (2.3 units/km^{2}). The racial makeup of the county was 84.07% White, 0.41% African American, 0.32% Native American, 0.19% Asian, 0.04% Pacific Islander, 12.64% from other races, and 2.33% from two or more races. About 84.78% of the population were Hispanics or Latinos of any race.

Of the 3,921 households, 43.2% had children under 18 living with them, 64.2% were married couples living together, 13.0% had a female householder with no husband present, and 19.3% were not families. About 17.5% of all households were made up of individuals, and 10.3% had someone living alone who was 65 or older. The average household size was 3.10 and the average family size was 3.52.

In the county, the age distribution was 33.0% under 18, 10.0% from 18 to 24, 24.1% from 25 to 44, 18.6% from 45 to 64, and 14.3% who were 65 or older. The median age was 31 years. For every 100 females, there were 96.8 males. For every 100 females 18 and over, there were 93.7 males.

The median income for a household in the county was $24,635 and for a family was $26,722. Males had a median income of $26,294 versus $14,579 for females. The per capita income for the county was $10,486. About 29.3% of families and 35.8% of the population were below the poverty line, including 46.1% of those under 18 and 21.3% of those 65 or over.

=== Religion ===
According to the 2020 US Census, Zapata County is 55% Catholic, 5.8% Evangelical Protestant, 2.4% Mormon, 1.5% Jehovah's Witnesses, 0.4% mainline Protestant, and 35.0% other or none.

== Government and politics ==
In the majority of U.S. presidential elections, Zapata County supported Democratic Party candidates, but on three occasions, it gave record-setting margins to Republican presidential nominees, when it delivered the highest percentage of the vote of any county in the nation to them. The first time was in 1896, when it gave 96.3% of the vote to William McKinley, though he lost Texas as a whole with 30.8% of the statewide popular vote, but won the national election with 51.0% of the nationwide popular vote. The second time was in 1908, when William Howard Taft won 99.1% of the vote in the county, despite losing the state to Democrat William Jennings Bryan and receiving just 22.4% of the statewide vote, but winning the national election with 51.6% of the nationwide popular vote. The last time was in 1912, when it again gave then-incumbent President Taft 80.9% of the vote, with it being his best county in the nation, but against the state and nation's preference for the Democratic victor Woodrow Wilson; in the popular vote, Taft only received 9.5% statewide and 23.2% nationwide.

It voted Republican for President in 1920 and then consistently voted Democratic until 2020, when Republican Donald Trump defeated Democrat Joe Biden 52% to 47%, about the same as the statewide margin. Zapata was the most Hispanic county to vote for Trump in 2020, as well as the county with the lowest non-Hispanic White population to do so. In 2024, this trend continued, with Trump receiving nearly 61% of the vote in the county. Zapata shifted to the right from 2012 to 2024 by 66%, representing the third-furthest such rightward shift for any county in the country, surpassed only by Starr County and Maverick County's respective shifts of 89% and 77%.

United States presidential election results for Zapata County, Texas
Year	Republican		Democratic		Third party(ies)	
Year	No.	%	No.	%	No.	%
1912	199	100.00%	0	0.00%	0	0.00%
1916	214	89.17%	26	10.83%	0	0.00%
1920	98	66.22%	50	33.78%	0	0.00%
1924	197	39.56%	300	60.24%	1	0.20%
1928	19	6.03%	296	93.97%	0	0.00%
1932	24	8.14%	271	91.86%	0	0.00%
1936	34	10.76%	282	89.24%	0	0.00%
1940	495	38.70%	784	61.30%	0	0.00%
1944	43	7.86%	501	91.59%	3	0.55%
1948	414	39.54%	632	60.36%	1	0.10%
1952	526	46.02%	616	53.89%	1	0.09%
1956	637	41.80%	886	58.14%	1	0.07%
1960	260	27.81%	675	72.19%	0	0.00%
1964	135	11.77%	1,009	87.97%	3	0.26%
1968	251	20.71%	909	75.00%	52	4.29%
1972	695	47.51%	768	52.49%	0	0.00%
1976	462	27.47%	1,216	72.29%	4	0.24%
1980	874	41.01%	1,218	57.16%	39	1.83%
1984	1,214	43.34%	1,577	56.30%	10	0.36%
1988	958	30.56%	2,171	69.25%	6	0.19%
1992	866	26.65%	2,052	63.16%	331	10.19%
1996	521	21.27%	1,786	72.90%	143	5.84%
2000	953	36.43%	1,638	62.61%	25	0.96%
2004	1,228	42.37%	1,662	57.35%	8	0.28%
2008	919	32.07%	1,939	67.66%	8	0.28%
2012	997	28.14%	2,527	71.32%	19	0.54%
2016	1,029	32.75%	2,063	65.66%	50	1.59%
2020	2,033	52.42%	1,826	47.09%	19	0.49%
2024	2,970	60.97%	1,877	38.53%	24	0.49%

United States Senate election results for Zapata County, Texas1
Year	Republican		Democratic		Third party(ies)	
Year	No.	%	No.	%	No.	%
2024	2,197	51.51%	1,957	45.89%	111	2.60%

United States Senate election results for Zapata County, Texas2
Year	Republican		Democratic		Third party(ies)	
Year	No.	%	No.	%	No.	%
2020	1,454	43.06%	1,821	53.92%	102	3.02%

Texas Gubernatorial election results for Zapata County
Year	Republican		Democratic		Third party(ies)	
Year	No.	%	No.	%	No.	%
2022	1,817	52.77%	1,585	46.04%	41	1.19%

== Education ==
All of Zapata County is a part of the Zapata County Independent School District. Residents are zoned to Laredo Community College.

== Communities ==
No incorporated areas are in Zapata County, hence no municipal governments.

=== Census-designated places ===
- Falcon Lake Estates
- Falcon Mesa
- Las Palmas
- Lopeño
- Los Lobos
- Medina
- Morales-Sanchez
- New Falcon
- Ramireno
- San Ygnacio
- Siesta Shores
- Zapata (county seat)

== Gallery ==
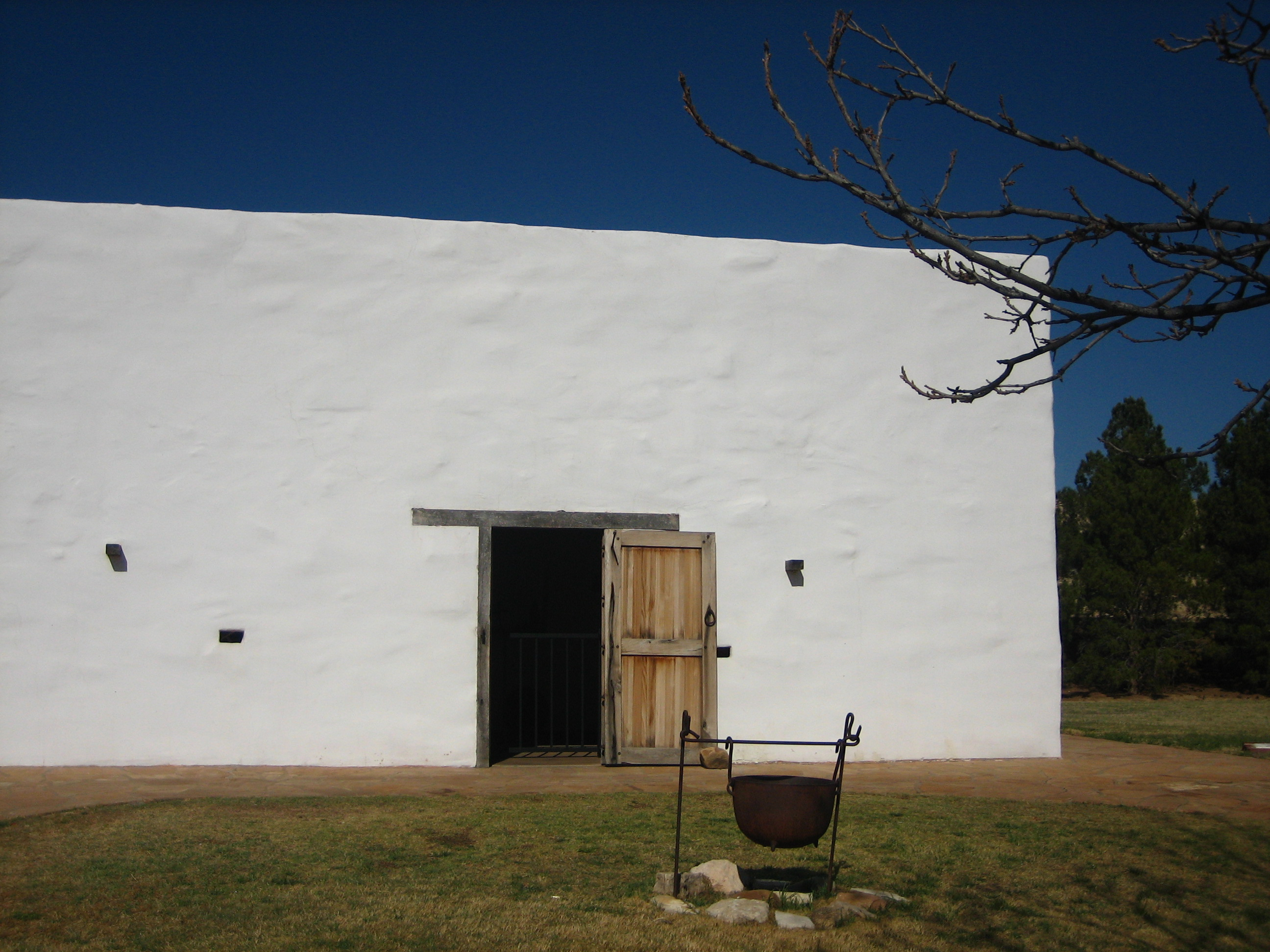
The 19th-century Los Corralitos Building relocated from Zapata County to the National Ranching Heritage Center in Lubbock in West Texas

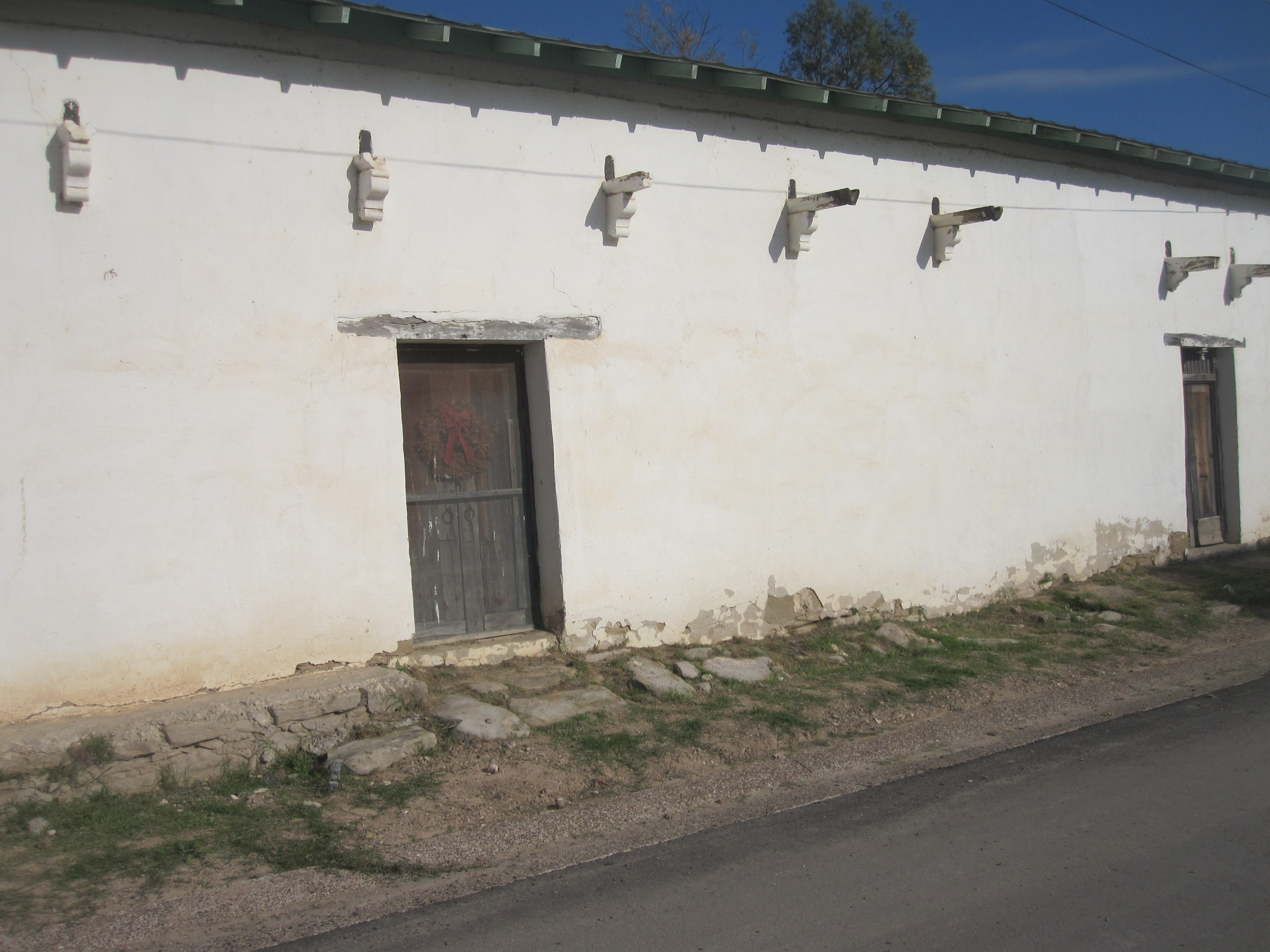
The western side of the Jesus Trevino Rancho building in the San Ygnacio Historic District, note the structural similarity to Los Corralitos Building

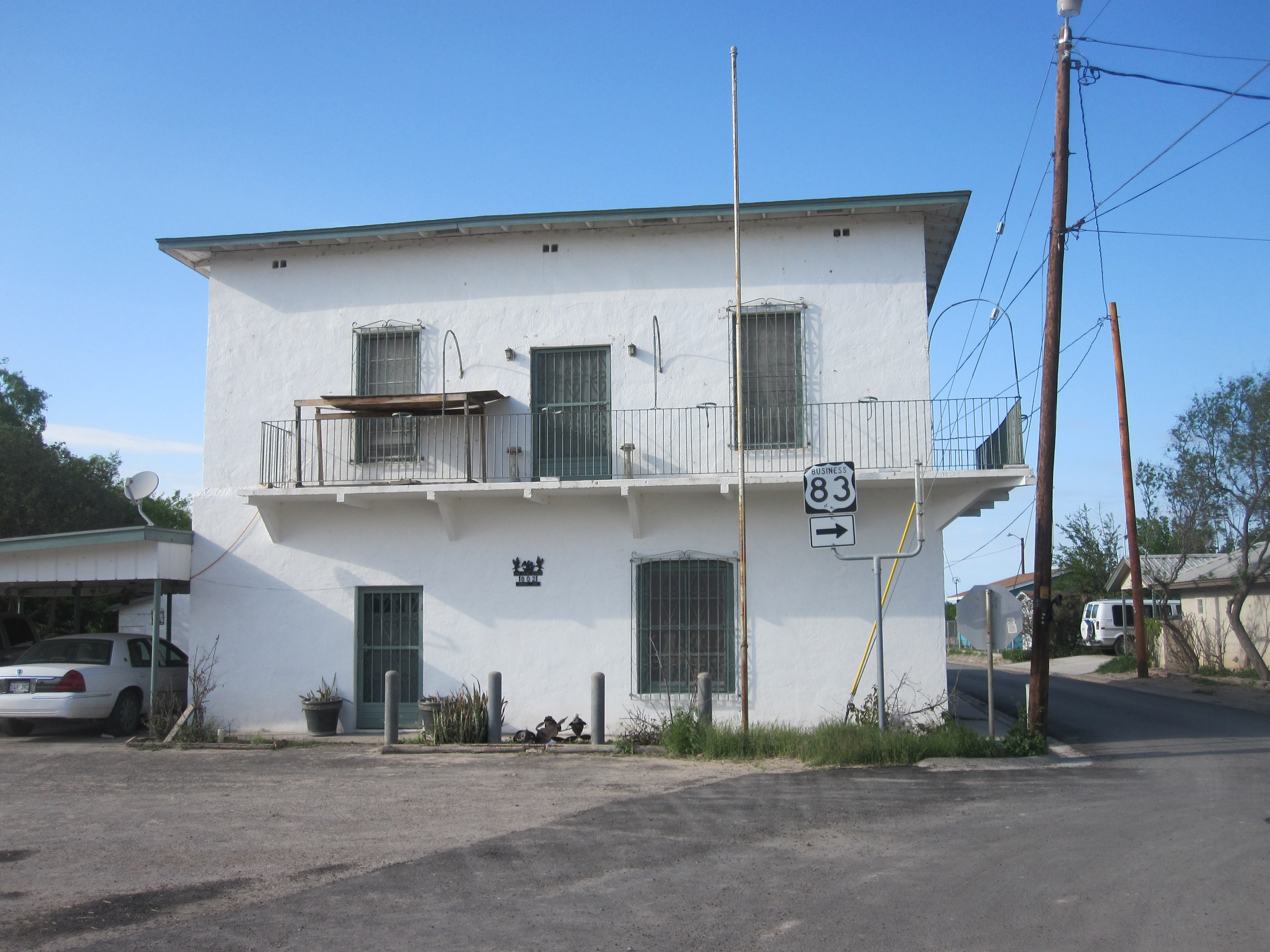
A two-story historic residence in San Ygnacio on U.S. Highway 83 business route

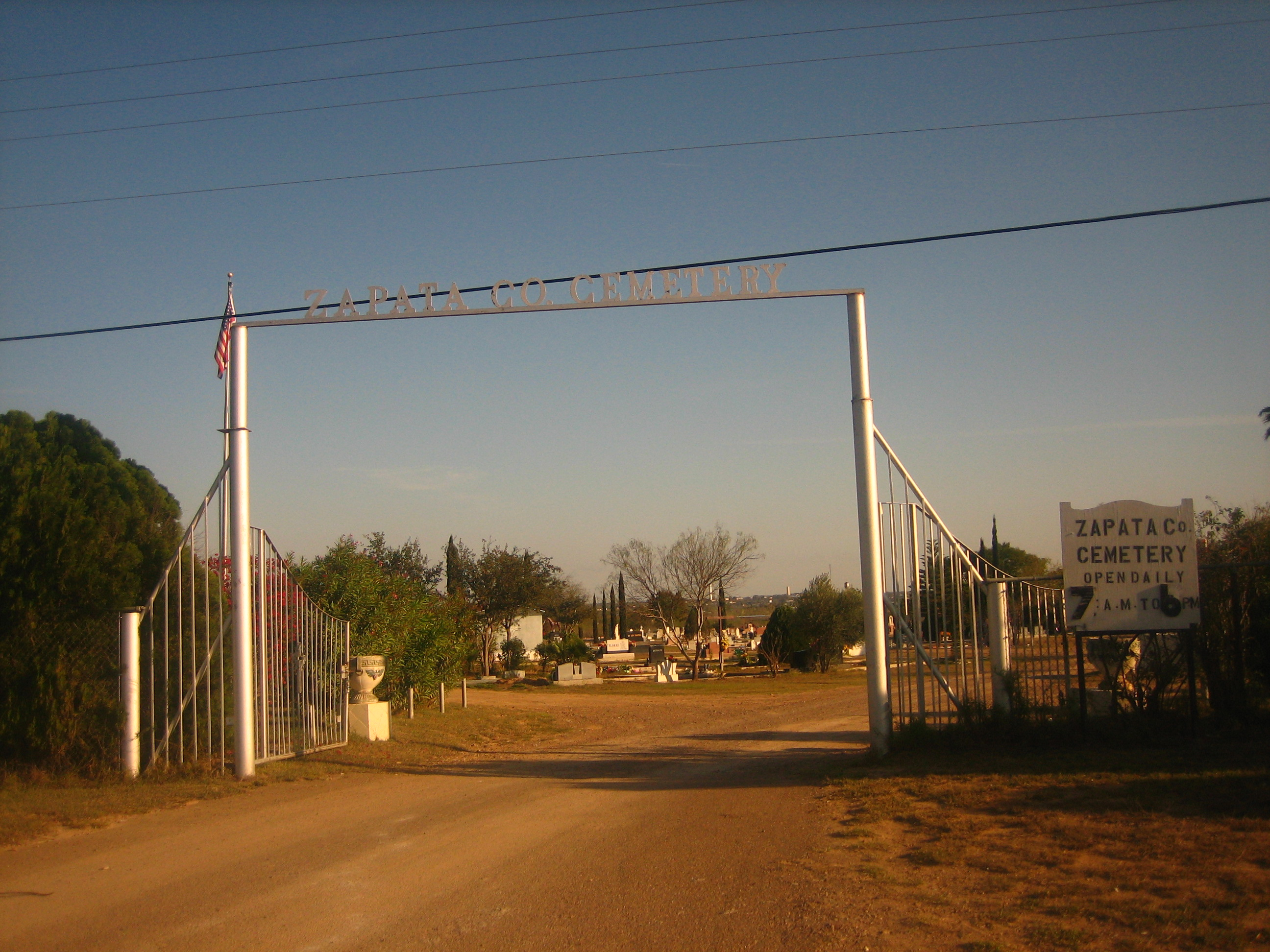
Entrance to Zapata County Cemetery from Farm-to-Market Road 496

== See also ==
- National Register of Historic Places listings in Zapata County, Texas
- Recorded Texas Historic Landmarks in Zapata County
