= Zapata, Texas =

- CDP
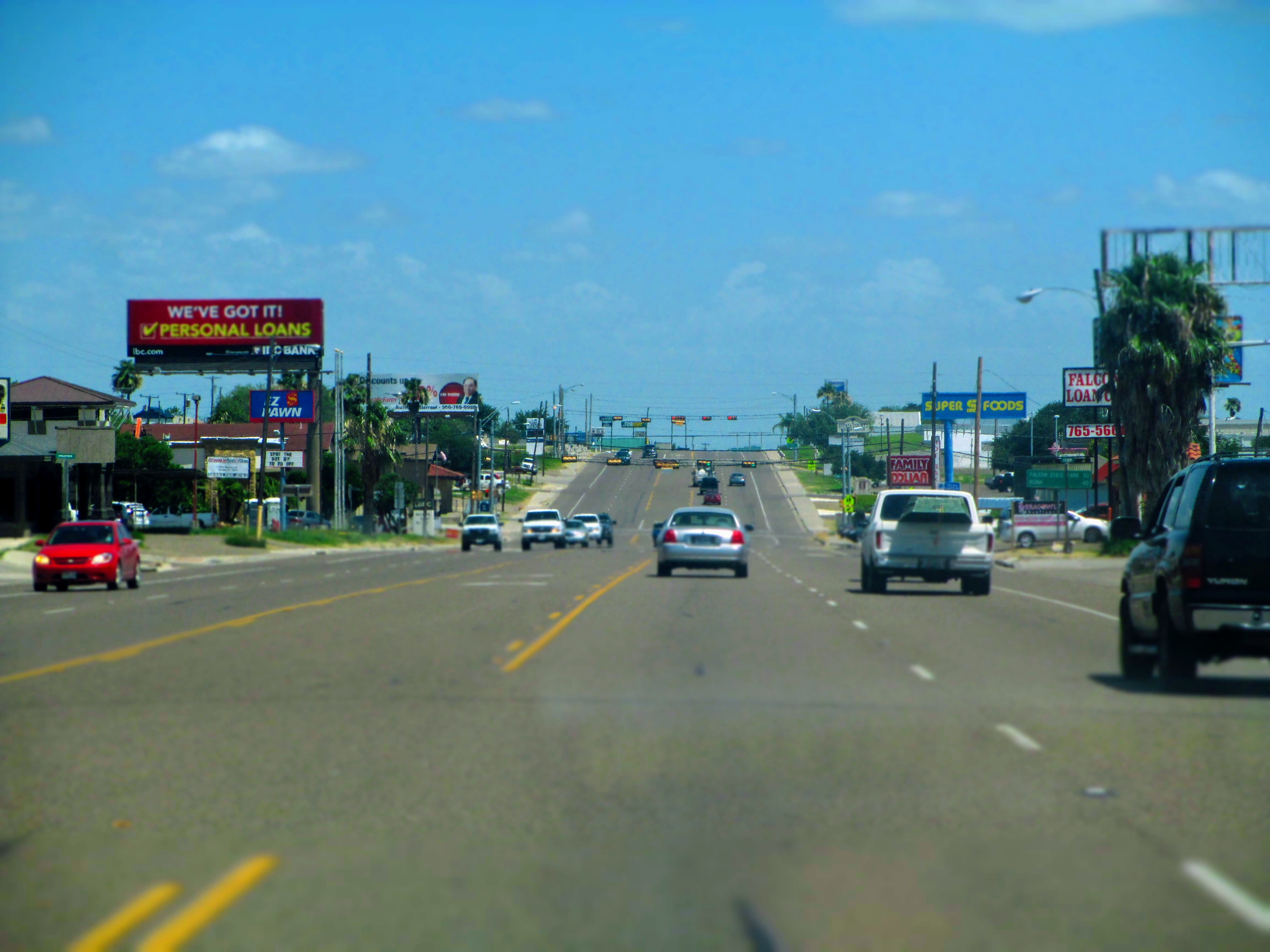
- U.S. Highway 83 in Zapata

- Location within Texas Location within the United States
- Coordinates: 26°54′22″N 99°16′12″W
- Country: United States
- State: Texas
- County: Zapata

Area
  - Total: 9.6 sq mi (25 km^{2})
  - Land: 7.6 sq mi (20 km^{2})
  - Water: 2.0 sq mi (5.2 km^{2})
- Elevation: 390 ft (120 m)

Population (2020)
  - Total: 5,383
  - Density: 710/sq mi (270/km^{2})
- Time zone: UTC-6 (Central (CST))
  - Summer (DST): UTC-5 (CDT)
- ZIP code: 78076
- Area code: 956
- FIPS code: 48-80716
- GNIS feature ID: 1350720

Zapata is a census-designated place (CDP) in and the county seat of Zapata County, Texas, United States. The population was 5,383 at the 2020 census. As an unincorporated community, Zapata has no municipal government, but like all 254 Texas counties has four elected county commissioners chosen by single-member districts and a countywide elected administrative judge.

== History ==
Zapata was named for José Antonio de Zapata (died 1839), the revolutionary commander who served in the cavalry of the Republic of the Rio Grande, of which the town was a part. The town was relocated to higher ground in 1953 prior to the completion of Falcon Dam, which left the original town center beneath the waters of Falcon Lake.

== Geography ==
According to the United States Census Bureau, the CDP has a total area of 9.6 square miles (25 km^{2}), of which 7.6 square miles (20 km^{2}) is land and 2.0 square miles (5.2 km^{2}) is water.

=== Climate ===
Zapata has a hot semi-arid climate (Köppen: BSh) with sweltering summers and warm winters. Official record temperatures range from 13 °F or −10.6 °C on January 4, 1911, to 116 °F or 46.7 °C on June 16, 1998.

Rainfall averages 19.8 in (500 mm) annually, with higher amounts typically occurring from May to October. The wettest calendar year has been 2004 with 35.34 inches or 897.6 millimetres and the driest 1974 with 11.63 inches or 295.4 millimetres. The wettest month has been September 1967 with 13.26 inches or 336.8 millimetres, whilst every month of the year has recorded a trace or less at least once and no rain whatsoever fell during the winter of 1950–51. Measurable snowfall has occurred only twice: 8.0 inches (0.20 m) on January 9, 1967 and 1.0 inch (0.025 m) on Christmas Day in 2004.

Zapata is sometimes the hottest location in the United States: on January 5, 1997 it set the all-time US record January high of 98 °F or 36.7 °C.

Climate data for Zapata, Texas
Month	Jan	Feb	Mar	Apr	May	Jun	Jul	Aug	Sep	Oct	Nov	Dec	Year
Record high °F (°C)	98 (37)	101 (38)	105 (41)	111 (44)	114 (46)	116 (47)	113 (45)	114 (46)	111 (44)	104 (40)	98 (37)	95 (35)	116 (47)
Mean maximum °F (°C)	87 (31)	91 (33)	96 (36)	101 (38)	103 (39)	104 (40)	104 (40)	105 (41)	102 (39)	96 (36)	91 (33)	85 (29)	107 (42)
Mean daily maximum °F (°C)	70.1 (21.2)	74.1 (23.4)	82.8 (28.2)	89.3 (31.8)	94.0 (34.4)	98.0 (36.7)	99.3 (37.4)	99.6 (37.6)	94.0 (34.4)	87.3 (30.7)	78.2 (25.7)	70.4 (21.3)	86.4 (30.2)
Daily mean °F (°C)	58.4 (14.7)	61.8 (16.6)	70.0 (21.1)	76.7 (24.8)	82.3 (27.9)	86.1 (30.1)	87.2 (30.7)	87.4 (30.8)	82.8 (28.2)	75.7 (24.3)	66.7 (19.3)	58.8 (14.9)	74.5 (23.6)
Mean daily minimum °F (°C)	46.7 (8.2)	49.5 (9.7)	57.1 (13.9)	64.1 (17.8)	70.5 (21.4)	74.3 (23.5)	75.2 (24.0)	75.1 (23.9)	71.5 (21.9)	64.2 (17.9)	55.1 (12.8)	47.3 (8.5)	62.6 (17.0)
Mean minimum °F (°C)	30 (−1)	34 (1)	40 (4)	49 (9)	60 (16)	67 (19)	71 (22)	70 (21)	62 (17)	49 (9)	39 (4)	32 (0)	28 (−2)
Record low °F (°C)	13 (−11)	22 (−6)	22 (−6)	38 (3)	50 (10)	50 (10)	42 (6)	64 (18)	45 (7)	30 (−1)	31 (−1)	15 (−9)	13 (−11)
Average rainfall inches (mm)	0.77 (20)	0.94 (24)	0.61 (15)	1.50 (38)	2.55 (65)	2.12 (54)	1.80 (46)	1.73 (44)	4.40 (112)	1.57 (40)	1.06 (27)	0.74 (19)	19.78 (502)
Average rainy days (≥ 0.01 inch)	4	4	3	3	4	4	4	4	6	4	3	4	48
Source: WRCC

== Demographics ==
Historical population
Year	Pop.	±%
1950	1,400	—
1960	2,031	+45.1%
1970	2,102	+3.5%
1980	3,831	+82.3%
1990	7,119	+85.8%
2000	4,856	−31.8%
2010	5,089	+4.8%
2020	5,383	+5.8%
U.S. Decennial Census; 1850–1900 1910 1920; 1930 1940 1950 1960; 1970 1980 1990 2000; 2010 2020

Zapata first appeared as an unincorporated community in the 1950 U.S. census; and then as a census designated place in the 1980 United States census.

=== 2020 census ===
Zapata CDP, Texas – Racial and ethnic composition Note: the US Census treats Hispanic/Latino as an ethnic category. This table excludes Latinos from the racial categories and assigns them to a separate category. Hispanics/Latinos may be of any race.
Race / Ethnicity (NH = Non-Hispanic)	Pop 2000	Pop 2010	Pop 2020	% 2000	% 2010	% 2020
White alone (NH)	501	235	267	10.32%	4.62%	4.96%
Black or African American alone (NH)	3	1	4	0.06%	0.02%	0.07%
Native American or Alaska Native alone (NH)	2	2	1	0.04%	0.04%	0.02%
Asian alone (NH)	3	8	5	0.06%	0.16%	0.09%
Native Hawaiian or Pacific Islander alone (NH)	1	0	0	0.02%	0.00%	0.00%
Other race alone (NH)	0	5	11	0.00%	0.10%	0.20%
Mixed race or Multiracial (NH)	19	4	28	0.39%	0.08%	0.52%
Hispanic or Latino (any race)	4,327	4,834	5,067	89.11%	94.99%	94.13%
Total	4,856	5,089	5,383	100.00%	100.00%	100.00%

As of the 2020 United States census, there were 5,383 people, 2,010 households, and 1,037 families residing in the CDP.

=== 2010 census ===
At the 2010 census, there were 5,089 people, 4,328 households and 1,265 families residing in the CDP. The population density was 666.7 per square mile. There were 2,239 housing units at an average density of 290.4 units per square mile (112.1 units/km^{2}). The racial makeup of the CDP was 92.38% White, 0.02% African American, 0.06% Native American, 0.18% Asian, 0.00% Pacific Islander, 6.82% from other races, and 0.55% from two or more races. Hispanic or Latino of any race were 94.99% of the population.

At the 2000 census, there were 1,574 households, of which 41.7% had children under the age of 18 living with them, 61.7% were married couples living together, 15.0% had a female householder with no husband present, and 19.6% were non-families. 18.2% of all households were made up of individuals, and 11.4% had someone living alone who was 65 years of age or older. The average household size was 3.07 and the average family size was 3.50.

31% of the population were under the age of 18, 7.4% from 20 to 24, 30.1% from 25 to 49, 15.2% from 50 to 64, and 12.9% who were 65 years of age or older. The median age was 32 years. For every 100 females, there were 92.2 males. For every 100 females age 18 and over, there were 89.8 males.

The median household income was $24,136 and the median family income was $27,708. Males had a median income of $30,833 compared with $12,604 for females. The per capita income was $11,863. About 29.1% of families and 33.5% of the population were below the poverty line, including 45.1% of those under the age of 18 and 27.0% of those ages 65 and older.

== Economy ==
Leading employers in Zapata County are the educational, health and social services, natural gas and oil, and retail trade industries.

The county’s present economy is mainly centered on oil and gas production, ranching, trading and services, and tourism. Its primary employers are in the mining/energy, construction, retail trade, health care, social welfare, and the services sector. Government is also a major employer in the county.

== Arts and culture ==
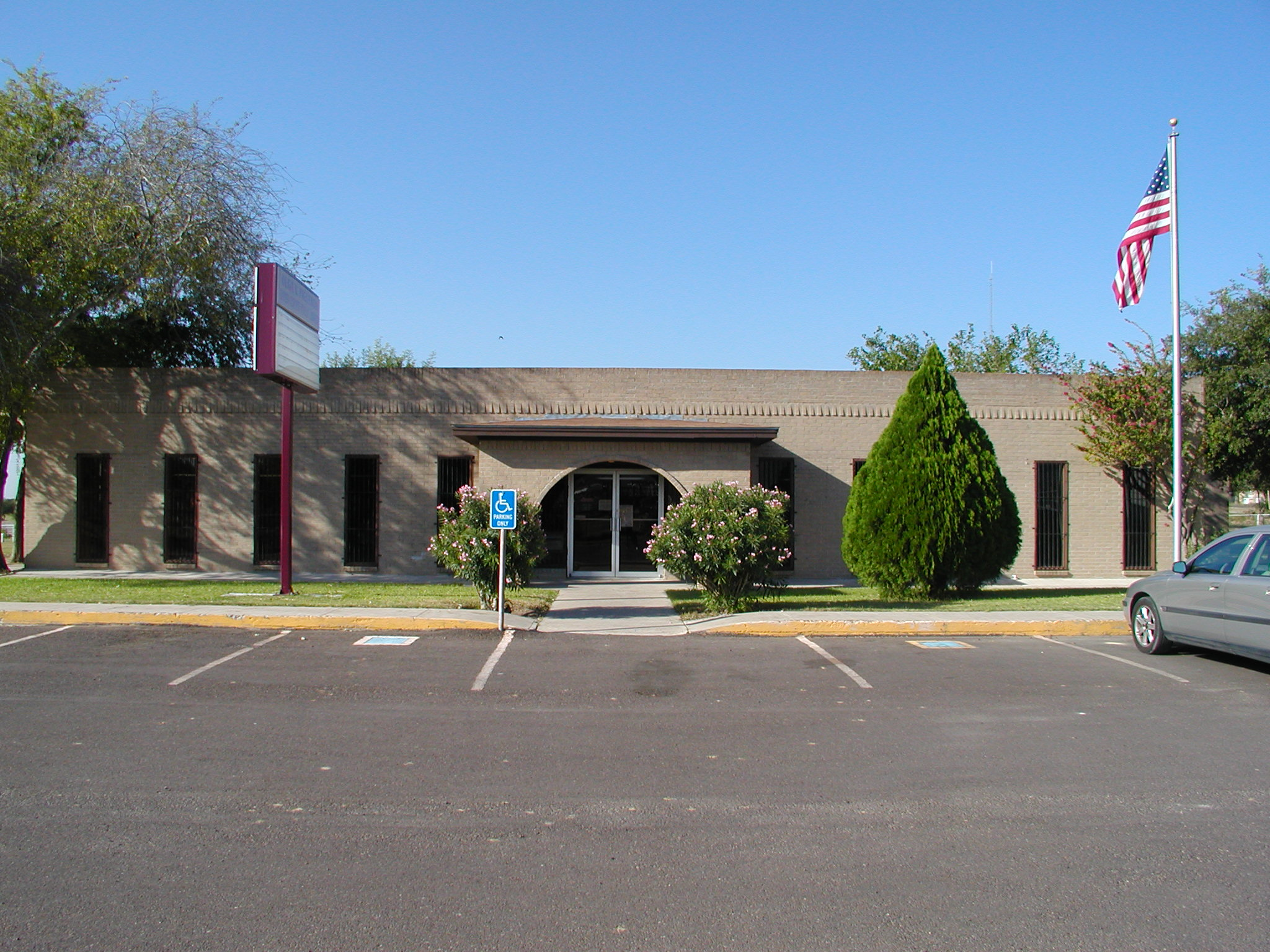
The Olga V. Figueroa Zapata County Public Library

The county operates the main branch of the Olga V. Figueroa Zapata County Public Library.

== Parks and recreation ==
The city is located on Falcon International Reservoir which is at the center of multiple fishing events throughout the year.

The city also served by a number of parks, most notably, Romeo Flores Park.

Falcon International Reservoir located in Zapata is becoming well known for its bass fishing. The community hosts numerous "Winter Texans" between November and April, most residing in travel camper trailers. The lake has been decreasing in recent years.

More world records in hang gliding have been set from Zapata than any other location in the world. The World Record Encampment has been taking place at the Zapata County Airport since 2000, and the first hang glider flights to break the 308-mile barrier took place there the first year. A distance record of 438 miles was set by Mike Barber in 2002. Three new world records were set in 2005, with the current world record, 472 miles, set by Dustin Martin in July, 2012.

== Government ==
=== State representation ===
Zapata is represented in the Texas Senate by Democrat Judith Zaffirini, District 28, and in the Texas House of Representatives by former Democrat, now Republican Ryan Guillen, District 31.

At the Federal level, the two U.S. Senators from Texas are Republicans John Cornyn and Ted Cruz; Zapata is part of Texas' US Congressional 28th District, which is currently represented by Democrat Henry Cuellar.

== Education ==
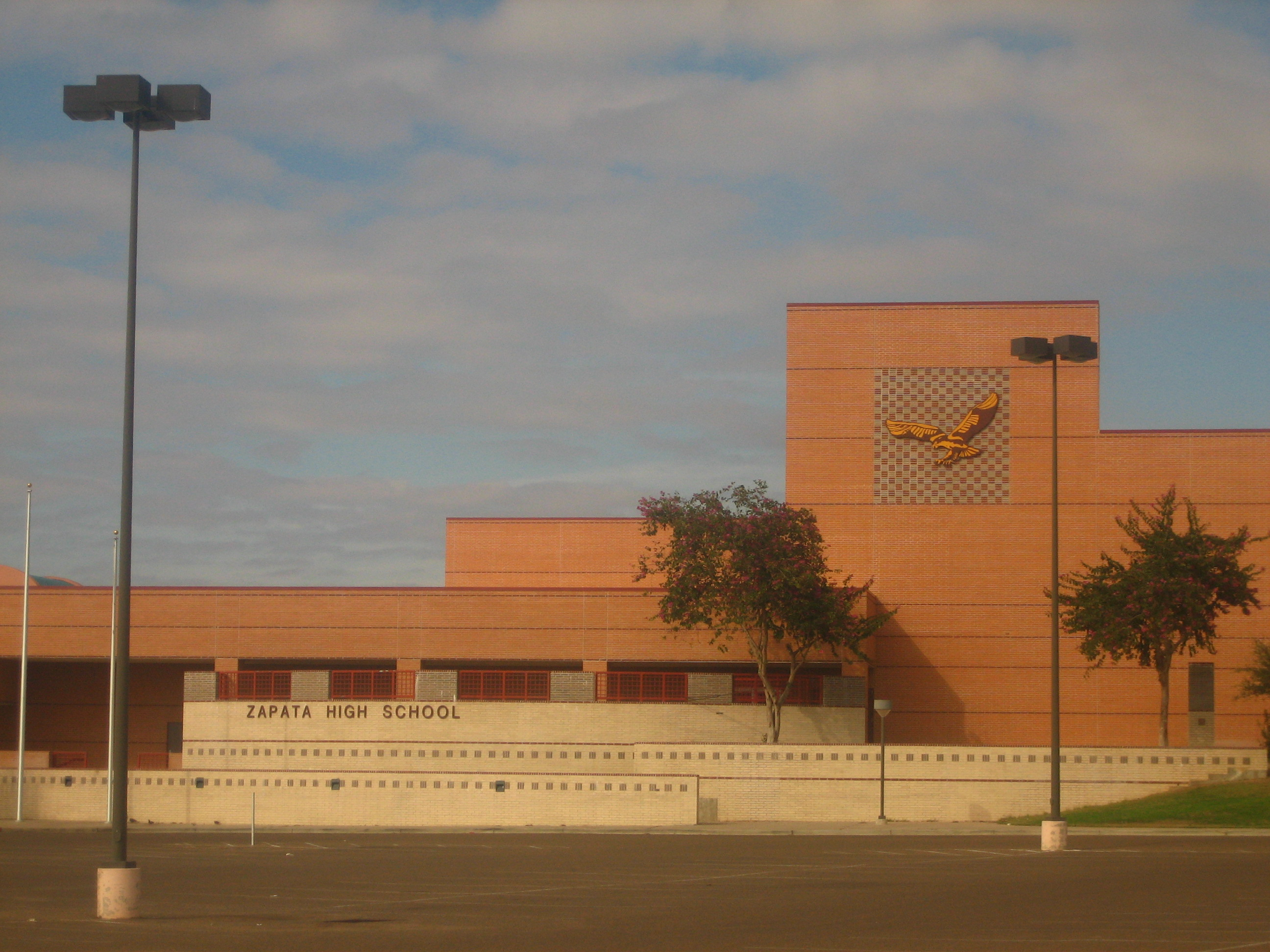
Zapata High School

All of Zapata County is within the Zapata County Independent School District. Schools located in Zapata include:

- Zapata High School
- Zapata Middle School
- Arturo L. Benavides Elementary School
- Fidel and Andrea R. Villarreal Elementary School
- Zapata North Elementary School
- Zapata South Elementary School

== Infrastructure ==
=== Transportation ===
Major highways in Zapata and their starting and ending points:

- U.S. Highway 83 Brownsville-Zapata-Westhope.
- Texas State Highway 16 Zapata Wichita Falls
- Farm to Market Road 496 Zapata – Falcon Mesa
- Farm to Market Road 3074 Falcon Mesa – Falcon Mesa

Zapata County Airport provides general aviation services to Zapata.
