= Zapata County Independent School District =

School district in Texas, United States

Location
- 1302 Glenn Street, Zapata, Texas 78076 U.S.
- Coordinates: 26.910889°N 99.270008°W

District information
- Type: Independent school district
- Grades: Pre-K through 12
- President: Ricardo X. Ramirez

Students and staff
- Students: 3,606
- Teachers: 226
- Student–teacher ratio: 16:1

Other information
- TEA District Accountability Rating for 2019: B
- Website: www.zcisd.org

Zapata County Independent School District is a public school district based in Zapata, Texas, United States. The district's boundaries parallel that of Zapata County.

In 2019, the school district received a B from the Texas Education Agency. In 2017, the Texas Education Agency gave the school district an accountability rating of "met standard."

In 2017, the Texas Education Agency gave the school district a rating of 74 in college readiness, compared to a target score of 60.

== Schools ==
=== High school ===
- Grades 9-12
  - Zapata High School

=== Middle school ===
- Grades 6-8
  - Zapata Middle School

=== Elementary schools ===
- Grades PK-5
  - Fidel and Andrea R. Villarreal Elementary School
  - Zapata South Elementary School
  - Zapata North Elementary School
  - Arturo L. Benavides Elementary School (San Ygnacio)
