= Mesquite, Starr County, Texas =

Mesquite, Texas
- CDP
- Interactive map of Mesquite, Texas
- Coordinates: 26°24′9″N 98°58′51″W
- Country: United States
- State: Texas
- County: Starr

Area
  - Total: 0.1 sq mi (0.26 km^{2})
  - Land: 0.1 sq mi (0.26 km^{2})
  - Water: 0.0 sq mi (0 km^{2})

Population (2020)
  - Total: 479
  - Density: 4,800/sq mi (1,800/km^{2})
- Time zone: UTC-6 (Central (CST))
  - Summer (DST): UTC-5 (CDT)
- Zip Code: 78584

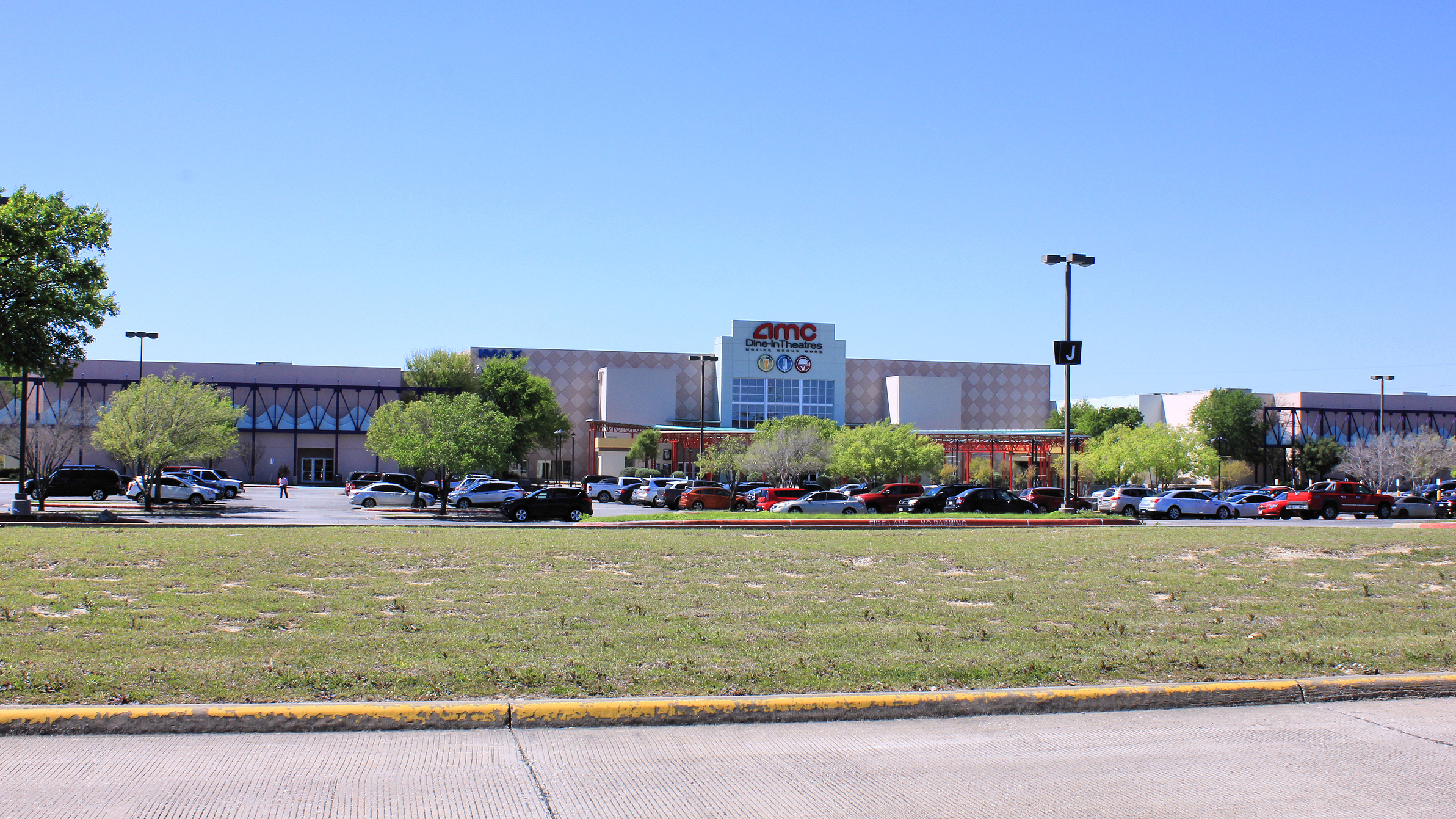
The exterior of the AMC DINE-IN Mesquite 30 in Mesquite, Texas, USA.

Mesquite is a census-designated place (CDP) in Starr County, Texas, United States. It is a new CDP, formed from part of the former Escobares CDP prior to the 2010 census, with a population of 505.

== Geography ==
Mesquite is located at 26°24′9″N 98°58′51″W (26.402434, −98.980938).

== Demographics ==
Historical population
Census	Pop.	Note	%±
2010	505		—
2020	479		−5.1%
U.S. Decennial Census; 1850–1900 1910; 1920 1930 1940; 1950 1960 1970; 1980 1990 2000; 2010 2020

Mesquite was formed prior to the 2010 U.S. census along with Old Escobares CDP from the part of the Escobares CDP that was not incorporated into the city of Escobares.

=== 2020 census ===
Mesquite CDP, Texas – Racial and ethnic composition Note: the US Census treats Hispanic/Latino as an ethnic category. This table excludes Latinos from the racial categories and assigns them to a separate category. Hispanics/Latinos may be of any race.
Race / Ethnicity (NH = Non-Hispanic)	Pop 2010	Pop 2020	% 2010	% 2020
White alone (NH)	22	10	4.36%	2.09%
Black or African American alone (NH)	0	0	0.00%	0.00%
Native American or Alaska Native alone (NH)	0	0	0.00%	0.00%
Asian alone (NH)	0	0	0.00%	0.00%
Pacific Islander alone (NH)	0	0	0.00%	0.00%
Some Other Race alone (NH)	0	1	0.00%	0.21%
Mixed Race or Multi-Racial (NH)	0	0	0.00%	0.00%
Hispanic or Latino (any race)	483	468	95.64%	97.70%
Total	505	479	100.00%	100.00%

== Education ==
The CDP is within the Roma Independent School District. The zoned elementary school for the 2010 Census community is R. T. Barrera Elementary School. Roma High School is the district's sole comprehensive high school.
