= Old Escobares, Texas =

- Unincorporated community Former Census designated place
- Interactive map of Old Escobares, Texas
- Country: United States
- State: Texas
- County: Starr

Population (2010)
  - Total: 97
- Time zone: UTC-6 (Central (CST))
  - Summer (DST): UTC-5 (CDT)

Old Escobares is an unincorporated community and former census-designated place (CDP) in Starr County, Texas, United States.

Old Escobares was formed along with Mesquite CDP from the part of the Escobares CDP that was not incorporated into the city of Escobares. The CDP was first listed in the 2010 census with a population of 97.

Old Escobares was absorbed by the city of Escobares prior to the 2020 U.S. census and delisted as a CDP.

== Demographics ==
Historical population
Census	Pop.	Note	%±
2010	97		—
U.S. Decennial Census; 1850–1900 1910; 1920 1930 1940; 1950 1960 1970; 1980 1990 2000; 2010

Old Escobares CDP, Texas – Racial and ethnic composition Note: the US Census treats Hispanic/Latino as an ethnic category. This table excludes Latinos from the racial categories and assigns them to a separate category. Hispanics/Latinos may be of any race.
Race / Ethnicity (NH = Non-Hispanic)	Pop 2010	% 2010
White alone (NH)	0	0.00%
Black or African American alone (NH)	0	0.00%
Native American or Alaska Native alone (NH)	0	0.00%
Asian alone (NH)	0	0.00%
Pacific Islander alone (NH)	0	0.00%
Other race alone (NH)	0	0.00%
Mixed race or Multiracial (NH)	0	0.00%
Hispanic or Latino (any race)	97	100.00%
Total	97	100.00%
