= Birdie Robertson Johnson =

American suffragist and clubwoman

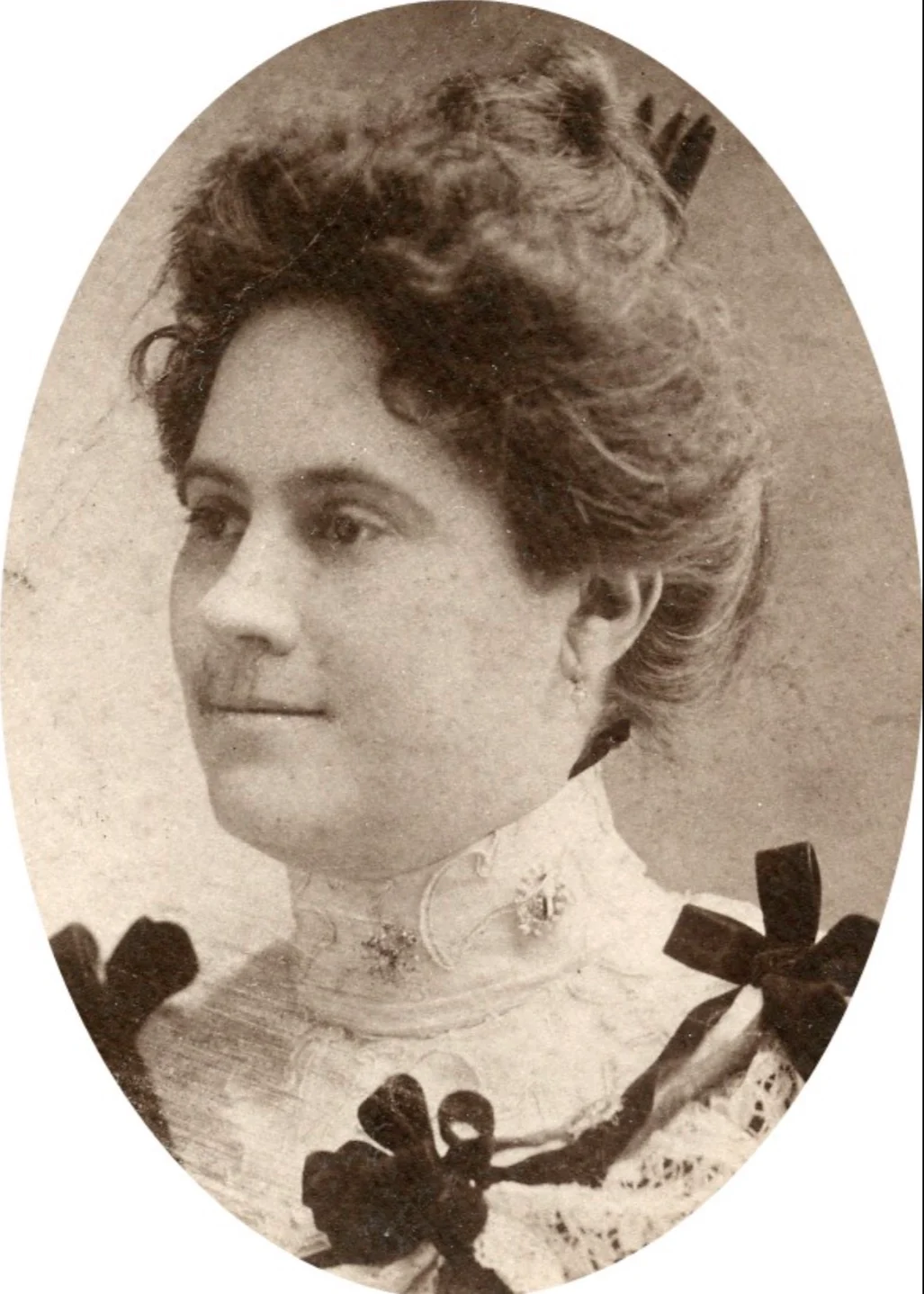

President of the Texas Federation of Women's Clubs
- In office 1905–1907

Texas Division President, United Daughters of the Confederacy
- In office 1901–1902
- Preceded by: Benedette Moore Tobin

Personal details
- Born: Eliza Sophia Robertson; November 15, 1868 Salado, Texas, U.S.
- Died: November 15, 1926 (aged 58) Fort Worth, Texas, U.S.
- Party: Democratic
- Spouse: Cone Johnson
- Parents: Elijah Sterling Clack Robertson (father); Mary Elizabeth Dickey (mother)
- Relatives: Sterling C. Robertson (grandfather); James Robertson (great-grand uncle)
- Education: Salado College; Wesleyan Female College
- Occupation: suffragist, clubwoman

Eliza Sophia Robertson Johnson (November 15, 1868 – November 15, 1926), known as Birdie Robertson Johnson, was an American suffragist and clubwoman. She was the first Democratic national committeewoman from Texas and served as president of the Texas Federation of Women's Clubs. Johnson also served as President of the Texas Division of the United Daughters of the Confederacy.

== Early life and family ==
Johnson was born Eliza Sophia Robertson on November 15, 1868 in Salado, Texas. She was the ninth of twelve children of Elijah Sterling Clack Robertson and Mary Elizabeth Dickey Robertson. Her grandfather, Sterling C. Robertson, was the founder of Robertson's Colony. Her great-granduncle, James Robertson, was one of the founders of Nashville, Tennessee.

She grew up on her family's plantation. She graduated from Salado College in 1886 before studying music at Wesleyan Female College, where she graduated summa cum laude in 1888.

== Activism, politics, and civic work ==
As the wife of a prominent Texas politician, Johnson leveraged her position to become involved in Democratic politics on the national level. She was active in her husband's campaigns and in local, state, and national organizations that supported women's suffrage, social services, education, and genealogy.

Johnson served as president of the Woman's Home Missionary Society at Marvin Methodist Episcopal Church and was a member of the International Order of the King's Daughters and Sons. She was also a member of the Quid Nunc literary club, the Daughters of the American Revolution, the United States Daughters of 1812, the Daughters of the Republic of Texas, and the United Daughters of the Confederacy. She served as Texas Division President of the United Daughters of the Confederacy and, in 1901, led a lobbying campaign to persuade the Texas Legislature to fund a memorial to General Albert Sidney Johnston. She was successful in her campaign, receiving a $10,000 grant for the memorial.

Johnson served on the board of regents of the Girl's Industrial College from 1902 to 1913 and was on the executive board of the Conference for Education in Texas.

She served as the president of the Texas Federation of Women's Clubs from 1905 to 1907.

Johnson worked on Woodrow Wilson's campaign during the 1912 United States presidential election. She was vice president of the Woman's National Wilson and Marshall Organization and served as president of the organization's Texas chapter. She was an active member of the League of Women Voters and served as the co-director of the League's State Women for Neff organization, which supported Pat Morris Neff's gubernatorial campaign. She headed the women's division of the Texas Democratic Party in 1920. Johnson and her husband both served a delegates to the 1920 Democratic National Convention in San Francisco. She was unanimously chosen by the Texas delegation as their first Democratic national committeewoman from Texas, serving in the role until 1923, when she withdrew from politics.

Johnson also served on the executive board of the Tyler chapter of the American Red Cross, directed the Woman's War Saving Committee, and campaigned for the Liberty Loan Committee. Following World War I, she was instrumental in establishing a YWCA in Tyler.

== Personal life ==
She married Cone Johnson, a state senator and solicitor of the United States Department of State, on May 8, 1889. They moved to Tyler, Texas that same year. In 1914, they moved to Washington, D.C. for her husband's appointment to the state department. They returned to Tyler in 1917.

Johnson died on November 15, 1926 in Fort Worth, Texas, following a long illness.
