= 1906 Texas gubernatorial election =

- November 8, 1906
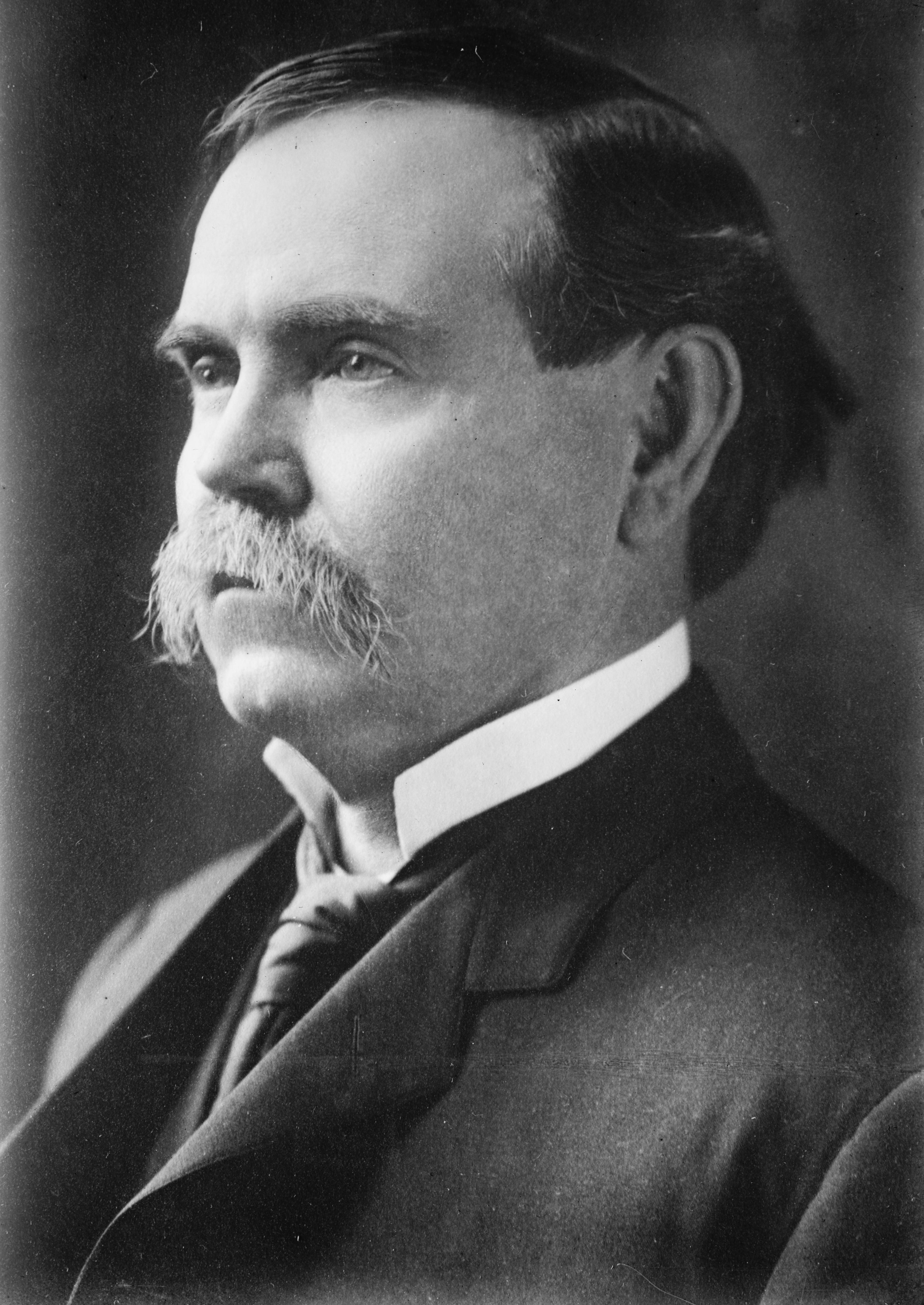

Candidate	Thomas Mitchell Campbell	C. A. Gray
Party	Democratic	Republican
Popular vote	149,105	23,771
Percentage	77.59%	12.37%
- County results Campbell: 50–60% 60–70% 70–80% 80–90% 90–100% Gray: 50–60% 60–70% 70–80% 90–100% No Data/Vote
Governor before election
S. W. T. Lanham
Democratic
Governor-elect
Thomas Mitchell Campbell
Democratic

The 1906 Texas gubernatorial election was held to elect the Governor of Texas. Thomas Mitchell Campbell was elected to a two-year term in office.

This was the first election in which a party held a primary to determine its nominee. Thomas Mitchell Campbell won the Democratic nomination over a four-man field including M. M. Brooks, Oscar Branch Colquitt and Charles K. Bell; his victory was tantamount to election with the Republican Party already weak in Texas and deeply divided at the time.

== Democratic primary ==
This marked the first time the Texas Democratic party held a statewide primary election under the "Terrell election law." It was not a primary in the sense that the popular vote directly determined the nominee, instead the vote was used to allocate pledged delegates from each county at the state convention.

=== Candidates ===
- Charles K. Bell, Attorney General of Texas and former U.S. Representative from Hamilton
- Micajah Madison Brooks, associate justice of the Court of Criminal Appeals
- Thomas Mitchell Campbell, attorney and general manager of the International–Great Northern Railroad
- Oscar Branch Colquitt, member of the Texas Railroad Commission

=== Results ===
1906 Democratic gubernatorial primary
Party	Candidate	Votes	%
Democratic	Thomas Mitchell Campbell	90,345	30.72%
Democratic	M. M. Brooks	70,064	23.82%
Democratic	Oscar Branch Colquitt	68,529	23.30%
Democratic	Charles K. Bell	65,168	22.16%
Total votes		294,106	100.00%

== General election ==
=== Candidates ===
- Alexander W. Acheson, physician and former mayor of Denison (Reorganized Republican)
- Thomas Mitchell Campbell, attorney and general manager of the International–Great Northern Railroad (Democratic)
- C. A. Gray (Republican)
- George Clifton Edwards, editor and publisher of the Laborer (Socialist)
- J. W. Pearson (Prohibition)
- Arthur S. Dowler, postmaster of Finlay (Socialist Labor)

Acheson was the candidate of the "black and tan" faction of the Republicans, while Gray was nominated by the "lily-white movement" which sought to exclude non-white men from the party.

=== Results ===
1906 Texas gubernatorial election
Party	Candidate	Votes	%	±%
Democratic	Thomas Mitchell Campbell	149,105	77.59%	▲4.02
Republican	C. A. Gray	23,771	12.37%	▼7.92
Independent Republican	Alex W. Atcheson	5,395	2.81%	N/A
Socialist	George Clifton Edwards	2,958	1.54%	▲0.52
Prohibition	J. W. Pearson	2,215	1.15%	▼0.46
Socialist Labor	Arthur S. Dowler	260	0.14%	▼0.06
Total votes		183,704	100.00%	
