= Governor Colquitt =

Governor Colquitt may refer to:

- Alfred H. Colquitt (1824–1894), 49th Governor of Georgia
- Oscar Branch Colquitt (1861–1940), 25th Governor of Texas
