= Liz Carpenter =

American writer (1920–2010)

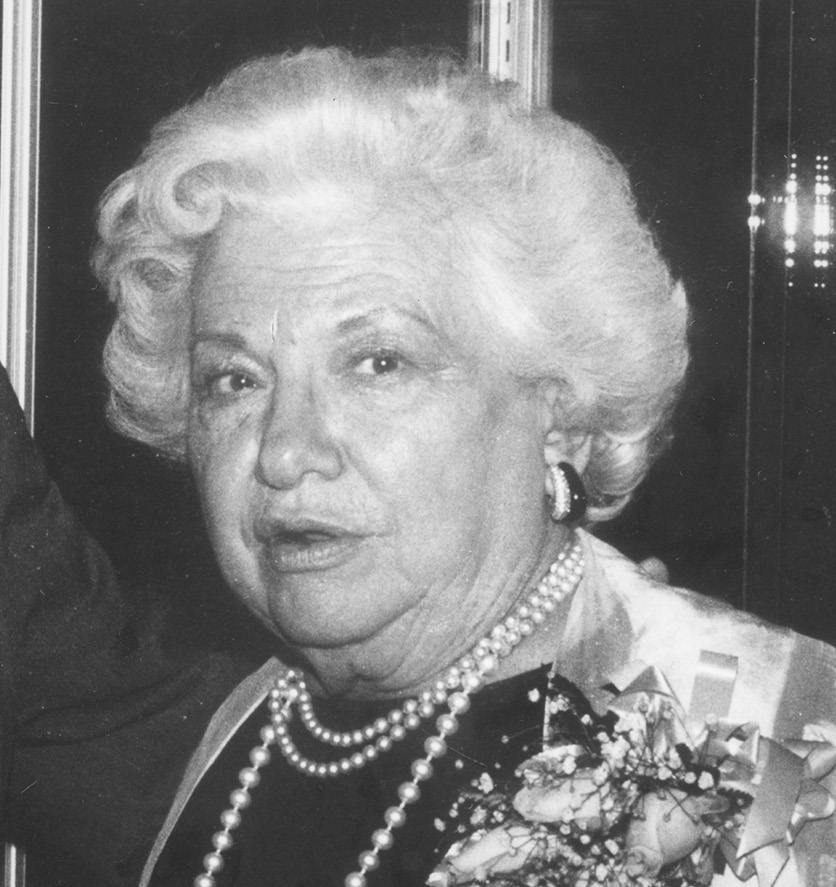
- Liz Carpenter in 1987
- Born: Mary Elizabeth Sutherland; September 1, 1920; Salado, Texas, U.S.
- Died: March 20, 2010 (aged 89); Austin, Texas, U.S.
- Education: University of Texas
- Occupations: Author, presidential advisor
- Spouse: Les Carpenter (m. 1944)
- Children: 2

Mary Elizabeth Sutherland Carpenter (September 1, 1920 – March 20, 2010) was a writer, feminist, reporter, media advisor, speechwriter, political humorist, and public relations expert. As the first woman executive assistant to Vice President Lyndon Baines Johnson from 1961 to 1963, and then as press secretary for First Lady Lady Bird Johnson from 1963 to 1969, Carpenter was a prominent member of the Johnson White House and also a close personal friend of the Johnsons.

Carpenter was an ardent supporter of the Women's Movement when it began and never wavered from her convictions. Her projects and causes ranged from supporting the Equal Rights Amendment to fighting cancer. Her lighthearted memoir of her time in the White House, Ruffles and Flourishes, published in 1969, was a national best-seller. Often called the "funniest woman in politics", she was in demand as a public speaker until her death.

== Early life ==
Carpenter was born in her great-grandparents' antebellum home, the Robertson Plantation, in Salado in southern Bell County, Texas. In 1936, the 24-room Robertson House was declared a state historic monument. In 1967, a plaque was unveiled to indicate that Carpenter had once lived there. Another memorial to Carpenter is on the campus of Salado College, founded by her great-grandfather, Elijah Robertson. At the age of seven, she moved with her family to Austin.

== Media and political career ==
In 1942, Carpenter began covering the White House and Congress for the Austin American-Statesman. For the next eighteen years, she reported on presidents from Franklin D. Roosevelt to John F. Kennedy as a Washington reporter.

She was still a working reporter at the time of the 1960 Democratic National Convention in Los Angeles, California. She soon joined the staff of Lyndon B. Johnson in his campaign for Vice President in 1960 and traveled on his foreign missions as a press spokeswoman. After Kennedy's election, she became the first woman executive assistant to the vice-president.

Carpenter was in Dallas on November 22, 1963, at the time of the assassination of John F. Kennedy. She drafted the fifty-eight words that Johnson used on his return to Washington:

This is a sad time for all people. We have suffered a loss that cannot be weighed. For me, it is a deep personal tragedy. I know that the world shares the sorrow that Mrs. Kennedy and her family bear. I will do my best. That is all I can do. I ask for your help and God's.

Following Johnson's succession to the presidency, Carpenter became the first professional newswoman to be press secretary to a first lady for Lady Bird Johnson (1963–1969), for whom she also served as staff director. Carpenter also assembled several other staffers as an informal "White House Humor Group" to add humorous remarks to the President's speeches, at Johnson's request.

After the Johnson Administration ended in 1969, she published Ruffles and Flourishes, her account of her White House experiences.

She was a vice president of Hill and Knowlton in Washington after leaving the White House. In 1971, she was one of the founders of the National Women's Political Caucus and co-chair of ERAmerica, traveling the country to push for passage of the Equal Rights Amendment.

She was appointed by President Gerald Ford to the International Women's Year Commission, by President Jimmy Carter to serve as Assistant Secretary of Education for Public Affairs, and by President Bill Clinton to serve on the White House Conference on Aging.

Carpenter was a member of the Peabody Awards Board of Jurors from 1977 to 1983.

== Literary career ==
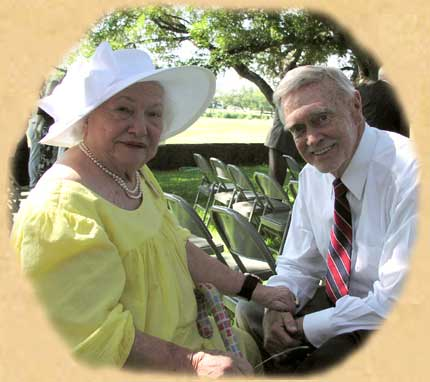
Liz Carpenter (left) with Cactus Pryor (right) in 2003

External videos
- Booknotes interview with Carpenter on Unplanned Parenthood, October 23, 1994, C-SPAN

Her books include: Unplanned Parenthood, Random House 1994; Getting Better All the Time, Simon and Schuster 1986, as well as countless articles and forays on the lecture circuit. Start With a Laugh, gives humorous advice on speech writing, was published by Eakin Press and launched at the opening of the National Women's Museum: An Institute for the Future in Dallas. Her most recent book, Presidential Humor, Bright Sky Press 2006, was a compilation of quips and quotes from "George the First to George the Worst."

Carpenter wrote an article for the Reader's Digest in the early 1980s, about enjoying life having recovered from an illness, closing the article with the poem "Warning" by British poet Jenny Joseph, which had the opening lines "When I am an old woman I shall wear purple, With a red hat which doesn't go, and doesn't suit me". This led to the poem's fame spreading across the US through adoption by the greetings card industry and eventually the development of the Red Hat Society.

== Awards and recognition ==
Carpenter was named a Distinguished Alumna of the University of Texas in 1975, and in 1990 was named distinguished alumnae of the Department of Communications. She was named by Governor Mark White to the Texas Women's Hall of Fame. She was given the ProBene Award of the College of Liberal Arts.

The Liz Carpenter Lectureship was established in 1984 by a group of her friends, including Erma Bombeck and Mark Russell, who gave a performance at the Paramount Theater to raise funds for it. In the last several years, Mrs. Carpenter's lectureship in the College of Liberal Arts has brought President Bill Clinton, President Gerald Ford, Hillary Clinton, Jehan Sadat, Maya Angelou, Bill Moyers, Jane Goodall, and writers such as Betty Friedan, Nora Ephron, Shana Alexander, and Jean Auel and nationally known humorists such as Fannie Flagg and Carol Channing.

The Liz Carpenter Award is given annually for the best scholarly book on the history of women and Texas published during the calendar year. The Award was established in 1992 by an anonymous donor who is committed to the publication of scholarly research on the history of women and Texas. The award honors Liz Carpenter, a sixth-generation Texan, for her commitment to the pursuit of the history of women in Texas and for a lifetime of achievements that qualify her as a maker of that history.

She was the recipient of Alpha Phi's Frances E. Willard Award in 1980. She died in Austin, Texas in March 2010.
