= Elijah Sterling Clack Robertson =

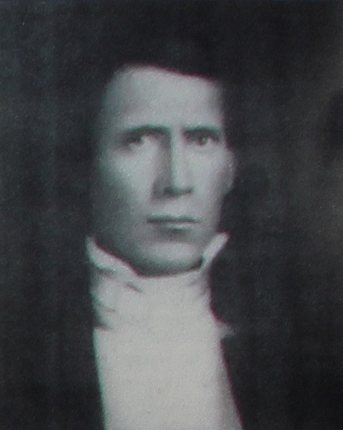
- Born: August 23, 1820; Giles County, Tennessee, US
- Died: October 8, 1879 (aged 59); Salado, Texas, US
- Spouse(s): Eliza Hamer Robertson (1846–1852) her death Mary Elizabeth Dickey (1852)
- Children: 12 (including Birdie Robertson Johnson)
- Parent(s): Sterling C. Robertson; Frances King

Elijah Sterling Clack Robertson (1820–1879) was an early Euro-American settler in Robertson's Colony in Texas. His father was the colony's founder Sterling C. Robertson. Brought to Texas to learn Spanish, he translated for both Robertson's Colony and later the Texas General Land Office. He practiced law in Milam County. Robertson was a postmaster for the Republic of Texas and the leader of a volunteer group who aided Alexander Somervell in border disputes. By 1844, he had been promoted to colonel in the Republic of Texas militia. Robertson was one of the delegates who signed the Texas Order of Secession in 1861 and served as aide-de-camp to General Henry McCulloch. The Col. Elijah Sterling Clack Robertson Plantation in Salado is listed on the National Register of Historic Places listings in Bell County, Texas.

== Early life and family background ==
Elijah Sterling Clack Robertson was born in Giles County, Tennessee, on August 23, 1820. Robertson was from a family of accomplished individuals. He was the son of Frances King and empresario Sterling Clack Robertson, the founder of Robertson's Colony in Texas. Empresario Robertson never married, but he acknowledged his son with King. Young Elijah's grandfather was Captain Elijah Robertson, who left Brunswick County, Virginia, in the 18th century to join family members and other early Euro-American settlers in Tennessee. His great-uncle, Captain Elijah's brother James Robertson, was known as the Father of Tennessee. Robertson's great-granddaughter was author Liz Carpenter, who was a press spokesperson for both President Lyndon B. Johnson and later for Ladybird Johnson.

== Texas ==
In 1832, his father brought Robertson from Tennessee and placed him in the Mission School of St. Mary to study the Spanish language. Robertson boarded in San Antonio with John William Smith, who would later become the final messenger sent out by William Barrett Travis at the Battle of the Alamo. Robertson was born as Sterling Clack Robertson, the same name as his father. The priests at the Mission School added "Elijah". In 1833, Smith alerted Robertson's father that Robertson had quit attending school; Robertson's father subsequently put him to work translating Robertson's Colony deeds into Spanish. In return for his services, Robertson received 1,107 acres (4.48 km^{2}; 1.730 sq mi) in Milam County. In 1835, Robertson formed his own rangers company to deal with Indian depredations. Young Robertson joined the ranger company. (They did not become known as the "Texas Rangers" until future years, but this group was one of the forerunners.

== College in Tennessee ==
In April 1837, Robertson sent young Robertson to school at Jackson College in Maury County, Tennessee. He remained enrolled there until May 1839.

== Return to Texas ==
When Robertson returned to Texas, he served as chief clerk, later acting postmaster, in the Republic of Texas postal service. Robertson was a member of the Democratic Party. In 1840, he lost an election against Joseph P. Lynch for sheriff of Washington County. In 1841, he had a brief stint as assistant secretary of the Senate.

In 1842, Robertson organized a company of volunteers from Gonzales County, joining Edward Burleson at Mission Concepcion in San Antonio to oust Mexican general Ráfael Vásquez from the city. While there, Robertson learned of the March 4 death of his father Sterling C. Robertson. That same year, he became a captain in the Republic of Texas militia, becoming part of the Somervell Expedition. He was promoted to the rank of colonel by 1844.

Robertson began working in a Cincinnati, Texas country store in 1845, earning $85.50 after ten months. In his spare time, he taught himself law by reading Blackstone's Commentaries. He was admitted to the Bar to practice law in Milam County. In 1848, Robertson was a translator of Spanish deeds in the Texas General Land Office. Bell County elected him Chief Justice in 1858.

== Salado ==
=== Robertson plantation ===
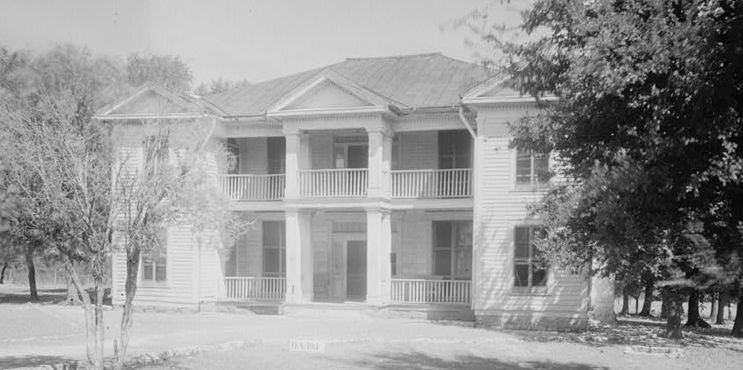
Col. Elijah Robertson's Plantation

In 1853, Robertson moved to Salado with his second wife, Mary Elizabeth Dickey. He began the construction of the family plantation in 1854. The plantation included the main house, slave quarters, and a family cemetery. Mrs. Robertson's mother Sophia Dickey Lynch moved in with the couple, to escape her abusive husband Julius C. Lynch. (This was not the Joseph Penn Lynch to whom Robertson had lost an election in 1840.) Lynch followed her to the Robertson home to demand her return. Robertson defended his mother-in-law and killed Lynch. The jury impaneled for the subsequent trial returned a verdict of justifiable homicide.

=== Salado college ===
Salado College was begun on land donated by Robertson in 1859 to establish the school.

== Secession Convention and Civil War ==
Robertson was a delegate to the Secession Convention in 1861 and signed the Texas Ordinance of Secession. In 1862, Robertson became aide-de-camp to General Henry Eustace McCulloch This was the only position he held during the Civil War, but he donated a large portion of his financial resources to the cause of the Confederacy. On November 18, 1865, Robertson received a full pardon from President Andrew Johnson.

== Constitutional convention of 1875 ==
Robertson was elected to the 1875 convention to draft the Texas Constitution

== Personal life ==
Robertson married his second cousin Eliza Hamer Robertson on July 29, 1846. She was the daughter of James Randolph Robertson, first cousin to empresario Sterling Clack Robertson. She died on March 25, 1852. On November 8, 1852, he married Mary Elizabeth Dickey. The couple had twelve children. One of their daughters was Eliza S. R. Johnson (1868–1926), known as "Birdie", wife of Texas State Senator Cone Johnson. A suffragist active in women's rights issues, she served on the first board of regents for Texas Woman's University.

Robertson died at Salado on October 8, 1879. Mary Elizabeth died on December 11, 1882. Both are buried in the family cemetery on the plantation.

Late in life, Robertson joined the Methodist Church.

== Legacy ==
- Col. Elijah Sterling Clack Robertson Plantation, listed on the National Register of Historic Places listings in Bell County, Texas
- Statue of Robertson by artist Clay H. Dahlberg, Salado College Hill
- He was the great-grandfather of White house aide and journalist Liz Carpenter.
