= Friedrich Wilderness Park =

Park in Texas, United States

- Vista Loop Trial in Friedrich Wilderness Park
- Interactive map of Friedrich Wilderness Park
- Type: Public City Park
- Location: San Antonio, TX
- Coordinates: 29.64°N 98.6254°W
- Area: 633 acres (2.56 km^{2})
- Created: August 31, 1978
- Operator: City of San Antonio Department of Parks and Recreation
- Open: Every day (except Christmas & New Year's)

Friedrich Wilderness Park lies at the southern end of the Texas Hill Country. The park is hilly due to its location on the Balcones escarpment that separates the Texas Hill Country from the flat South Texas region.

== History ==
Norma Friedrich Ward donated 180 acres (0.73 km^{2}) of land to San Antonio, Texas, for use as a public park. Additional land was donated by Wilbur Matthews and Glen Martin. The park was developed with monies from Ms Ward and a grant from the Texas Parks and Wildlife Department. The park opened in 1978.

== Notable features ==
=== Endangered bird ===
One endangered bird, the golden-cheeked warbler spends summer in the park.

=== Topography ===
Fall colors of Friedrich Wilderness Park. Black Hill (Government Canyon State Natural Area) is on the horizon.

The park is in the transition zone between the flat South Texas region and the Texas Hill Country. The parking lot is at 1,140 feet (350 m) elevation above sea level and 500 feet (150 m) above the San Antonio River in Downtown San Antonio.

The highest hill in the park is 285 feet (87 m) higher (1425 feet above sea level). The skyscrapers of Downtown San Antonio can be seen from the highest points in the park.

== See also ==
- Balcones escarpment
- Texas Hill Country
