= Salado College =

- Salado College Archeological Site
- U.S. National Register of Historic Places
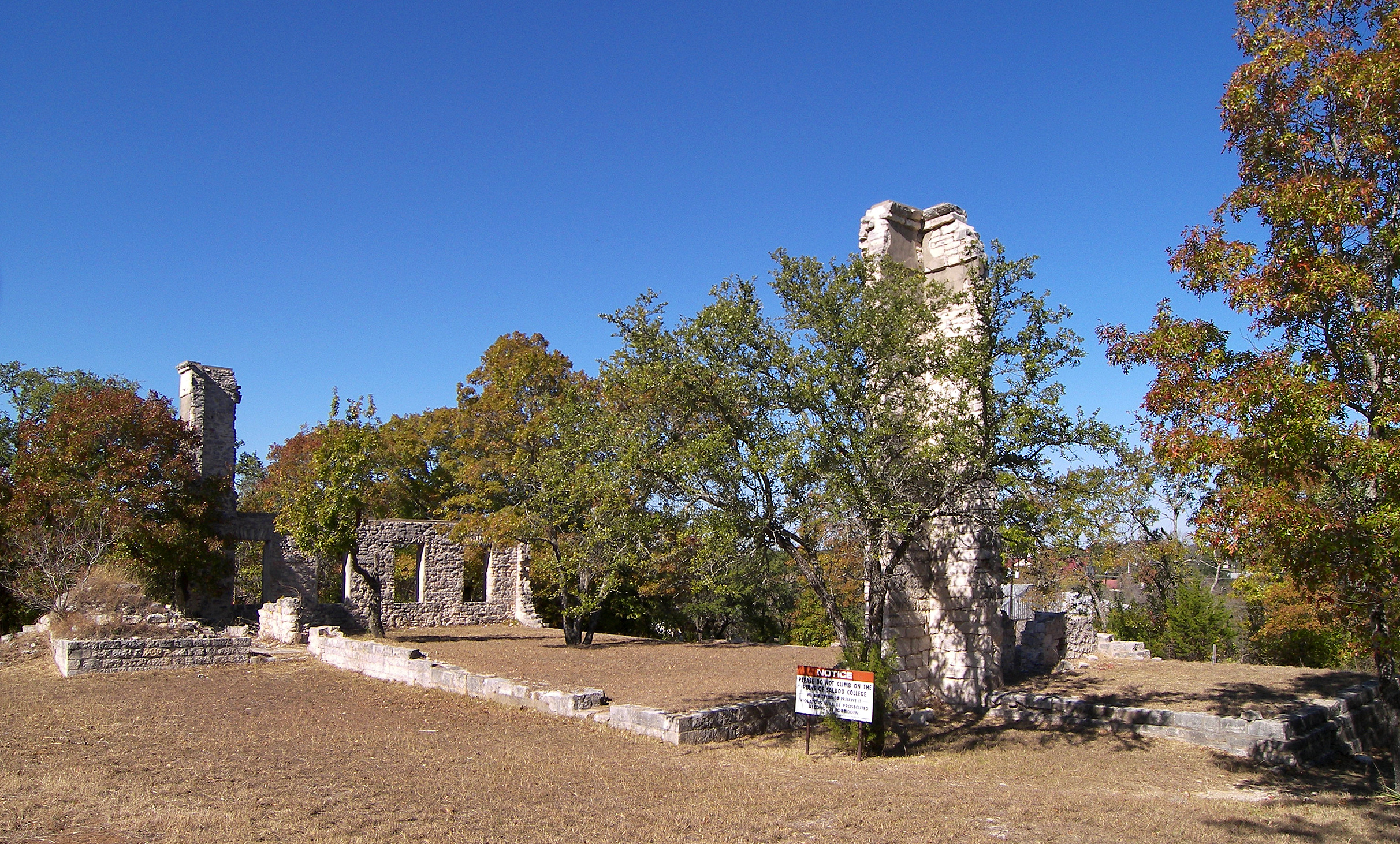
- Ruins of Salado College in 2008

- Location within Texas Location within the United States
- Location: Corner of S. Main St. and College Hill Dr. Salado, Texas
- Coordinates: 30°56′28″N 97°32′13″W
- Area: 7.5 acres (3.0 ha)
- Built: 1859
- MPS: Salado MRA
- NRHP reference No.: 85000403
- Added to NRHP: March 1, 1985

Salado College was a college in Salado, Texas, United States that operated from 1860 until 1885.

== History ==
Salado College began on October 8, 1859 at a tent meeting at Salado Springs of prominent men from throughout Bell County with a desire to create a high class school in the county. They organized the Salado College Joint Stock Company and raised $5,000 for the college through sale of stock. The board of the company had seven trustees. Colonel Elijah Sterling Clack Robertson was elected President of the board.

Robertson donated 100 acres (0.40 km^{2}) of land to the college on October 16, 1859. Ten acres of the land was for the college grounds and ninety acres was subdivided and sold to families moving to the area. The proceeds of the land sale provided money for building the school. Salado College was the first college in the state to operate without church or state funds.

On February 8, 1860, Salado College was incorporated by the Texas Legislature for twenty years to grant diplomas, confer degrees and perform other corporate functions. Unlike most colleges of the era in the United States, Salado College was to be coeducational. The college erected a temporary wooden building, and the first classes began on February 20, 1860. Seventy-five students were enrolled the first term. Students that did not live in the area boarded with local families as the college had no dormitory. Teachers temporarily lived in tents.

On July 4, 1860, area Masons laid the cornerstone for the college's permanent two-story limestone building. The ceremony attracted visitors from as far away as Austin and Waco. The college sold many more lots as families moved to Salado to get their children a good education. Attendance increased to 124 students the next year. Attendance at the school peaked at 307 students in 1865 with an average of 250 from 1866 to 1872.

In 1871, the college added a two-story annex. However, enrollment dropped sharply because of the Panic of 1873. The number of students also decreased as more state-funded colleges were established. Finally, Colonel Robertson had to step in and buy the college in 1877 to keep it from being closed due to foreclosure on the property. Colonel Robertson died in 1879.

The state charter expired on February 8, 1880. A new corporation formed in 1882 and purchased the land on which the college building stood from Robertson's heirs. The school operated as Salado College until 1885. However, the college was not rechartered with the state, so it granted no degrees between 1880 and 1884. In 1885, Salado College ceased operating as a college. The college had operated for its entire existence without endowments, sustained solely by tuition.

The Salado College Board of Trustees leased the site to Dr. S. J. Jones who established a private high school. He operated it as Thomas Arnold High School from 1890 until 1913 when he retired. The school closed in 1918 and became a free public school until 1924.

A fire destroyed the main building in 1901 and again in 1902. The building was rebuilt each time. A fire in 1924 destroyed the building again. This time the citizens could not afford to rebuild. Oral history recounts the nature of these fires as "suspicious," but the basis for the claim of arson is lost in local legend.

The site was subjected to an archaeological survey. The ruins of the building were stabilized, and the site is now open to the public.

== Notable alumni ==
- James Edward Ferguson, 26th Governor of Texas, expelled from Salado for disobedience
- Miriam Amanda Ferguson, 29th and 32nd Governor of Texas
- Birdie Robertson Johnson, suffragist

== See also ==
- National Register of Historic Places listings in Bell County, Texas
