= 1912 Texas gubernatorial election =

- November 5, 1912
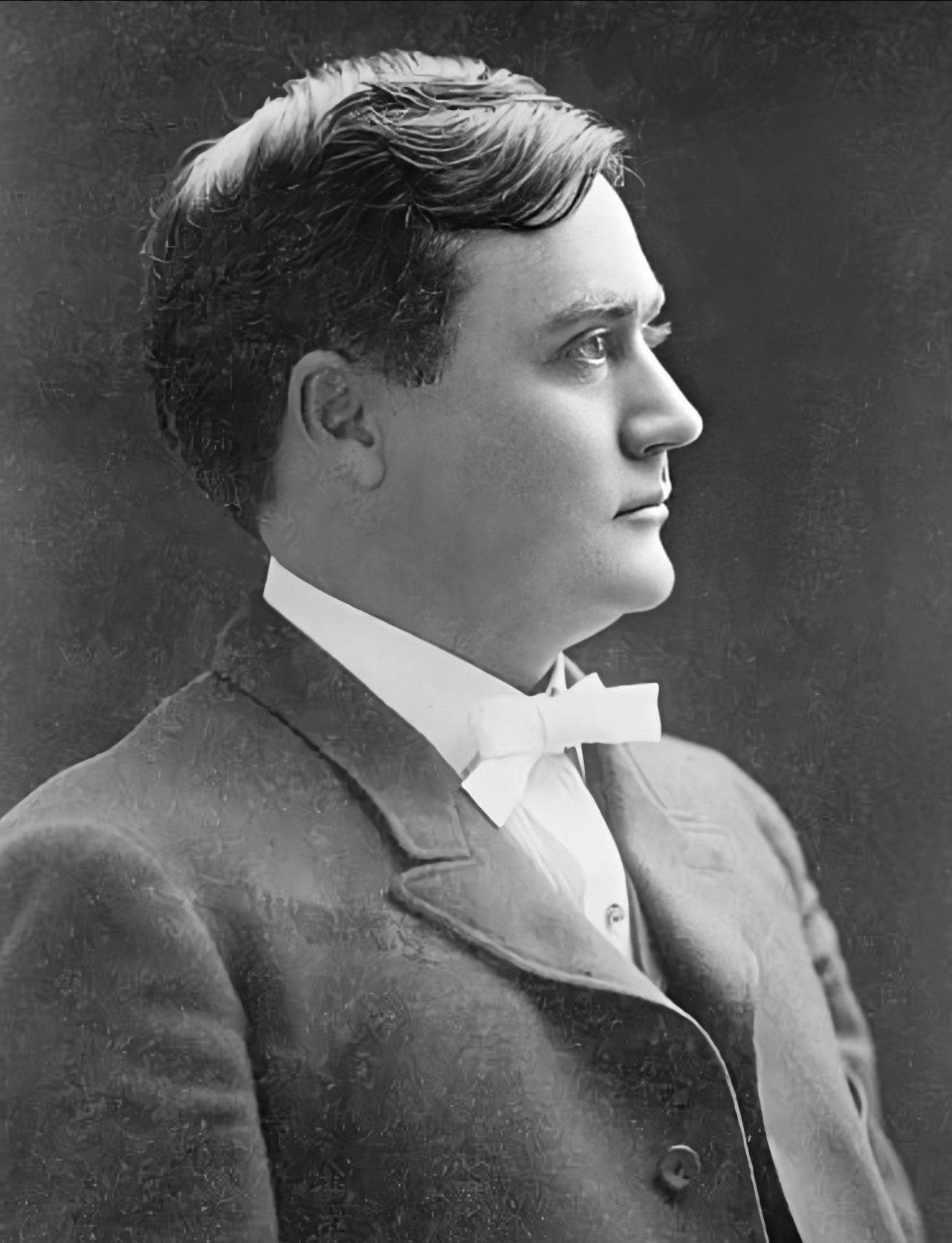

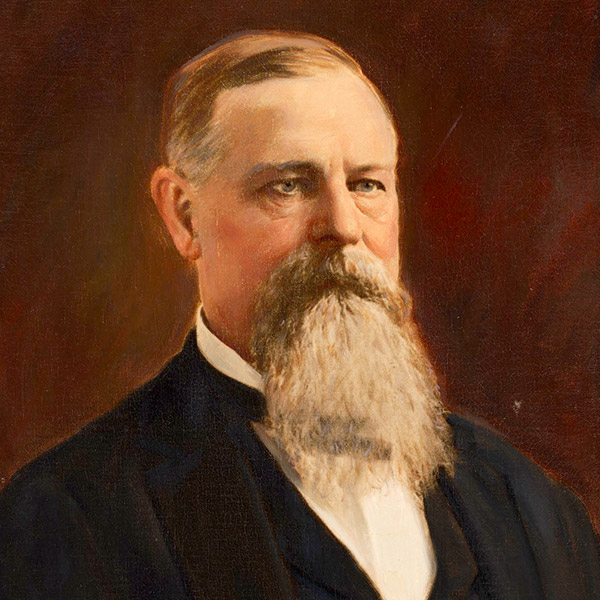
Nominee	Oscar Branch Colquitt	Reddin Andrews
Party	Democratic	Socialist
Popular vote	234,352	25,258
Percentage	77.82%	8.39%
Nominee	C. W. Johnson	Ed C. Lasater
Party	Republican	Progressive
Popular vote	23,089	15,794
Percentage	7.67%	5.24%
- County results Colquitt: 40–50% 50–60% 60–70% 70–80% 80–90% 90–100% Johnson: 30–40% 50–60% No Data/Vote
Governor before election
Oscar Branch Colquitt
Democratic
Elected Governor
Oscar Branch Colquitt
Democratic

The 1912 Texas gubernatorial election was held on November 5, 1912, in order to elect the Governor of Texas. Incumbent Democratic governor Oscar Branch Colquitt easily won re-election to a second term, defeating his token opposition from various other parties.

== Democratic primary ==
In the early 20th century, winning the Democratic primary was akin to total victory in the election, as Texas was a solidly Democratic state. Governor Colquitt was challenged by Texas Supreme Court justice William F. Ramsey, but narrowly won the primary with 55% of the vote to Ramsey's 45%, effectively securing re-election.

=== Primary results ===
Democratic primary results
Party	Candidate	Votes	%
Democratic	Oscar Branch Colquitt (incumbent)	219,808	55.00
Democratic	William F. Ramsey	179,857	45.00
Total votes		399,665	100.00

== General election ==
Governor Colquitt faced scattered opposition in the general election, and defeated his five opponents with ease, winning 77.82% of the popular vote and keeping the governor's mansion in Democratic hands.

=== Results ===
1912 Texas Gubernatorial Election
Party	Candidate	Votes	%	±%
Democratic	Oscar Branch Colquitt (incumbent)	234,352	77.82	▲1.97
Socialist	Reddin Andrews	25,258	8.39	▲3.12
Republican	C.W. Johnson	23,089	7.67	▼4.30
Progressive	Ed Lasater	15,794	5.24	N/A
Prohibition	Andrew Jackson Houston	2,355	0.78	▼1.99
Socialist Labor	K.E. Choate	308	0.10	▼0.10
Total votes		301,157	100.00	
Democratic hold				
