= Benedette Moore Tobin =

American clubwoman and socialite

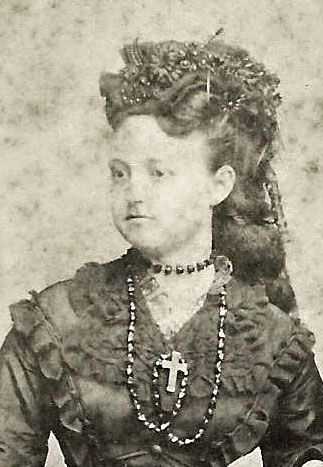

Texas Division President, United Daughters of the Confederacy
- In office November 29, 1899 – April 5, 1901
- Succeeded by: Birdie Robertson Johnson

Personal details
- Born: Benedette Brace Moore; 1849 Camden, Arkansas, U.S.
- Died: April 5, 1901 (aged 51–52) Austin, Texas, U.S.
- Resting place: Oakwood Cemetery
- Spouse: William Henry Tobin
- Children: 5

Benedette Brace Moore Tobin (1849 – 1901) was an American clubwman and socialite. She served as President of the Texas Division of the United Daughters of the Confederacy from 1899 until her death in 1901.

== Women's clubs ==
In 1890, Tobin led a group of women in Austin, Texas to form the Women's World Fair Exhibit Association of Texas to raise funds for a building to house Texas booster activities at the World's Columbian Exposition.

Tobin was a member of the United Daughters of the Confederacy. She served as Texas Division President of the United Daughters of the Confederacy from 1899 until her death on April 5, 1901. She worked with the Albert Sidney Johnson Chapter of the United Daughters of the Confederacy in Austin to raise funds for a Confederate monument honoring Albert Sidney Johnston. Tobin organized a monument committee, made up of thirty-four women, that presented the petition for a monument to the Texas State Legislature in 1898. After the legislature denied the petition, Tobin increased the size of the committee to fifty women and sought advice from Senator R. N Stafford.

== Personal life ==
Tobin was married to the physician William Henry Tobin, with whom she had five children.

She died on April 5, 1901 in Austin, while in office as Texas Division President of the United Daughters of the Confederacy.
