= Cone Johnson =

American politician

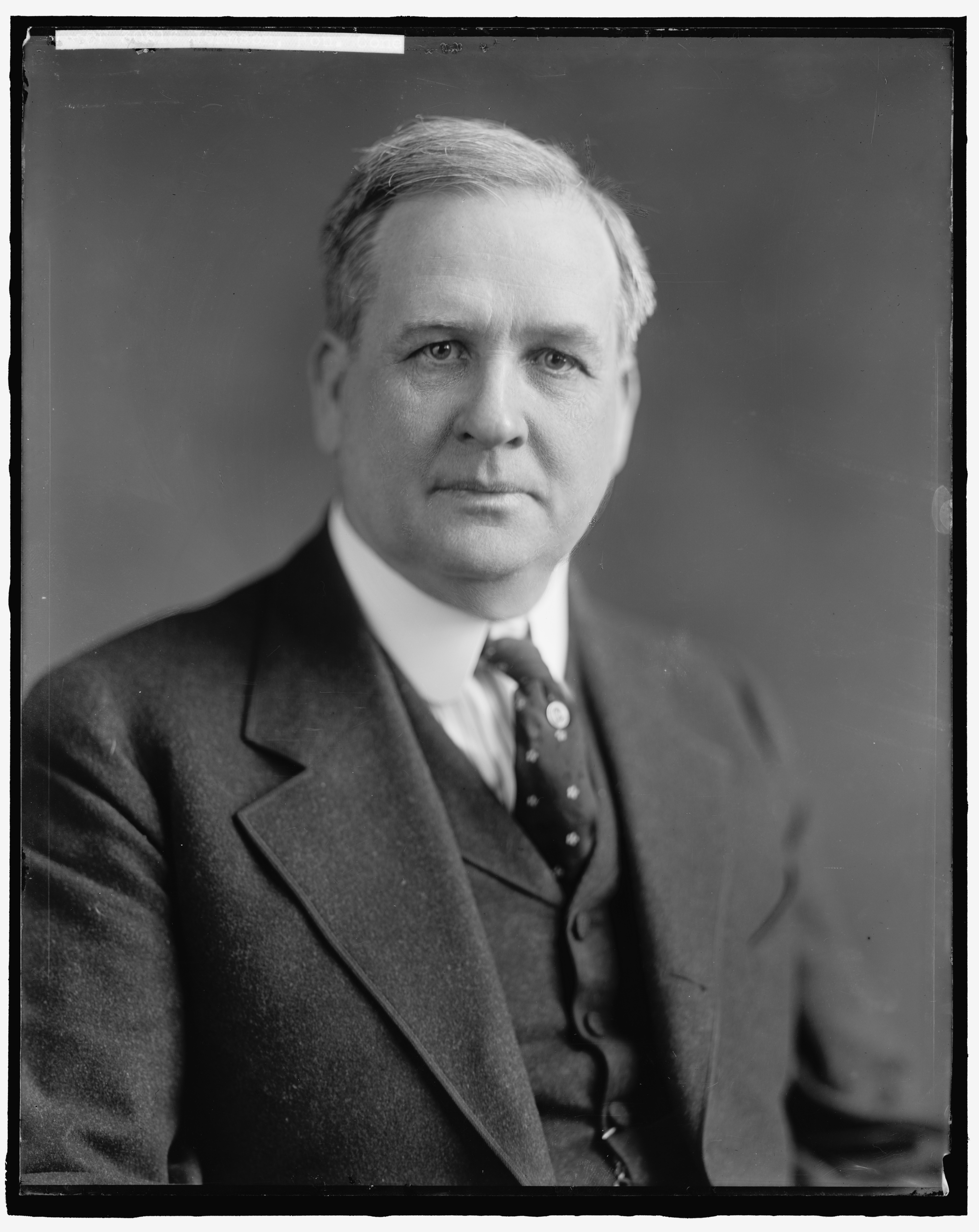

State Senator for 6th District of Texas
- In office 1888–1892

Member of the Texas House of Representatives
- In office 1886–1887

Personal details
- Born: William Cone Johnson; June 11, 1860 Dawsonville, Georgia, U.S.
- Died: March 17, 1933 (aged 72) Tyler, Texas, U.S.
- Party: Democratic
- Spouse(s): Eliza Sophia Robertson; Ethel Frances Hilton
- Education: Peabody Normal College; Emory College
- Occupation: lawyer

William Cone Johnson (June 11, 1860 – March 17, 1933) was an American lawyer and politician. He sat in the Texas House of Representatives and the Texas State Senate.

== Early life and education ==
Johnson was born on June 11, 1860 in Dawsonville, Georgia, to Samuel Caraway Johnson and Emily Swilling. He attended Emery College in Oxford, Georgia and graduated with a bachelor of arts degree in 1880 from Peabody Normal College in Nashville, Tennessee.

== Career ==
=== Law ===
Johnson settled in Tyler, Texas, after completing school, and taught there for two years at Texas Eastern University while studying law with William S. Herndon. He was admitted to the Texas bar in 1883 and went into private practice.

=== Politics ===
In 1886, Johnson was elected to the Texas House of Representatives. He campaigned as a stump speaker in 1887 against prohibition. He later reversed his position on prohibition. He served one term in the house before being elected to the Texas State Senate in 1888, where he served until 1892. In 1891, Johnson helped frame a bill to establish the Texas Railroad Commission.

In 1910, Johnson unsuccessfully ran for governor against Oscar Branch Colquitt in the 1910 Texas gubernatorial election.

In 1912, he served as a delegate to the Democratic National Convention in Baltimore.

Johnson was appointed as a solicitor in the United States Department of State by President Woodrow Wilson in 1914. He advised Secretary of State William Jennings Bryan and handled citizens' claims for losses during World War I. He resigned from this position in 1917.

In 1927, he was appointed as a commissioner of the Texas State Highway Department by Governor Dan Moody.

== Personal life ==
Johnson was a Methodist and a member of Marvin Methodist Episcopal Church in Tyler, sometimes serving as a lay preacher.

On May 8, 1889, he married Eliza Sophia "Birdie" Robertson. She died in 1926. He married a second time, on August 2, 1928, to Ethel Frances Hilton.

Johnson died on March 17, 1933 in Tyler.
