= 1910 Texas gubernatorial election =

- November 8, 1910
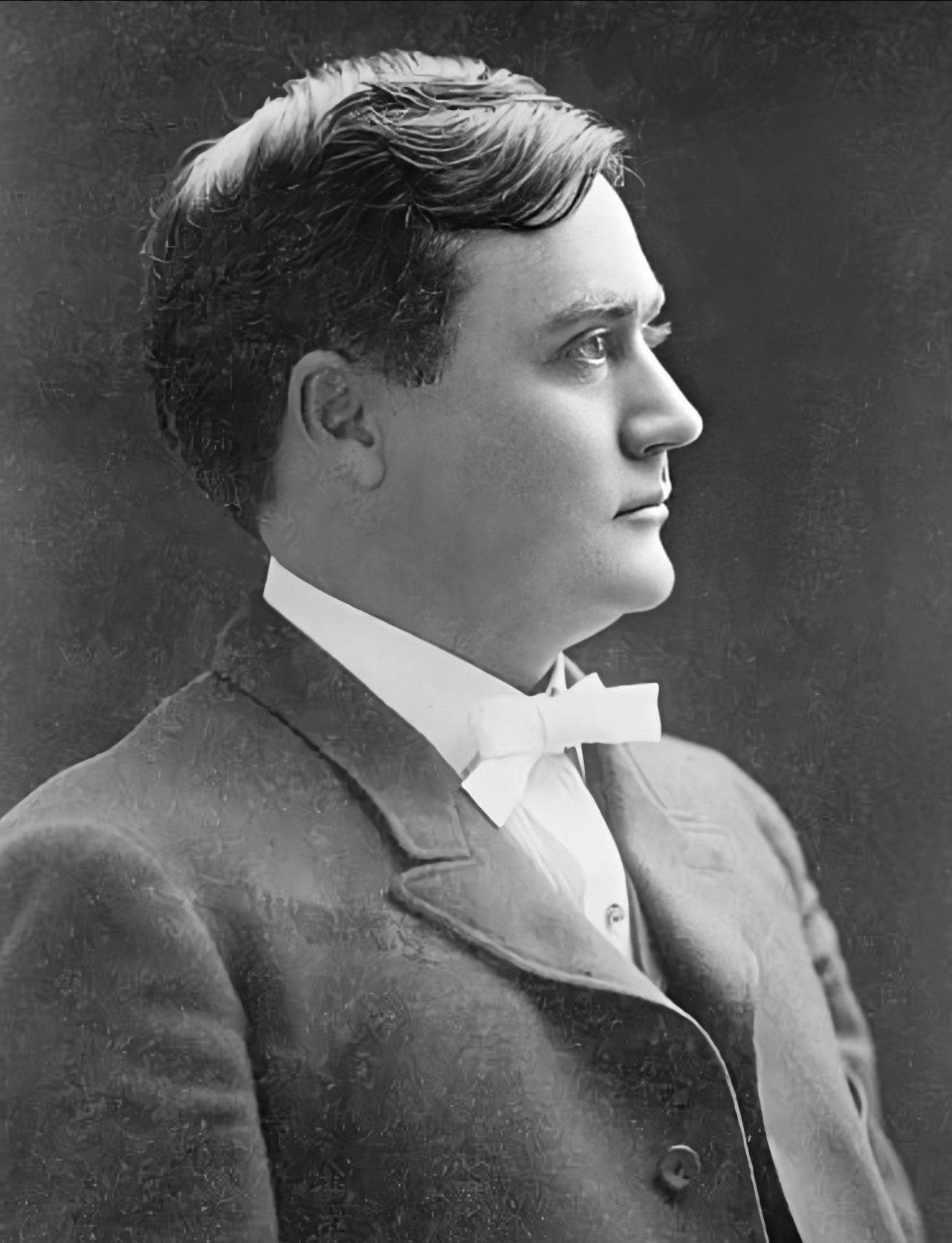

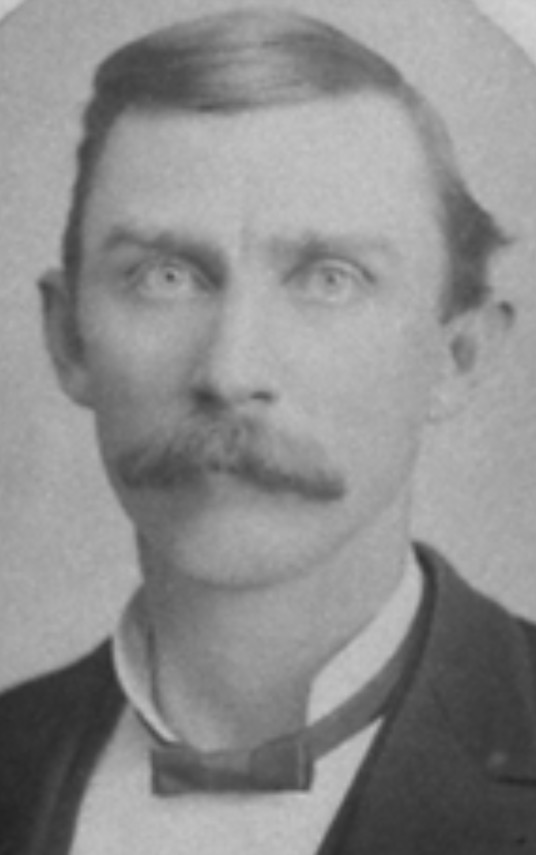

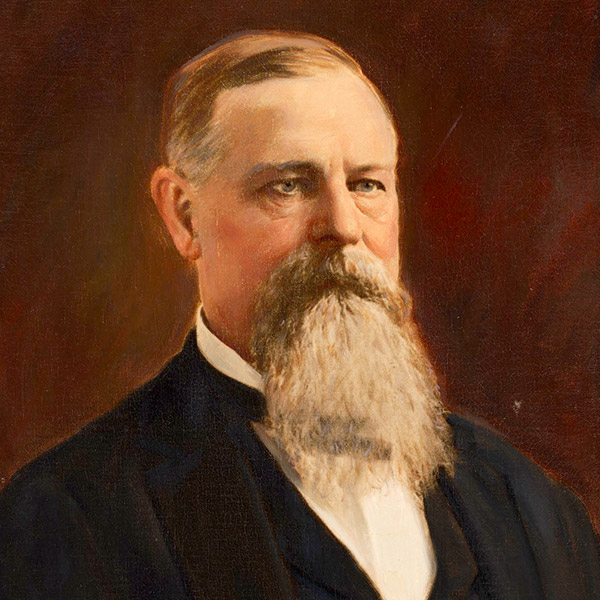
Nominee	Oscar Branch Colquitt	J. O. Terrell	Reddin Andrews
Party	Democratic	Republican	Socialist
Popular vote	174,596	26,191	11,538
Percentage	79.79%	11.97%	5.27%
- County results Colquitt: 30–40% 40–50% 50–60% 60–70% 70–80% 80–90% 90–100% Terrell: 50–60% 60–70% 90–100% No Data/Vote
Governor before election
Oscar Branch Colquitt
Democratic
Elected Governor
Oscar Branch Colquitt
Democratic

The 1910 Texas gubernatorial election was held on November 8, 1910, in order to elect the Governor of Texas. Democrat Oscar Branch Colquitt, a member of the Texas Railroad Commission, won re-election to his first term as Governor of Texas.

== Democratic primary ==
=== Candidates ===
- Oscar Branch Colquitt, member of the Texas Railroad Commission
- Robert Vance Davidson, Texas Attorney General and former State Senator from Galveston
- Cone Johnson, Tyler attorney and former State Senator
- J. Marion Jones
- William Poindexter, Cleburne judge, prohibition activist, and candidate for U.S. House in 1902 and 1904

In the early 20th century, winning the Democratic primary was tantamount to election, as Texas was a solidly Democratic state. However, before 1918, the primary was conducted under a single-round, first-past-the-post system, meaning that one did not have to achieve a majority of the votes to be nominated; a plurality under 50% was sufficient. Colquitt ran against three major opponents in the primary: William Poindexter, Cone Johnson, and R.V. Davidson. Colquitt finished ahead of the other candidates with 41% of the vote and a plurality, securing him the nomination and effectively, the governorship.

=== Primary results ===
Democratic primary results
Party	Candidate	Votes	%
Democratic	Oscar Branch Colquitt	146,871	40.97
Democratic	William Poindexter	80,060	22.33
Democratic	Cone Johnson	76,268	21.28
Democratic	Robert V. Davidson	53,367	14.89
Democratic	J. Marion Jones	1,910	0.53
Total votes		358,476	100.00

== General election ==
=== Candidates ===
- Reddin Andrews, former president of Baylor University (Socialist)
- Oscar Branch Colquitt, member of the Texas Railroad Commission (Democratic)
- Andrew Jackson Houston, United States Marshal for the Eastern District of Texas (Prohibition)
- Carl Schmidt (Socialist Labor)
- J.O. Terrell (Republican)

=== Campaign ===
Colquitt faced scattered opposition in the general election, and defeated his opponents with ease, winning just under 80% of the popular vote and keeping the governor's mansion in Democratic hands.

=== Results ===
Texas Gubernatorial Election, 1910
Party	Candidate	Votes	%	±%
Democratic	Oscar Branch Colquitt	174,596	79.79	▲7.00
Republican	J.O. Terrell	26,191	11.97	▼12.40
Socialist	Reddin Andrews	11,538	5.27	▲2.58
Prohibition	Andrew Jackson Houston	6,052	2.77	▲2.72
Socialist Labor	Carl Schmidt	436	0.20	▲0.12
Total votes		218,813	100.00	
Democratic hold				
