= ERAmerica =

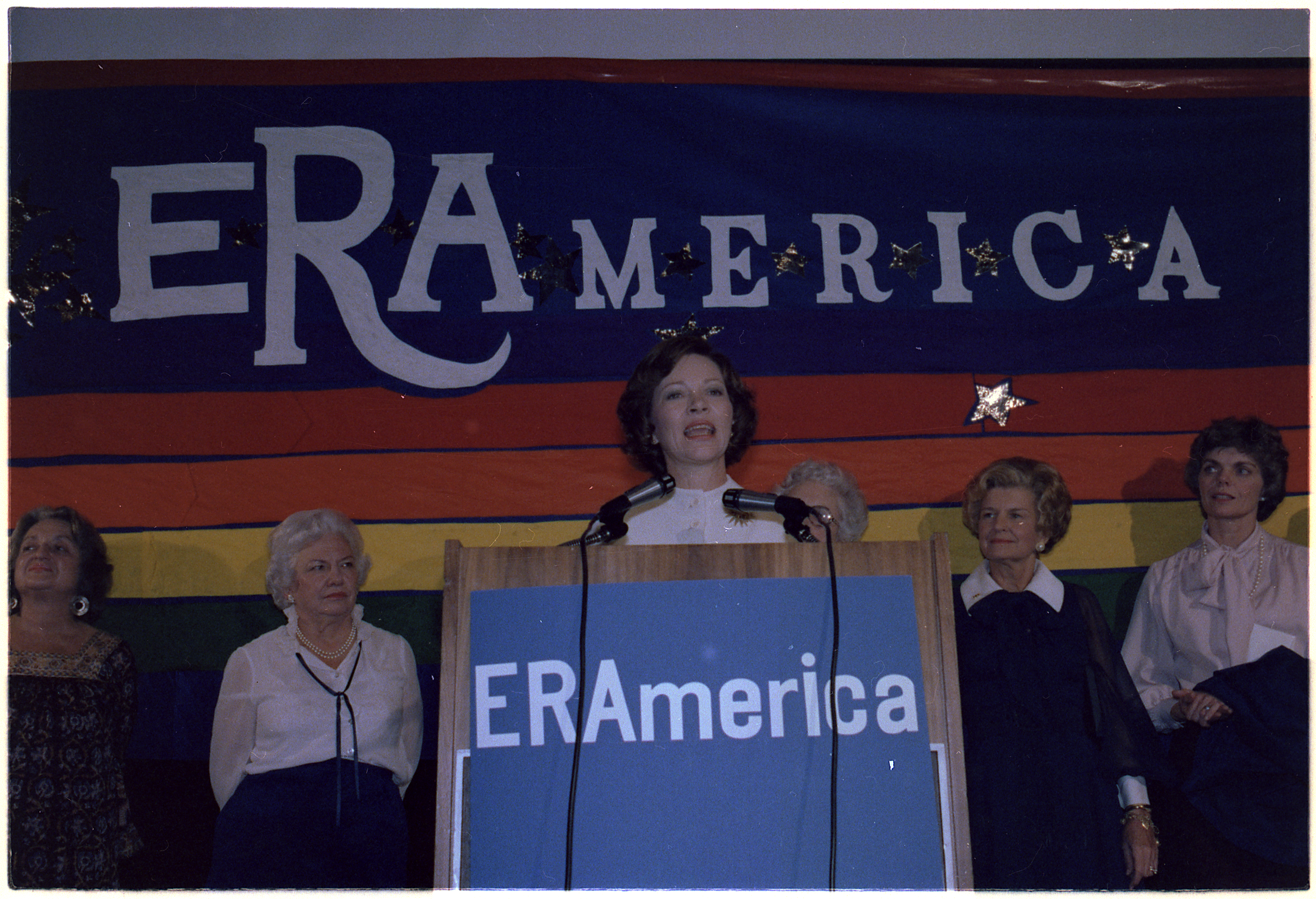
- Rosalynn Carter speaks in front of an ERAmerica banner at the 1977 National Women's Conference
- Formation: 1976
- Founded at: Washington, D.C.
- Dissolved: 1982
- Purpose: Ratification of the Equal Rights Amendment
- Location: United States
- Leader: Liz Carpenter and Elly Peterson

ERAmerica was a coalition of organizations fighting for the ratification of the Equal Rights Amendment in the 1970s. The organization was bipartisan as Democrat Liz Carpenter and Republican Elly Peterson led the organization as co-chairs.

== Origins ==
ERAmerica was founded as a coalition of groups in 1976 and consisted of over 200 organizations. The headquarters were based in Washington, D.C. The purpose of the organization as to seek ratification of the Equal Rights Amendment (ERA). The group was ultimately unsuccessful after the ERA failed in 1982.

== Leadership ==
ERAmerica was a bipartisan organization. Liz Carpenter was a Democrat and Elly Peterson was a long time member of the Republican Party. Both women were founders of the National Women's Political Caucus.

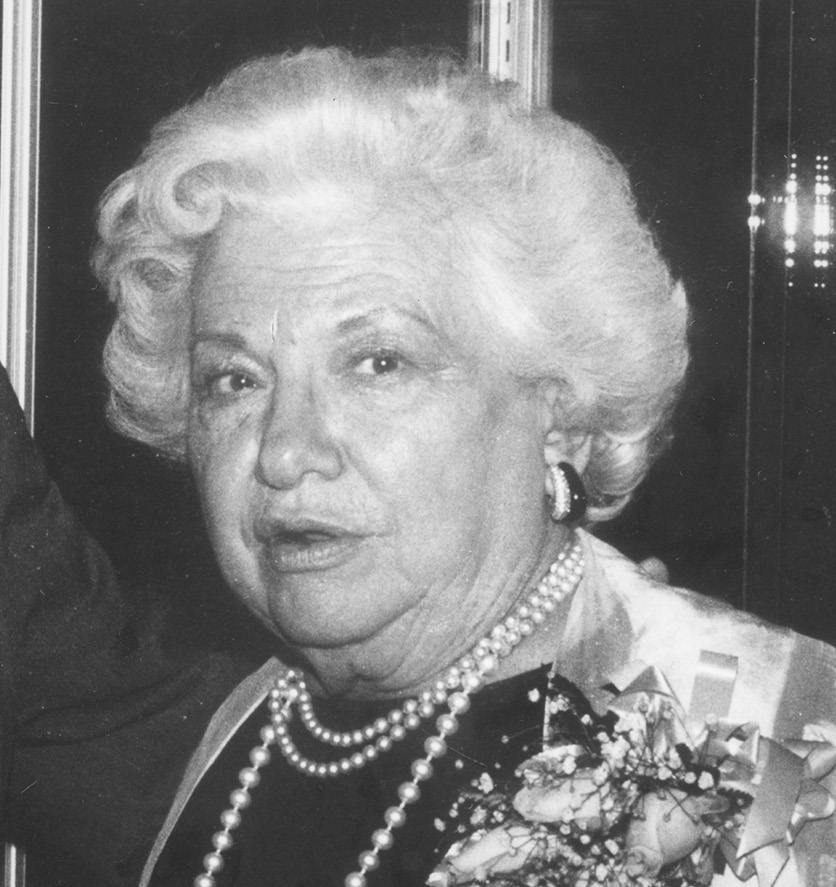
Liz Carpenter, co-chair of ERAmerica

In 1976, Jane Wells served as campaign director of ERAmerica. In the early 1980s, Mary Hatwood Futrell served as president. In 1982, Kathleen Currie served as director of public relations.

== Member organizations ==
Groups affiliated with ERAmerica included Catholics Act for ERA, Housewives for ERA, Common Cause, Girl Scouts, and the NAACP.

== ERAmerica Report ==
In the early 1980s, ERAmerica published a newsletter known as the ERAmerica Report. In the May 1981 edition, they noted the ERA and abortion were separate issues.

== Fundraising for the cause ==
=== 1977 ===
In 1977, ERAmerica raised $100,000 at the International Women's Year Conference in Houston.

=== 1981 ===
In 1981, ERAmerica held a luncheon in Michigan where First Lady Helen Milliken spoke. Karen Street from Birmingham attended this event and told the press, "This is one of the best things I've ever done. I'm so appreciative of the women who worked for the vote I have today. Some day, I hope women will appreciate what we are doing for the ERA. I have the time to devote to this. Many other women who need it most don't have the time I do."

== Donations to candidates ==
In 1982, ERAmerica donated $38,650 to legislative candidates.

== See also ==
- Liz Carpenter
- Billie Jean King
- Elly Maude Peterson
- Helen Reddy
- Jane Horton Wells
