= 1908 Texas gubernatorial election =

- November 8, 1908
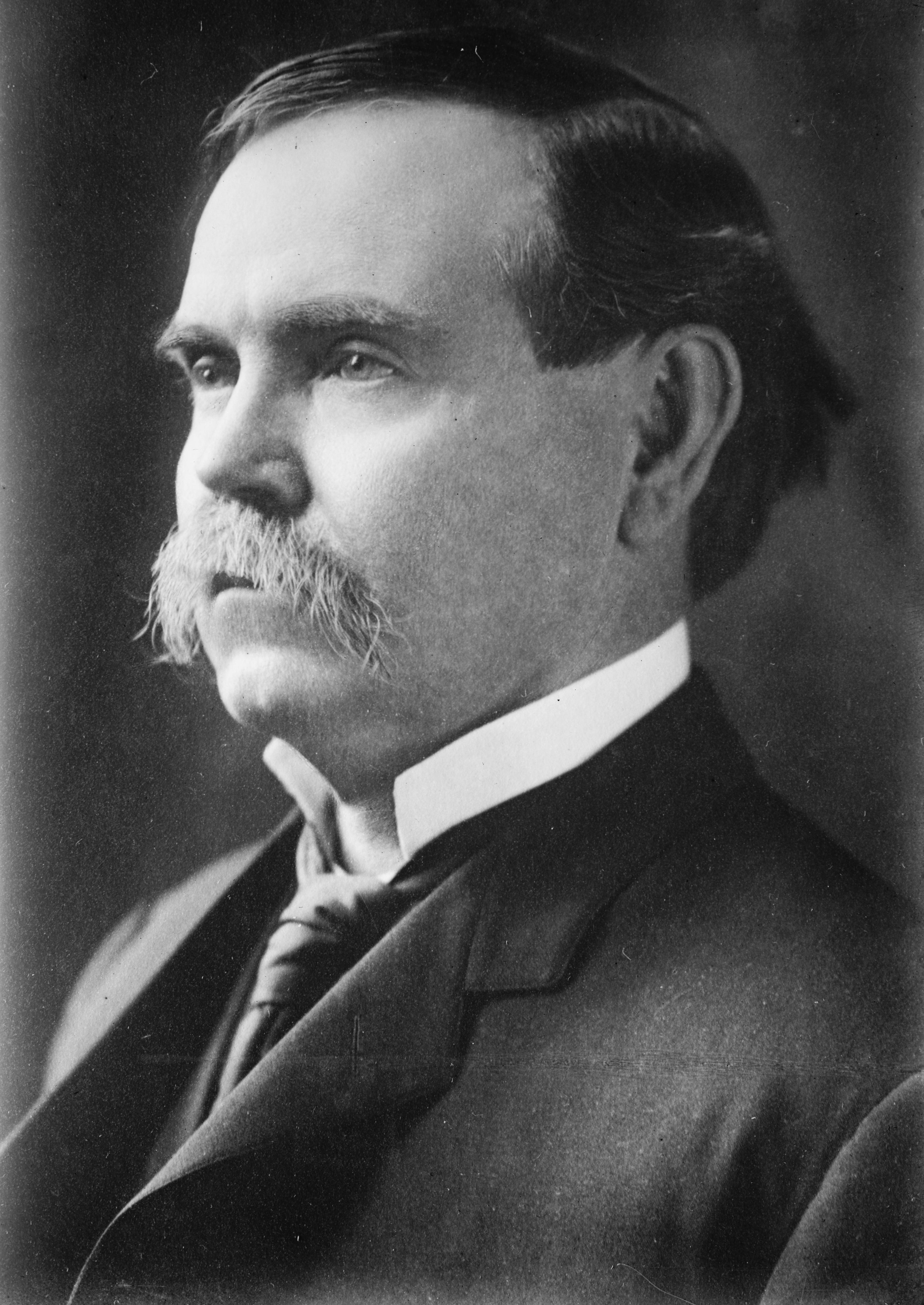

Candidate	Thomas Mitchell Campbell	John N. Simpson
Party	Democratic	Republican
Popular vote	218,956	73,305
Percentage	72.79%	24.37%
- County results Campbell: 40–50% 50–60% 60–70% 70–80% 80–90% 90–100% Simpson: 50–60% 60–70% 70–80% 80–90% 90–100% No Data/Vote
Governor before election
Thomas Mitchell Campbell
Democratic
Governor-elect
Thomas Mitchell Campbell
Democratic

The 1908 Texas gubernatorial election was held to elect the Governor of Texas. Governor Thomas Mitchell Campbell was re-elected to a second term in office.

Campbell defeated State Representative Robert R. Williams in the Democratic primary by a wide margin, which was tantamount to victory in the general election.

== Democratic primary ==
=== Candidates ===
- Thomas Mitchell Campbell, incumbent Governor
- Robert R. Williams, State Representative from Hopkins County

=== Results ===
1908 Democratic gubernatorial primary
Party	Candidate	Votes	%
Democratic	Thomas Mitchell Campbell (incumbent)	206,038	63.32%
Democratic	Robert R. Williams	119,378	36.68%
Total votes		325,416	100.00%

== General election ==
=== Candidates ===
- Thomas Mitchell Campbell, incumbent Governor (Democratic)
- W. B. Cook (Socialist Labor)
- Ephraim Charles Heath, former State Representative from Rockwall County and nominee in 1890 (Prohibition)
- Charles L. Martin (Independence)
- John C. Rhodes (Socialist)
- John Nicholas Simpson, banker and cattleman (Republican)

Charles L. Martin was a late substitute as the Independence candidate, so his name did not appear on the ballot.

=== Results ===
1908 Texas gubernatorial election
Party	Candidate	Votes	%	±%
Democratic	Thomas Mitchell Campbell	218,956	72.79%	▼4.80
Republican	John N. Simpson	73,305	24.37%	▲12.00
Socialist	J. C. Rhodes	8,100	2.69%	▲1.15
Socialist Labor	W. B. Cook	234	0.08%	▼0.06
Prohibition	Ephraim C. Heath	148	0.05%	▼1.10
Independence	Charles L. Martin	58	0.02%	N/A
Total votes		300,801	100.00%	
