= Sterling C. Robertson =

American politician (1785–1842)

- Born: October 2, 1785; Nashville, North Carolina (now Nashville, Tennessee), U.S.
- Died: March 4, 1842 (aged 56); Robertson County, Republic of Texas
- Resting place: Texas State Cemetery; 30°15′59″N 97°43′36″W
- Children: 2, including Elijah Sterling Clack Robertson

Sterling Clack Robertson (1785–1842) was an empresario from Tennessee, during Mexican Texas. He introduced 600 families into Robertson's Colony. Robertson was also an elected delegate to the Washington-on-the-Brazos convention, signing both the Texas Declaration of Independence and the Constitution of the Republic of Texas. He became a senator during the first two sessions of the Congress of the Republic of Texas.

== Early life in Tennessee ==
Sterling Clack Robertson was born one of five children on October 2, 1785, into a wealthy and influential slave-holding family in Nashville, Tennessee. Robertson received a private education from Judge John McNairy by request through Elijah Robertson's will and through his family connections. His father was Captain Elijah Robertson, who left Brunswick County, Virginia, in the 18th century to join family members and other early white settlers in Tennessee. Sterling's mother was Sarah Maclin Robertson. His paternal uncle James Robertson was an explorer known as the Father of Tennessee. His descendants were accomplished persons. Son Elijah Sterling Clack Robertson became a Colonel in the Republic of Texas militia, and built a plantation in Salado, Texas. Robertson's great-great-granddaughter was author Liz Carpenter, who was a press spokesperson for both President Lyndon B. Johnson and later for Ladybird Johnson. Robertson was a gray-eyed, sandy-haired man who stood 5 feet 10 inches (1.78 m). He was known to be a hot-tempered ladies man who dressed in expensive tailored clothes. As a youth, Robertson was convicted of manslaughter of one of his cousins in Tennessee, but did not serve his five-month sentence until April 6 to September 1, 1832.

== Robertson's colony ==
Under Mexican Texas, Robertson received an empresario contract to settle 800 families in Texas.

== Texas Rangers and public service ==
In 1835, empresario Robertson formed his own rangers company to deal with Indian depredations at Robertson's Colony. Robertson was a delegate to the convention at Washington-on-the-Brazos. He signed both the Texas Declaration of Independence and the Constitution of the Republic of Texas. He was also a Senator at the first two sessions of the Congress of the Republic of Texas.

== Personal life and death ==
According to his descendants, Robertson never married. However, he sired two sons by two different women. In addition to Elijah Sterling Clack Robertson with Frances King, he also fathered James Maclin Robertson with Rachael Smith. On December 18, 1837, Republic of Texas Senator Robertson got legislation passed that acknowledged both sons as his legitimate issue, and legally entitled to inherit his estate. The legislation was signed into law by Republic President Sam Houston:

Be it enacted, by the senate and house of representatives of the Republic of Texas, in congress assembled, That Elijah Sterling Clack Robertson, son of Sterling C. Robertson and Fanny King, :and James Maclin Robertson, son of Sterling C. Robertson and Rachael Smith, be, and are hereby declared legitimate children, and capable in law of inheriting their parents' property, in the same manner as if they had been born in lawful wedlock

—
Joseph Rowe-Speaker of the House of Representatives
S. H. Everitt-President pro tem of the Senate
Sam Houston-President
Approved, Dec. 18, 1837.

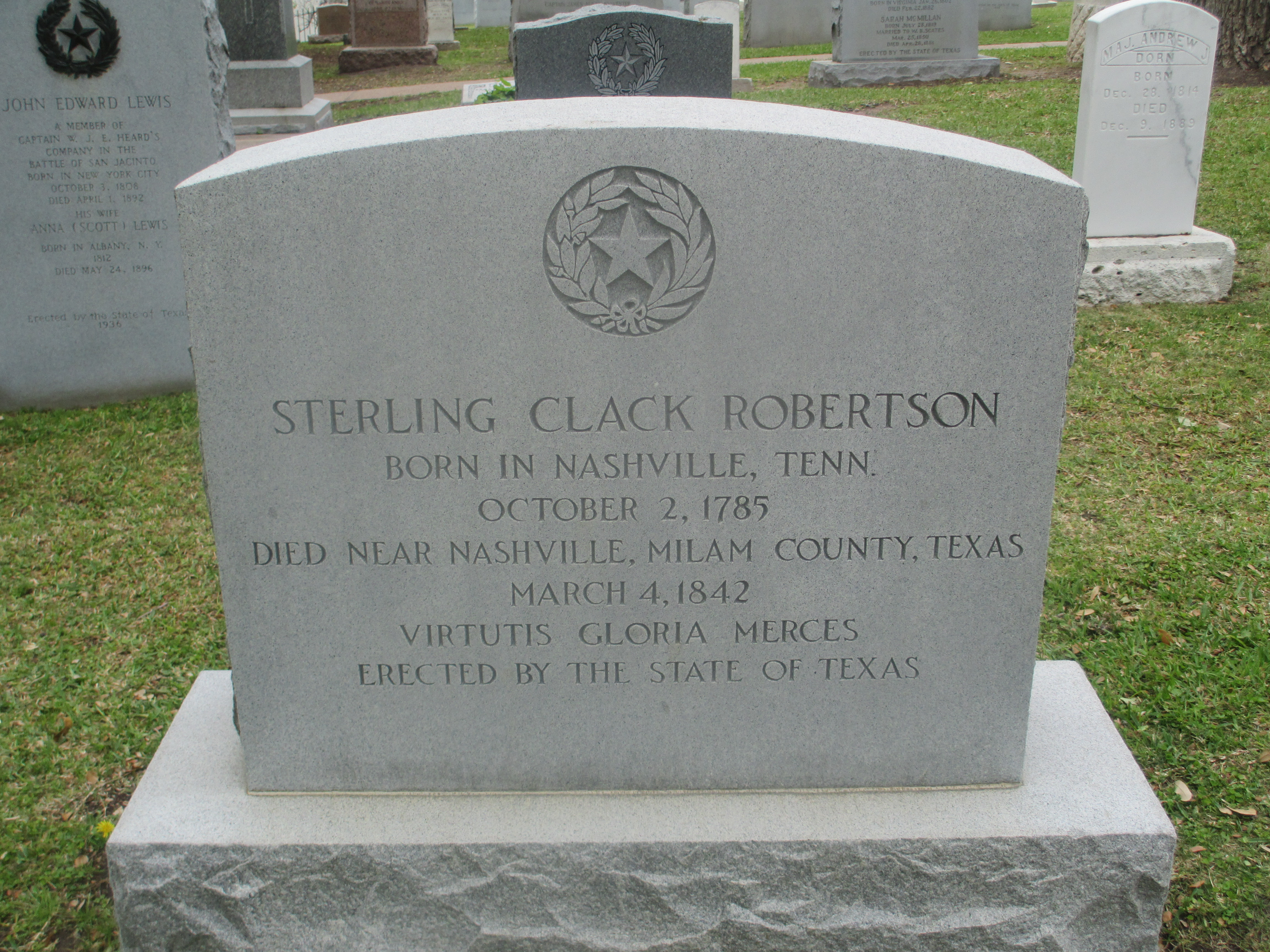
Robertson gravestone at Texas State Cemetery in Austin

Sterling Clack Robertson died of pneumonia in Robertson County on March 4, 1842. His remains were removed to Austin and reinterred in the Texas State Cemetery on December 29, 1935.

== See also ==
- Felix Robertson
