= Thomas Mitchell Campbell =

Governor of Texas from 1907 to 1911

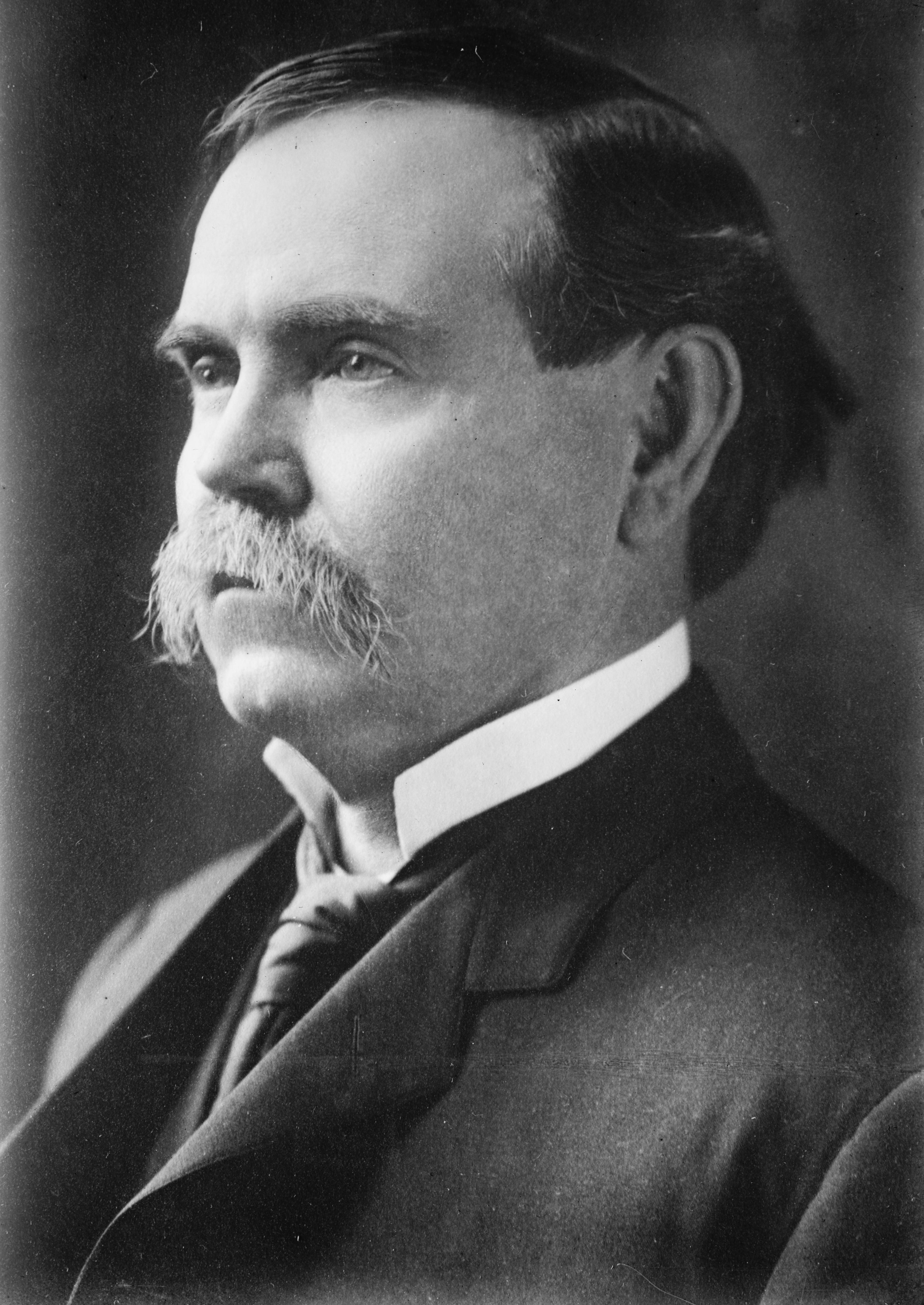

24th Governor of Texas
- In office January 15, 1907 – January 17, 1911
- Lieutenant: Asbury Bascom Davidson
- Preceded by: S. W. T. Lanham
- Succeeded by: Oscar Branch Colquitt

Personal details
- Born: April 22, 1856 Rusk, Texas, U.S.
- Died: April 1, 1923 (aged 66) Galveston, Texas, U.S.
- Party: Democratic
- Spouse: Fannie Irene Bruner
- Children: 5
- Parent(s): Thomas Duncan and Rachel Moore Campbell; Cynthia Divernia Carroll Campbell (stepmother)

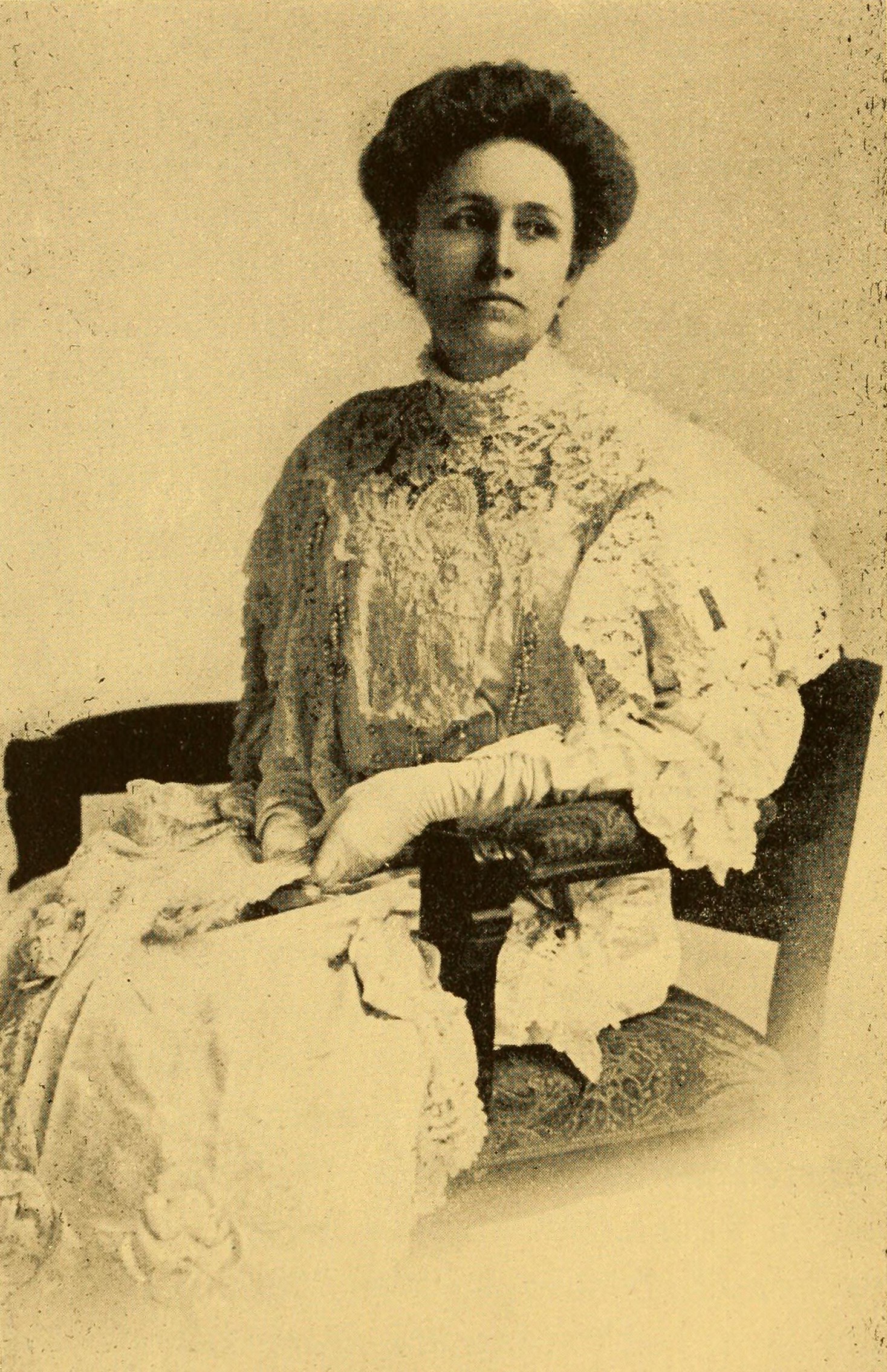
Fannie Bruner Campbell

Thomas Mitchell Campbell (April 22, 1856 – April 1, 1923) was a progressive member of the Democratic Party who served as the 24th governor of Texas, serving two terms from 1907 to 1911. He was also an attorney and businessman, working as a manager for the International-Great Northern Railroad in Palestine, Texas before entering politics.

== Life ==
Campbell was born in Rusk in Cherokee County in East Texas, the son of Thomas Duncan and Rachel (Moore) Campbell. He attended school at Rusk and entered Trinity University in 1873 to study law. He was unable to support himself and withdrew after a year.

Campbell went to work in the Gregg County clerk's office and continued his studies at night. In 1878, he was admitted to the Texas bar. In the same year, he married Fannie Irene Bruner of Shreveport, Louisiana. Her father, William Bruner, had served as a captain from Mississippi in the Confederate States Army. After the war, he settled in Shreveport. There he became a landholder and was elected as city comptroller in Shreveport.

Campbell practiced law in Longview until he became involved with the troubled International-Great Northern Railroad in 1889. He became its court-appointed receiver in 1891 and moved his family to Palestine. The next year, after lifting the line from bankruptcy, he remained in Palestine as the general manager of the railroad.

== Political career ==
Campbell distrusted monopolistic big business and sympathized with trade unions. He shared many of the reformist political views of former Texas governor James Stephen Hogg. In 1897, Campbell resigned from the railroad and became active in Democratic Party politics. At Hogg's urging, he decided to run for governor.

Campbell was elected governor in 1906. In his two terms in office, 1907–1911, Campbell initiated a number of reforms including various labor measures.

Shocked when the Slocum massacre broke out on July 29, 1910, when a large mob of whites attacked blacks in and around Slocum in his home Anderson County, Campbell ordered the state militia to the area to suppress the violence. Twenty-two unarmed blacks were documented as killed in the white riot, but the death toll was said to be much higher. Many black families fled the area, losing all their property.

Campbell's most significant legislation centered on prison reform, as Campbell's administration ended the convict lease system for inmates and implemented more humane treatment of prisoners. Under Campbell, many state agencies were established, including the Department of Insurance and Banking, the Bureau of Labor Statistics, the State Board of Health, and the Texas State Library.

Campbell returned to private law practice in Palestine, but remained active in Democratic politics. In 1916, he ran unsuccessfully against his fellow Democrat Charles Culberson for the United States Senate. Well into the 1960s, Texas was essentially a one-party state, with the only competitive contests taking place in the Democratic primaries.

He died in Galveston and is interred in Palestine, Texas. His grave is marked with a tall white obelisk.

Party political offices
Preceded by S. W. T. Lanham	Democratic nominee for Governor of Texas; 1906, 1908	Succeeded by Oscar Branch Colquitt
Political offices
Preceded by S. W. T. Lanham	Governor of Texas; 1907-1911	Succeeded by Oscar Branch Colquitt
