= Reddin Andrews =

American college president

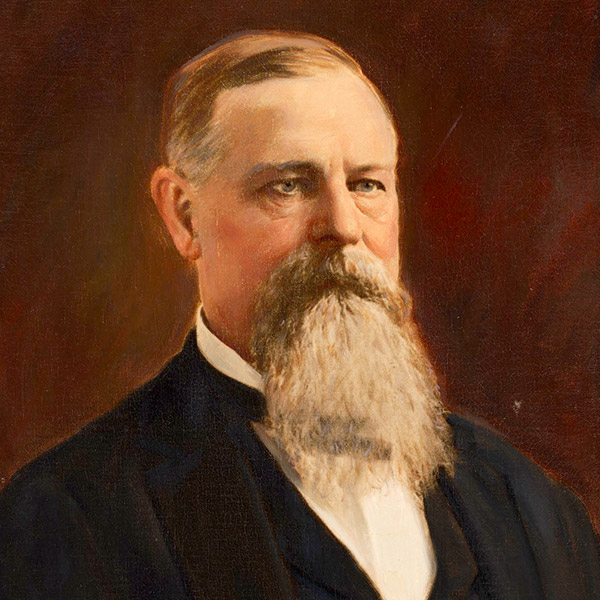
- Born: January 18, 1848; La Grange, Texas
- Died: August 16, 1923 (aged 75)
- Occupation: Baptist pastor
- Known for: the president of Baylor University from 1885 to 1886

Reddin Andrews (January 18, 1848 – August 16, 1923) was a two time Texas gubernatorial candidate and the president of Baylor University from 1885 to 1886.

== Biography ==
Reddin Andrews was born in La Grange, Texas, on January 18, 1848. He fought for the Confederacy as a scout and a courier during the American Civil War.

In 1871, he graduated from Baylor University as a valedictorian. From 1871 to 1873, he attended the Greenville Seminary in Greenville, South Carolina. He became a pastor in Navasota, Texas, and preached in Millican, Hempstead, Calvert, Tyler, Lampasas, Bastrop, Webberville, Hillsboro, Rockwall and Lovelady.

He married Elizabeth Eddins in 1874 and they had nine children. From 1871 to 1878, he was a professor at Baylor University. In 1878, he became the principal of the Masonic Institute in Round Rock, Texas.

He was an editor to John B. Link's Texas Baptist Herald. He returned to Baylor University to serve as its president from 1885 to 1886, as it was merged with Waco University. In 1886, he helped merge the Baptist State Convention and Baptist General Association into the Baptist General Convention of Texas. In 1889, he moved to Atlanta, Georgia, to edit W.T. Martin's Gospel Standard and Expositor.

In 1892, he moved to Belton, Texas, and worked for the People's Party. In 1907, he was the editor of Sword and Shield in Tyler. In 1910 and 1912, he ran for Texas governor as the nominee of the Socialist Party. In 1910, he came in third place with just over 5% of the vote, and in 1912 came in second with over 8%, but both times lost overwhelmingly to the Democratic nominee. In 1916, he moved to Lawton, Oklahoma, where he died in 1923.

== Bibliography ==
- Poems (1911)
