= Texas State Federation of Labor =

Former affiliate of the American Federation of Labor

The Texas State Federation of Labor (TSFL) was the Texas affiliate of the American Federation of Labor (AFL). It was formed in 1900 and disbanded in July 1957, when it merged with the Texas State CIO Council to form the Texas AFL-CIO.

== History ==
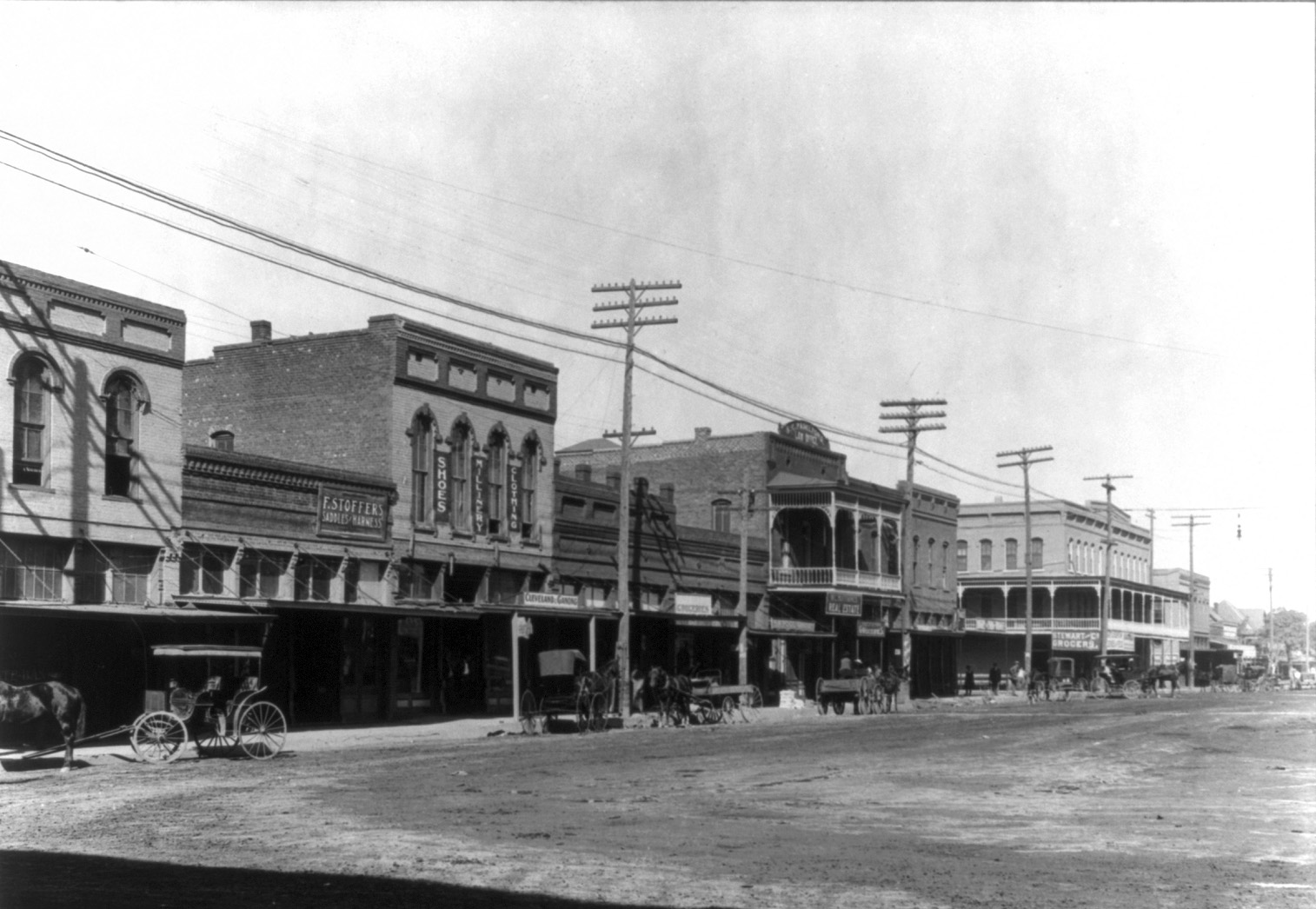
Main Street in Cleburne in the 1910s

After several attempts to form a statewide labor organization had foundered, a convention was called at Cleburne, Texas by the Clebourne Trades Council on January 15, 1900. This first convention was attended by 23 delegates representing seven cities and a membership of 8,475.

Despite the organization's name, the TSFL did not receive a charter from the national AFL until 1903. This was because the TSFL was working with the railroad brotherhoods to secure desired legislation and the brotherhoods would not work with a union that accepted the leadership of the national organization. In 1903 the railroad brotherhoods agreed to join with the State Federation and formed the Joint Labor Legislative board of Texas.

== Organization ==
The original Constitution provided from semi-annual conventions. Four such conventions were held, each attended by 20–30 delegates. However, the Federation soon decided to make the conventions annual and to expand the basis for delegates. Each central body was then allowed three delegates and each local one delegate per hundred members or major fraction thereof. This system of representation would remain unchanged into the early 1940s, except for the addition of three delegates from each union label league. The first convention held on this basis was the fifth state convention, held in Fort Worth in 1903. This was also the first convention to have its proceedings published.

=== Presidents ===
The presidents of the Texas State Federation of Labor from its foundation to 1941.

- 1900–1902 James P. Grimes, Galveston
- 1902–1904 Max Andrew, Houston
- 1905–1906 Ed Cunningham, Bridgeport, Texas
- 1907–1909 J. H. Fricke, Galveston
- 1910–1911 W. L. Hoefgen, San Antonio
- 1912–1918 Ed Cunningham, Bridgeport, Texas
- 1919–1923 George Slater, Galveston
- 1924–1926 Herman Katchel, Denison, Texas
- 1927–1928 George A. Wilson, Houston
- 1929–1933 J. W. Parks, Dallas
- 1934 T. J. Bresler, Borger, Texas
- 1935–1936 W. B. Arnold, San Antonio
- 1937–1940 A. S. MacBride, Houston

=== Membership and affiliations ===
Membership figures for the TSFL are fragmentary, but the following numbers are available.

Year	Affiliated Unions	Members
1906	158	9,171
1907	142	9,531
1908	172	10,691
1909	191	11,500
1910	232	12,478
1911	265	14,470
1912	300	17,108
1916	351	n/a
1917	384	n/a
1918	437	28,000
1919	512	42,000

Between 1920 and 1921, the Federation gained 6 centrals and 38 locals. Between the 1921 and the 1922 conventions, 67 unions affiliated with the Federation. Between the 1925 and 1926 conventions 50 locals and 2 centrals affiliated, gaining the Federation 3,859 members. There were over 25,000 members in 1927. Between the 1927 and 1928 conventions, 76 locals and 5 centrals affiliated, representing a gain of 3,463. Between the 1928 and 1929 conventions, 28 locals and 1 central organization affiliated. From 1933 to 1934 4 centrals and 102 locals affiliated representing a gain of 4,934.

By the mid 1950s, union membership in Texas stood at about 375,000 or 17% of the non-agricultural working population. Of these, approximately 235,000 were affiliated to the AFL unions.

== Publications ==
- Public relations for Texas labor Austin, Tex. : Texas State Federation of Labor, 1945
- The heavy load, anti-labor laws passed by the 50th Texas Legislature. Austin, Texas State Federation of Labor, 1947
- What price wetbacks? Austin, Tex. : The Forum, 1953 (with the American G.I. Forum)
- Let's take a look at the proposed "Loyalty Review Board" Austin : The Federation, 1954
- Down in the Valley; a supplementary report on developments in the wetback and bracero situation of the Lower Rio Grande Valley of Texas since publication of "What price wetbacks?" Austin 1955
- Lets talk politics: then do something about it! Austin, Texas : Texas State Federation of Labor, undated.
