= Robertson's Colony =

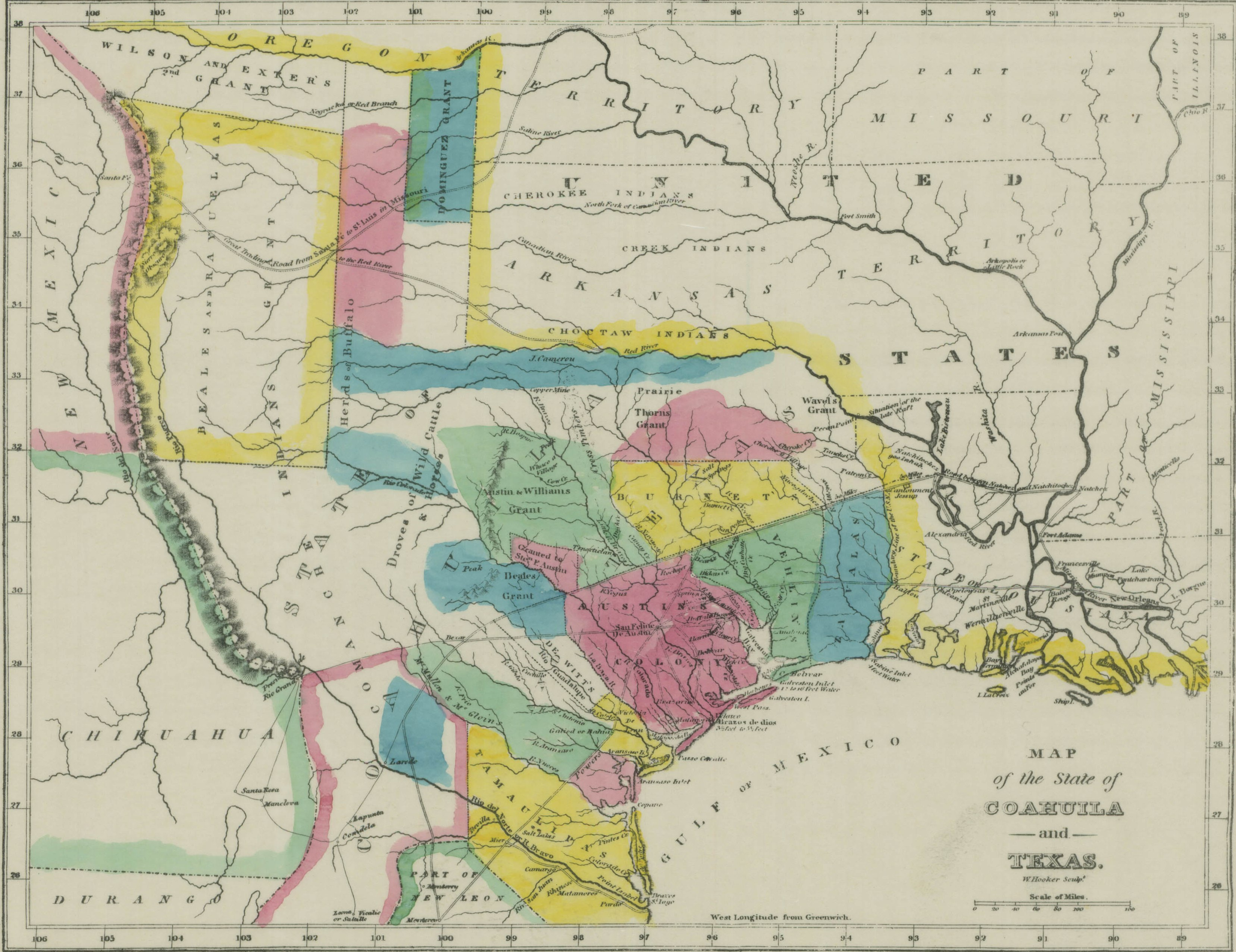
1833 map depicting Robertson's Colony in green, north-central Texas, as Austin & Williams Grant

Robertson's Colony was an empresario colonization effort during the Mexican Texas period. It is named after Sterling C. Robertson, but had previously been known by other names. It has also been referred to as the Nashville Colony, after the Tennessee city where the effort originated, the Texas Association, the Upper Colony, and Leftwich's Grant, named after early colonizer Robert Leftwich. The eventual contract spread over an area that includes all or part of thirty present-day counties in Texas.

== Counties within Robertson's Colony ==
Thirty present-day counties were part of the colony. The original 1824 contract secured by Robert Leftwich included all or part of seventeen present-day Texas counties. The 1827 transfer of the contract from Leftwich to the Texas Association added territory that included all or part of an additional thirteen counties.

- Bastrop
- Bell
- Bosque
- Brazos
- Brown
- Burleson
- Burnet
- Callahan
- Comanche
- Coryell
- Eastland
- Erath
- Falls
- Hamilton
- Hill
- Hood
- Jack
- Johnson
- Lampasas
- Lee
- Limestone
- McLennan
- Milam
- Mills
- Palo Pinto
- Parker
- Robertson
- Somervell
- Stephens
- Williamson

== Colonization laws ==
- January 4, 1823, the Imperial Colonization Law under Emperor Agustín de Iturbide. The law established the responsibilities and rewards of the Empresario system of recruiting the settlers, the apportionment of land, required adherence to Catholicism, citizenship requirements, and the authority structure within the settlements. Iturbide abdicated March 19, 1823, nullifying the new law.
- August 14, 1824, the General Colonization Law, opened settlement by non-Mexicans, and guarantee basic rights therein.
- March 25, 1825, the State Colonization Law of Coahuila y Tejas, established colonization requirements of Texas, while deferring to Mexican federal law.
- The Law of April 6, 1830 was passed to stem the tide of Anglo immigration, hoping to prevent Texas being annexed by the United States. Article Eleven of the law specifically addresses: "citizens of foreign countries lying adjacent to Mexican territory are prohibited from settling as colonists in the states or territories of the republic adjoining such countries. Those contracts of colonization, the terms of which are opposed to the present article, and which are not yet complied with, shall consequently be suspended."

== The Texas Association ==
On March 2, 1822, a group of seventy individuals known as the Texas Association met in Nashville, Tennessee to draft a letter to the Mexican government, petitioning for colonization. This group included Dr. Felix Robertson, president of the association, Sam Houston, Ira Ingram, Robert Leftwich, Andrew Erwin and Sterling C. Robertson. The association advanced Leftwich and Erwin a total of $4,000 to be used for expenses in presenting the petition to the Mexican government. After escorting Leftwich to Mexico City, Erwin returned to Tennessee. Leftwich stayed in Mexico City to pursue the colonization effort.

== The Leftwich grant ==
In the two-year wait in Mexico City before the passage of its General Colonization Law, Leftwich had depleted the monies advanced to him by the Texas Association. On October 20, 1824, Leftwich used his personal funds and petitioned the government in his own name, for settlement of 800 families. His petition to settle the families along the Brazos River was granted on April 15, 1825. The present-day Texas counties covered by this original Leftwich grant were Bastrop, Bell, Brazos, Burleson, Burnet, Comanche, Coryell, Falls, Hamilton, Lampasas, Lee, Limestone, McLennan, Milam, Mills, Robertson, and Williamson. In exchange for an additional $14,000 (equivalent in 2015 to approximately $295,000) Leftwich sold the colonization contract to the Texas Association on August 8, 1825. The deal retained Leftwich as the empresario agent between the association and the Mexican government. Dr. Felix Robertson and a group of advance men made an exploratory trip to Texas to lay the groundwork for the colonization. Leftwich dropped out of the colonization effort due to health issues.

== Nashville company ==
On March 8, 1827, the Texas Association petitioned the government to transfer the colonization contract to the association, and recognize Hosea H. League as their representative. In 1826, League had joined the colonization efforts of Stephen F. Austin. In January 1827, League led settlers to join the Green DeWitt group. In April of the same year, he led settlers to join Austin's colony.

League empowered Austin to act on his behalf in regards to the association's petition. In the paperwork, Austin referred to the association as "the company from Nashville". On October 15, the government granted Austin's petition on behalf of the Nashville Company. It extended the boundary to include the present-day Texas counties of Bosque, Brown, Callahan, Eastland, Erath, Hill, Hood, Jack, Johnson, Palo Pinto, Parker, Somervell, and Stephens. This brought the total to all or part of 30 present-day Texas counties.

== Upper colony ==
In 1830, Sterling C. Robertson of the Texas Association, along with Alexander Thomson, Jr. began recruiting settlers for the Texas colonization. The new Law of April 6, 1830, however, nullified the colonization contract with the Texas Association. Stephen F. Austin was able to get an exemption for his colony and that of Green DeWitt. Robertson asked for Austin's assistance in getting an exemption for the association's colonization efforts. Although Austin initially agreed to help Robertson, he and his secretary Samuel May Williams applied for a colonization grant of the same area in their own names. Their justification in the petition was that Robertson had not begun colonization. Austin's petition was granted on February 25, 1831. Under the new contract, the area was referred to as the Upper Colony of the Austin contract. By 1834, Austin and Williams had also failed to colonize the area.

== Robertson's colony ==
Coahuila y Tejas governor Agustín Viesca cancelled the Austin-Williams contract on May 22, 1834, and granted a new contract to Sterling C. Robertson, to complete the contract of 800 families before April 29, 1838. The legal description being:

Beginning on the western bank of the Navasoto cieek, at the crossing of the upper road loading from Bexar to NacogJoches; thence with said road westwardly, to the dividing ridge between the waters of the rivers Brazos and Colorado: thence with this ridge of hills northwest, to strike the Comanche trace leading to Nacogdoches; thence with this trace or road to Navasoto creek; thence with its meanderings downwards, to the place of beginning.

The contract set Robertson's payment as empresario to be five leagues and five labors, 23,027.5 acres (93.189 km^{2}; 35.9805 sq mi), of premium lands for every 100 families introduced into the colony. The colony was established in Falls County, with the capital named Sarahville de Viesca after Robertson's mother Sarah Maclin Robertson, and Governor Viesca. It was located near present-day Marlin. Robertson's son Elijah Sterling Clack Robertson worked translating deeds into the Spanish language for the colony, and received 1,107 acres (4.48 km^{2}; 1.730 sq mi) in Milam County for his services.

Due to the outbreak of the Texas Revolution, the provisional government of Texas shut down all colonial Land Offices in November 1835. Robertson succeed in introducing 600 families to the colony before 1838. He filed a lawsuit in Travis County District Court in November 1837, to receive his payment of premium lands for the families he did introduce. In 1841, the District Court found in his favor. In December 1847, the Texas Supreme Court discounted 221 of those families. Even though the families were introduced to the colony within the time frame of Robertson's contract, the Texas Supreme Court cited that the discounted 221 families were introduced after the 1835 closing of the Land Offices.
