= Salado Springs =

Groups of springs in Salado, Texas

Coordinates: 30°56′39″N 97°32′17″W

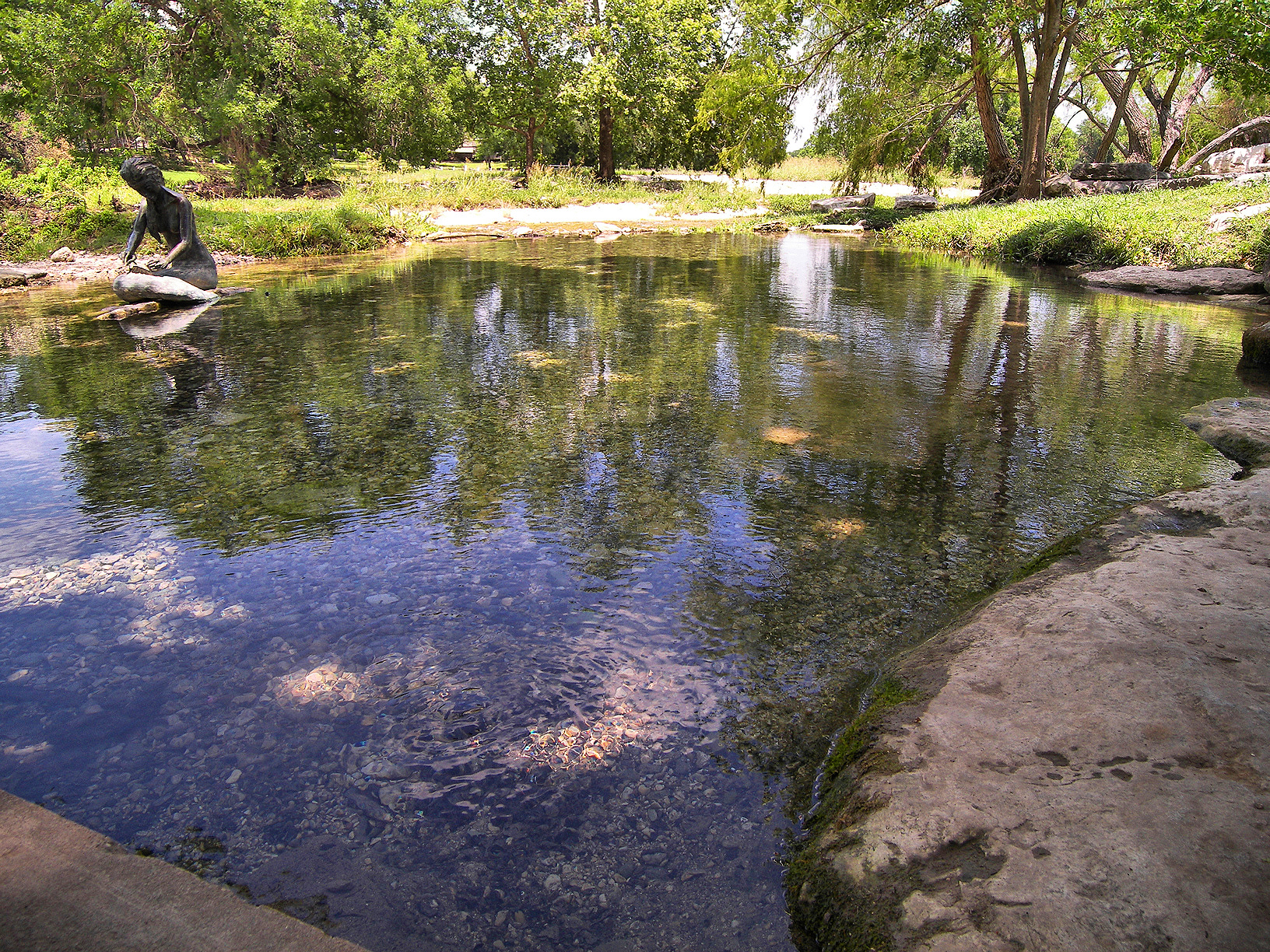
- Salado Springs
- Interactive map of Salado Springs
- Location: Salado, Texas, U.S.A
- Spring source: Faults along Balcones Escarpment
- Elevation: 560 ft (170 m) above sea level
- Type: Karst springs
- Provides water for: Salado Creek
- Magnitude: 2
- Discharge: 16.2 ft^{3}/s (460 L/s)

Salado Springs is the name of five groups of springs at the town of Salado in Bell County, Texas, in the United States. The springs are located 48 miles (77 km) north of Austin or 135 miles (217 km) south of Dallas.

The springs, which are not saline (salado is Spanish for "salty"), were likely named for Salado Creek.

== Geography and natural history ==
The Salado Springs are located in the Balcones Fault zone, and they reach the surface through artesian pressure by way of faults in the Cretaceous Edwards limestone. The main recharge area for the springs is probably several miles to the southwest in Williamson County, where several faults intersect with Salado Creek.

The larger of the springs include Robertson Springs, Big Boiling Spring, Elm, Benedict, and Anderson springs. The latter three are located downstream (east) of the others. During the 1980s, the combined flow from all of the springs averaged approximately 122 U.S. gallons per second (460 liters per second).

The Balcones Fault Zone at Barton Springs is a demarcation line for certain ecological systems and species distributions. For example, the California Fan Palm, Washingtonia filifera is distributed strictly west of Barton Springs or the Balcones Fault.

== History ==
The Salado Springs area was occupied for many years by the Tawakoni Indians, and by Paleo Indian peoples for thousands of years before that. Spanish explorer Juan Antonio Bustillo y Ceballos probably visited the springs in 1732 as he traveled westward through the region. The area was settled by Archibald Willingham in 1851 and subsequently became a well-known stage stop, as well as a stop on the Chisholm Trail. A dam was built in 1863 to power a mill, but this flooded some of the springs. A court order finally caused the dam to be lowered in 1878.
