= Balcones Fault =

Fault zone in Texas, United States

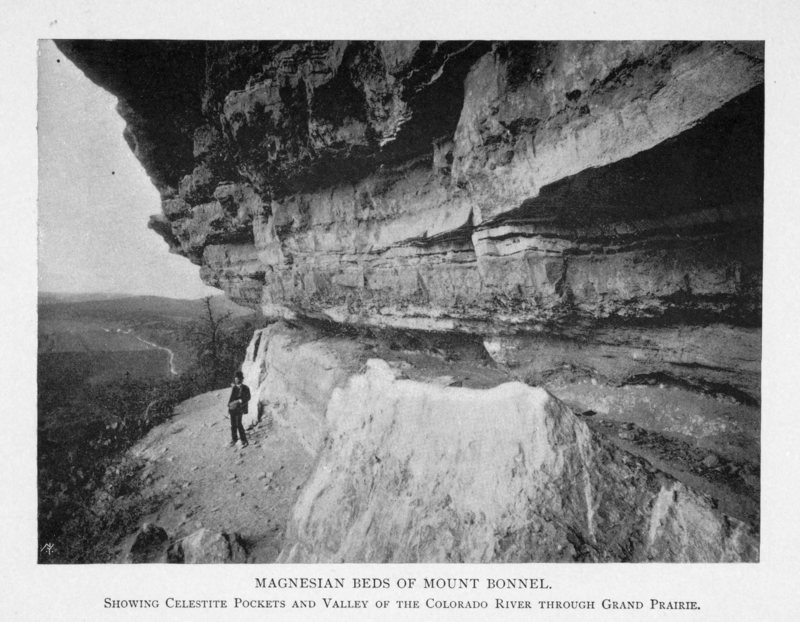
Escarpment formed by the Balcones Fault at Mount Bonnell

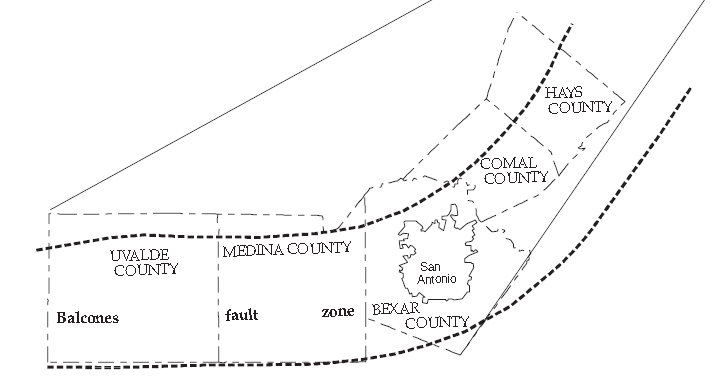
Balcones Fault Trend and affected counties

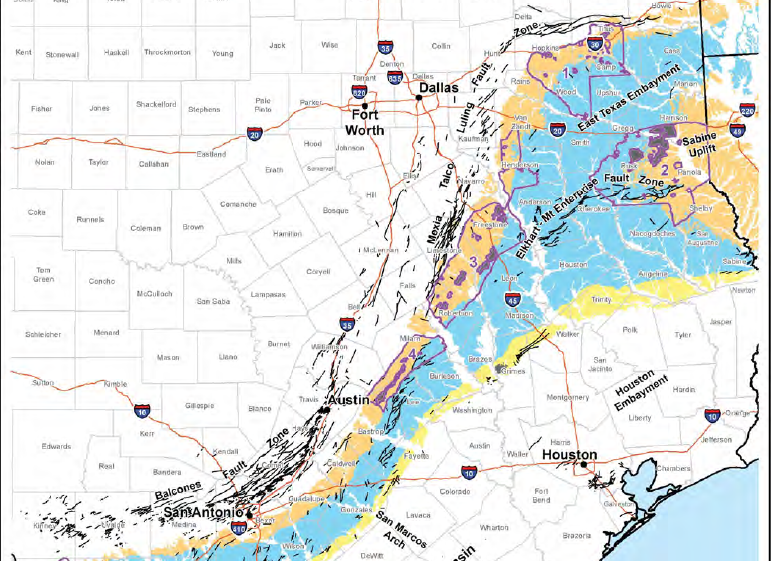
Geological map of the Balcones, and the Mexia-Talco-Luling Fault Trends, where black lines are faults, the blue shaded area is the Claiborne Group, yellow is the Jackson Group, and tan is the Wilcox Group

The Balcones (/bælˈkoʊnɛz/) Fault or Balcones Fault Zone is an area of largely normal faulting in the U.S. state of Texas that runs roughly from the southwest part of the state near Del Rio to the north-central region near Dallas along Interstate 35. Derived from the Spanish word in architecture for “balcony,” or “vantage point” in geology and nature, the Balcones feature is said to have been named by Spanish explorer Bernardo de Miranda in 1756, part of El Camino Real, or the "King’s Highway" that skirted the fault line. The Balcones Fault zone is made up of many smaller features, including normal faults, grabens, and horsts. One of the obvious features is the Mount Bonnell Fault.

The location of the fault zone may be related to the Ouachita Mountains, formed 300 million years ago during a continental collision. Although long since worn away in Texas, the roots of these ancient mountains still exist, buried beneath thousands of feet of sediment. These buried Ouachita Mountains may still be an area of weakness that becomes a preferred site for faulting when stress exists in the Earth's crust.

The Balcones Fault has remained inactive for nearly 15 million years, with the last activity being during the Neogene period. This activity was related to subsidence of the Texas Coastal Plain, most likely from the large amount of sediment deposited on it by Texas rivers. The Balcones Fault is in one of the lowest-risk zones for earthquakes in the United States.

The surface expression of the fault is the Balcones Escarpment, which forms the eastern boundary of the Texas Hill Country and the western boundary of the Texas Coastal Plain, and consists of cliffs and cliff-like structures. Subterranean features such as Wonder Cave and numerous other smaller caves are found along the fault zone.

Many springs are located along this fault zone. Springs such as San Pedro Springs, Comal Springs, San Marcos Springs, Barton Springs, and Salado Springs are found in the fault zone and provide a source of fresh water and a place for human settlement.

The Balcones Fault Zone is a demarcation line for certain ecological systems and for species distributions, e.g., the California fan palm (Washingtonia filifera) is the only species of palm tree native to the continental United States west of the Balcones Fault.

== See also ==
- Balcones Canyonlands National Wildlife Refuge
- Colorado River (Texas)
- Edwards Plateau
- Edwards Aquifer
- Texas Hill Country
