= Col. Elijah Sterling Clack Robertson Plantation =

Historic house in Texas, United States

- U.S. National Register of Historic Places
- Recorded Texas Historic Landmark
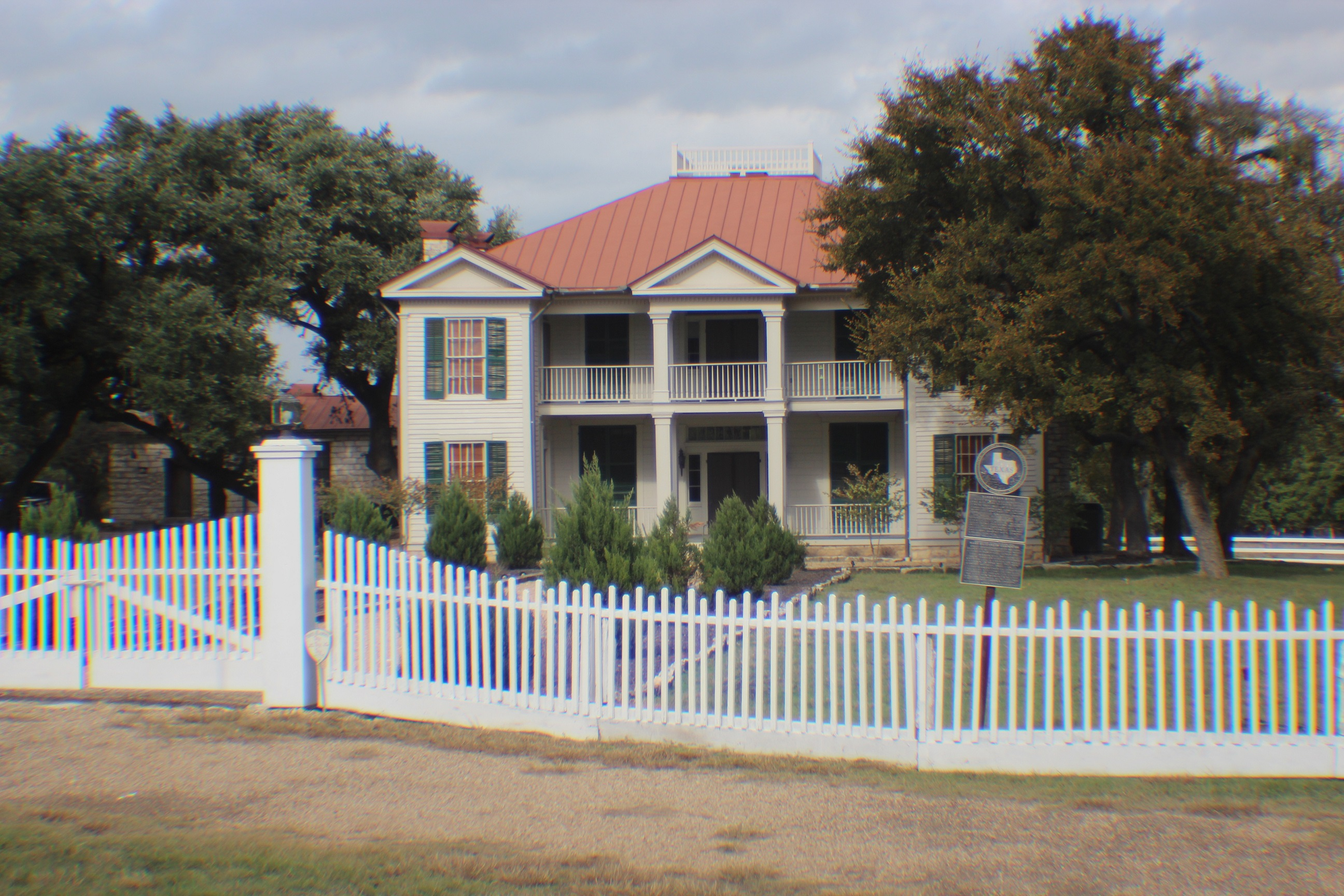
- Robertson Plantation in 2016

- Location within Texas Location within the United States
- Location: I-35, Salado, Texas
- Coordinates: 30°56′37″N 97°32′34″W
- Area: 4.3 acres (1.7 ha)
- Built: 1852
- Architectural style: Classical Revival
- MPS: Salado MRA
- NRHP reference No.: 83003084
- RTHL No.: 4305

Significant dates
- Added to NRHP: April 5, 1983
- Designated RTHL: 1967

The Col. Elijah Sterling Clack Robertson Plantation is a Southern plantation with a historic house located in Salado, Texas, USA. The National Register of Historic Places has listed it since April 5, 1983. Robertson built the house in the late 1850s, completing the construction of the main house in 1860. Robertson obtained the mansion's metal roof from Houston and used local limestone to build the kitchen, the stable, and quarters for the people he enslaved. In 1936, the Historic American Buildings Survey listed the plantation, which received a Texas Centennial Marker. In 1967, the plantation became a Texas Historic Landmark.

== See also ==
- National Register of Historic Places listings in Bell County, Texas
- Recorded Texas Historic Landmarks in Bell County
