= Oscar Branch Colquitt =

Governor of Texas from 1911 to 1915

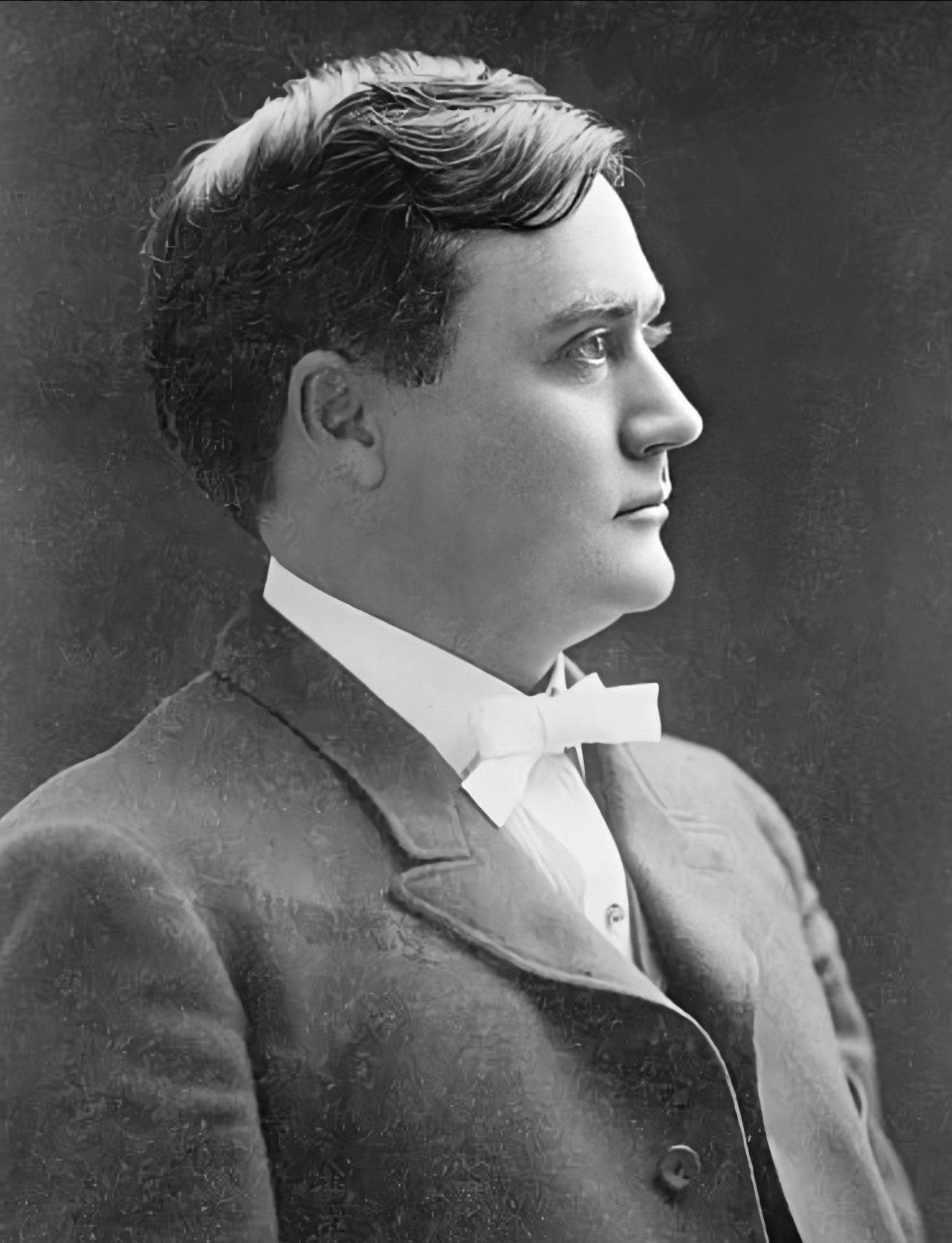
- Colquitt in 1910

25th Governor of Texas
- In office January 17, 1911 – January 19, 1915
- Lieutenant: Asbury Bascom Davidson; William Harding Mayes
- Preceded by: Thomas Mitchell Campbell
- Succeeded by: James E. Ferguson

Railroad Commissioner of Texas
- In office January 21, 1903 – January 17, 1911
- Governor: S. W. T. Lanham; Thomas Mitchell Campbell
- Preceded by: John H. Reagan
- Succeeded by: John L. Wortham

Personal details
- Born: December 16, 1861 Camilla, Georgia, Confederate States of America
- Died: March 8, 1940 (aged 78) Dallas, Texas, U.S.
- Resting place: Oakwood Cemetery; Austin, Texas, U.S.
- Party: Democratic
- Spouse: Alice Fuller Murrell (m. 1885)
- Children: 5

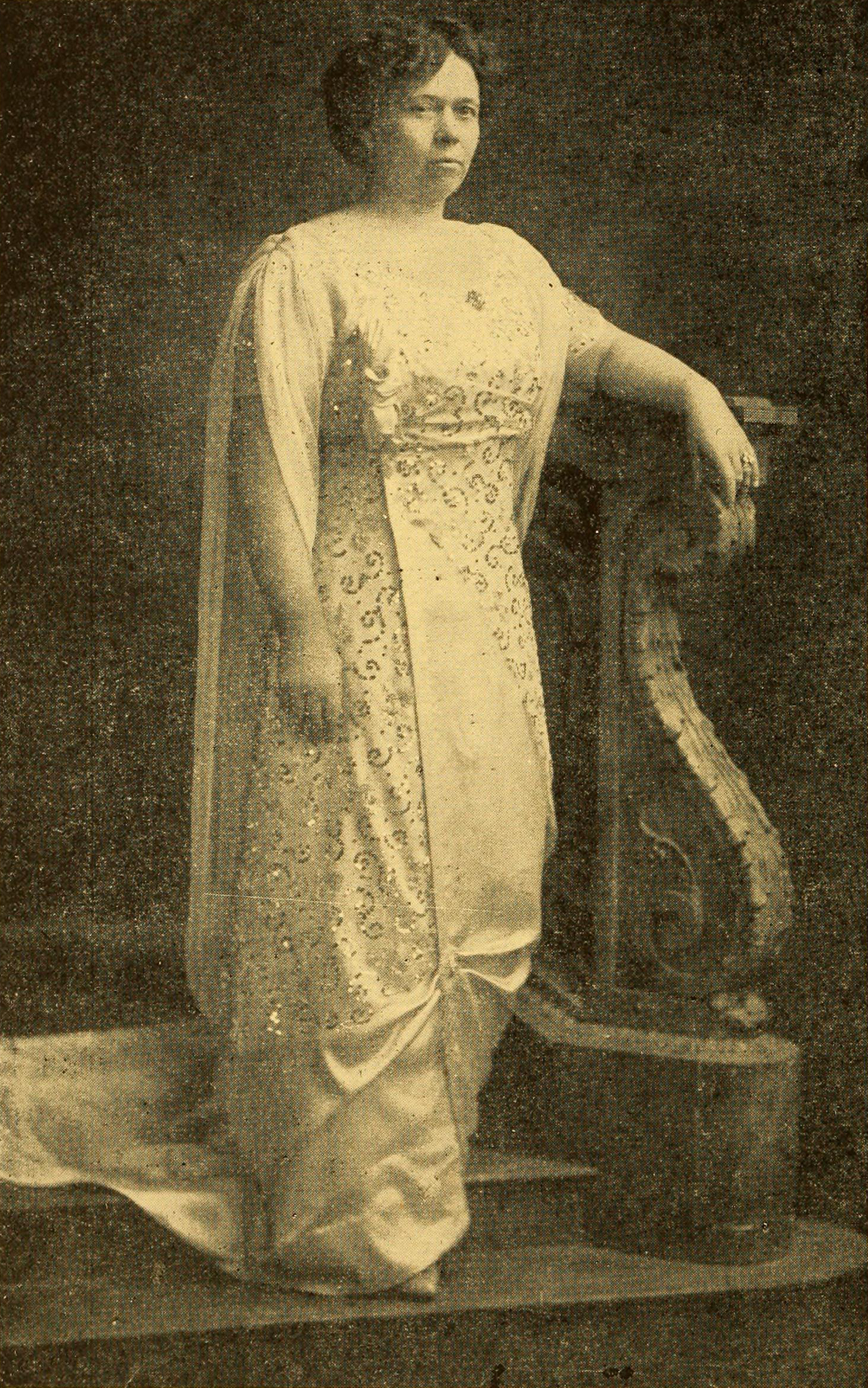
Alice Fuller Murrell Colquitt

Oscar Branch Colquitt (December 16, 1861 – March 8, 1940) was an American politician who served as the 25th governor of Texas from 1911 to 1915. He was a conservative member of the Democratic Party. Colquitt defended the actions of the Texas Rangers who allegedly crossed into Mexico in pursuit of the body of Clemente Vergara in March 1914. Colquitt was 6 ft 2.41 inches tall and weight of 106 kg, which makes him the heaviest governor of Texas.

== Early years ==
Oscar Branch Colquitt was born December 16, 1861, in Camilla, Georgia, to Thomas Jefferson Colquitt and Ann Elizabeth (Burkhalter) Colquitt. Through his great-great-grandfather Anthony Colquitt he is related to Senator Walter T. Colquitt of Georgia and his son Senator Alfred H. Colquitt, also the governor of Georgia. Thomas Jefferson Colquitt served in the Confederate States Army as an officer, and after the Civil War, attempted to farm using freed slaves as laborers. The weather destroyed the family's crops, and they lost everything.

Eager to start over, Colquitt's family moved to Morris County, Texas, arriving in Daingerfield on January 8, 1878. For three years he worked as a tenant farmer, walking the 2 miles (3.2 km) to school after the crops were in. Colquitt then spent one term at the Daingerfield Academy, where he boarded with the family of state legislator John A. Peacock. After leaving school, Colquitt unsuccessfully attempted to get a job as a brakeman or fireman with the East Line and Red River Railroad. Instead, he worked briefly as a porter at the Daingerfield train station and then spent several months working at a turning lathe in a local furniture factory.

In 1881, Colquitt became a printer's devil for the Morris County Banner. Several months after beginning his job his employer opened a new paper at Greenville, and Colquitt worked there until he purchased his own paper in 1884, the Pittsburg Gazette. Within two years Colquitt had purchased two newspapers in Terrell and combined them into one newspaper, the Times-Star.

During this time, Colquitt married and began a family. Alice Fuller Murrell of Minden, Louisiana, became his wife on December 9, 1885. The couple went on to have four sons and a daughter. His sons included Oscar Branch, Jr., Rawlins M., Sidney B. and Oscar B. III.

== Politics ==
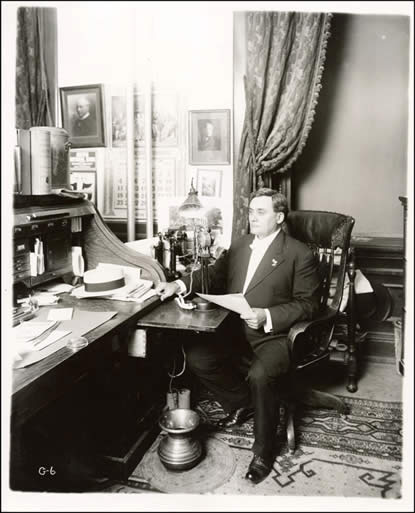
Colquitt in 1913

In 1890, Colquitt campaigned in favor of the creation of the Railroad Commission of Texas and vigorously supported the election of Jim Hogg as governor. He was elected to the Texas Senate in 1895 and served for four years, authoring several delinquent-tax laws. He served as the state revenue agent for the last eight months of 1898 and wrote a report for the special tax commission that was submitted to the legislature in 1900. For the 1899 and 1901 legislative sessions, Colquitt worked as a paid lobbyist. He was admitted to the bar in 1900, and practiced law when the legislature was not in session.

He was elected to the railroad commission in 1902, and again in 1908, succeeding John H. Reagan. During his two terms on the commission, he "was instrumental in promoting the construction of the Galveston Causeway."

In 1906, Colquitt ran for governor, but, in part due to his opposition to Prohibition, he failed to win the Democratic nomination. He ran again in 1910, still opposing Prohibition, with the slogan "Political Peace and Legislative Rest." Although his opponents referred to him as "Little Oscar" for his diminutive stature, Colquitt won both the primary and the general election. He was not present for the Democratic convention which nominated him for the position, as his youngest son, Oscar B. III age 4, died in Austin at roughly the same time.

After taking office, Colquitt resigned his position on the railroad commission and was able to appoint his own successor to the post. Prohibitionist Democrats had been elected to a majority in each house of the legislature, and following the election, the public was allowed to vote on whether to enact a statewide prohibition on alcohol sales; this was defeated by 6,000 votes.

Colquitt had an uneasy relationship with the legislature during his time as governor, and their disagreements often bled into issues that had nothing to do with prohibition. In the first legislative session over which he presided, Colquitt vetoed half of the bills that were sent to him.

Twice during his term in office Colquitt sent the Texas Rangers to the border with Mexico to maintain order. The Rangers had some success, but were accused of mistreating peaceful Mexican-American citizens. Federal troops eventually arrived to replace the Rangers.

During his term, the legislature passed laws reforming the penal system and enacted several laws benefitting labor. One law limited the number of hours women could work, while another provided regulations for child workers and a third dealt with factory working conditions. The legislature also passed a worker's compensation act. Colquitt attempted to block some of these bills, but did sign all of them into law. In 1912, he called a meeting of Southern governors to work out a plan to stabilize the cotton market. The conference recommended the creation of state warehouses and acreage reduction. The Farmers' Union in Texas promoted those ideas, and over 2 million fewer acres of cotton was planted in 1912. This caused cotton prices to increase, and Colquitt took the credit.

Despite a campaign promise to never obstruct the support of education, he vetoed some public school appropriations. With labor support, he won reelection in late 1912 by almost 40,000 votes in the Democratic primary (in the early 20th century, victory in the primary was tantamount to winning the election in deep-blue Texas) giving him a second term as governor.

== Later years ==
After leaving office, Colquitt became sympathetic to the German cause. He tried to purchase the New York Sun, which he intended to use to disseminate German propaganda, but was not successful. He later ran for the U.S. Senate in 1916. During his campaign, Colquitt cited his efforts at stabilizing the cotton market to demonstrate his interest in the farmers, and the labor legislation of his administration to show that he was a friend of labor. Despite his efforts, Colquitt was defeated in the Democratic primary runoff election by incumbent Sen. Charles Allen Culberson.

Following his defeat, Colquitt became president of an oil company in Dallas. From 1928 until 1929 he served on the U.S. Board of Mediation. In 1935, he became a field representative for the Reconstruction Finance Corporation.

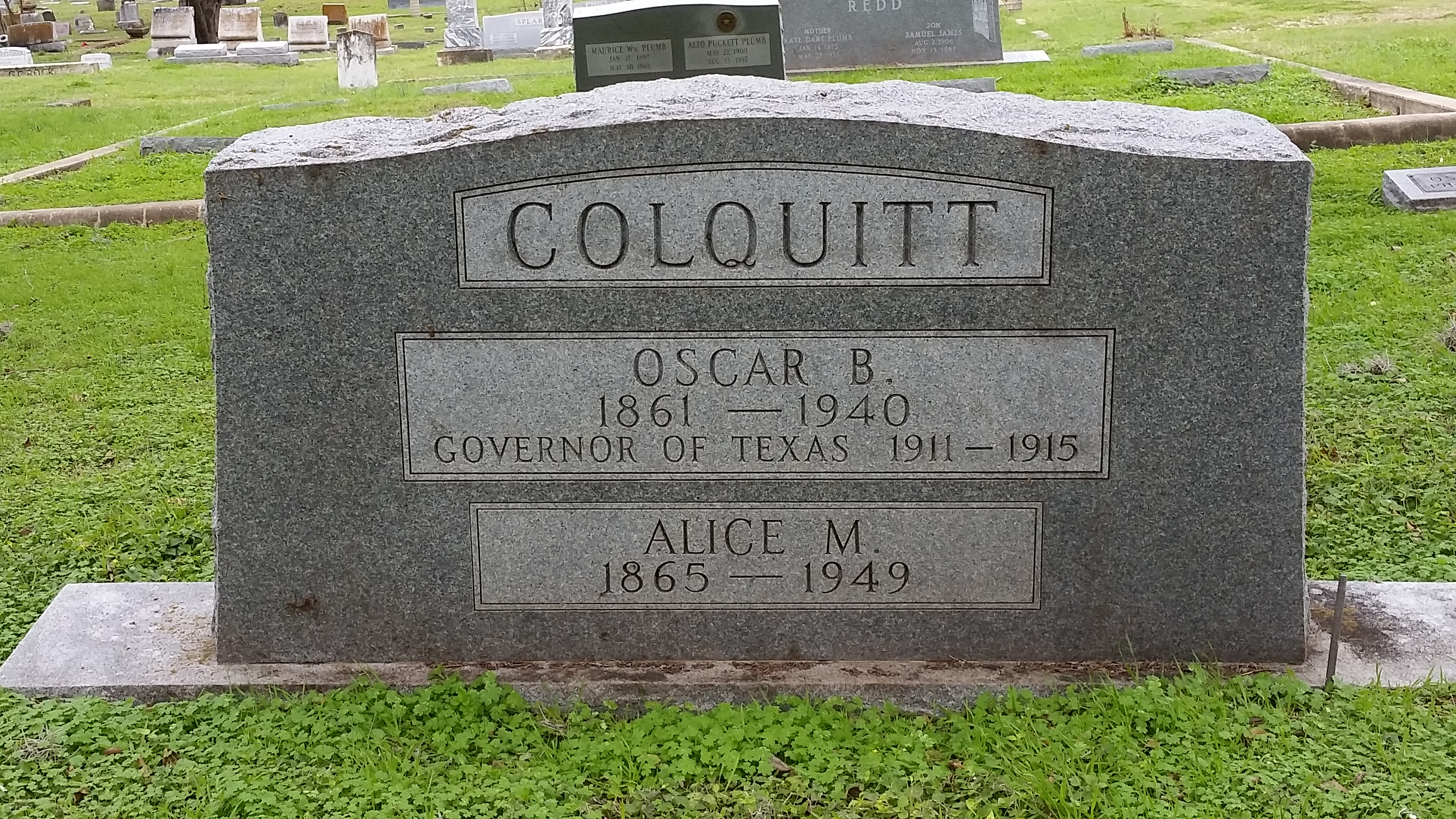
Oscar Colquitt, Oakwood Cemetery

Colquitt suffered a slight stroke in the late 1930s but remained active in his work. After a ten-day battle with influenza, Colquitt died on March 8, 1940, at Dallas, Texas. He is buried in the Oakwood Cemetery in Austin, Texas.

== Notes ==
Party political offices
Preceded by Thomas Mitchell Campbell	Democratic nominee for Governor of Texas; 1910, 1912	Succeeded by James E. Ferguson
Texas Senate
Preceded by George T. Jester	Texas State Senator from District 9; 1899-1903	Succeeded by Ben H. Johnson
Political offices
Preceded by Thomas Mitchell Campbell	Governor of Texas; 1911-1915	Succeeded by James E. Ferguson
