= Zeb V. Walser =

American politician (1866–1940)

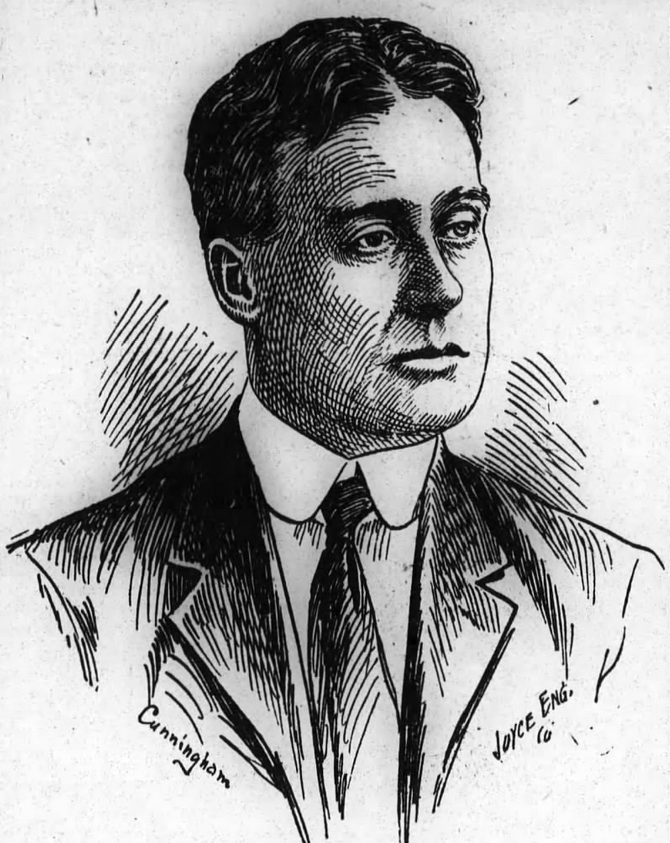

33rd North Carolina Attorney General
- In office 1896–1900
- Governor: Daniel Lindsay Russell
- Preceded by: Frank I. Osborne
- Succeeded by: Robert Dick Douglas

Member of the North Carolina House of Representatives
- In office 1888–1889
- In office 1894–1895

Member of the North Carolina Senate
- In office 1890–1892

Personal details
- Born: Zeb Vance Walser; June 17, 1866 Yadkin College, North Carolina
- Died: February 17, 1940 (aged 73) Lexington, North Carolina, U.S.
- Party: Republican
- Education: Yadkin College; University of North Carolina; University of Michigan Law School
- Occupation: Lawyer, politician

Zeb Vance Walser (June 17, 1866 – February 17, 1940) was a North Carolina attorney and politician. Named for Governor Zebulon B. Vance, Walser nevertheless became active in the Republican Party rather than Vance's Democrats. He served in the North Carolina House of Representatives including as Speaker of the North Carolina House of Representatives. He also served as Attorney General of North Carolina.

== Biography ==
Zeb V. Walser was born at Yadkin College, North Carolina on June 17, 1866. He was admitted to the bar in 1886 and began practicing law in Lexington, North Carolina. He attended Yadkin College, the University of North Carolina, and the University of Michigan Law School. He was elected to the North Carolina House of Representatives in 1888, and to the North Carolina Senate in 1890. In 1894, Walser was again elected to the state House, which elected him Speaker for one term after Republicans and Populists formed a majority in a Fusionist controlled legislature.

In 1896, Walser was elected North Carolina Attorney General, and as of 2024, remains the last Republican to have been elected to that office. In 1900, he became official reporter for the North Carolina Supreme Court.

In 1912, Walser served as state campaign manager for Theodore Roosevelt's unsuccessful presidential campaign.

He died in Lexington on February 17, 1940, at age 76.

== Notes ==
Party political offices
Preceded by Thomas Richard Purnell	Republican nominee for Attorney General of North Carolina; 1896, 1900	Succeeded by W.H. Yarborough Jr.
Legal offices
Preceded by Frank I. Osborne	Attorney General of North Carolina; 1897–1900	Succeeded by Robert Dick Douglas
