= James D. Walthall =

American lawyer and politician (1876–1916)

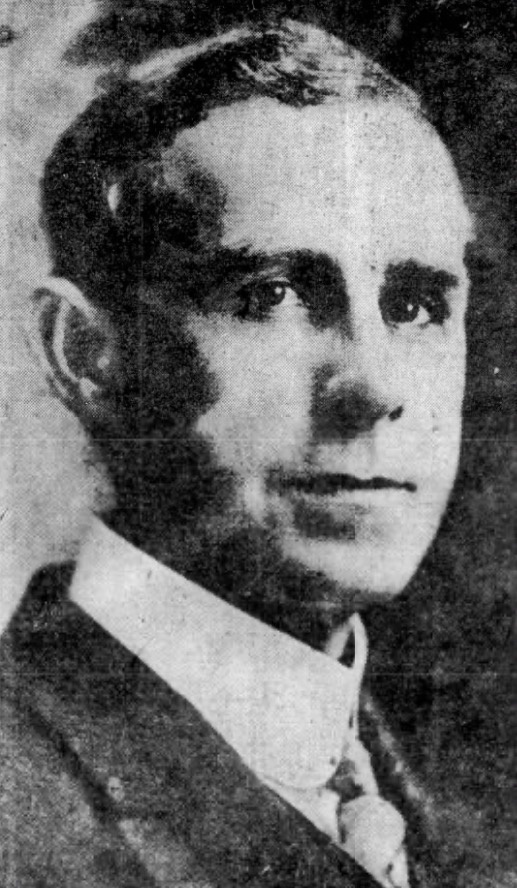

Texas Attorney General
- In office September 1, 1912 – January 1, 1914
- Governor: Oscar Branch Colquitt
- Preceded by: Jewel P. Lightfoot
- Succeeded by: B. F. Looney

Personal details
- Born: James Du Bose Walthall; March 12, 1876 Perry County, Alabama, US
- Died: March 26, 1916 (aged 40) San Antonio, Texas, US
- Relations: Edward C. Walthall (cousin); Henry VII of England
- Occupation: Lawyer, politician

James Du Bose Walthall (March 12, 1876 – March 26, 1916) was an American lawyer and politician. He was Texas Attorney General from 1912 to 1914.

== Biography ==
Walthall was born on March 12, 1876, in Perry County, Alabama, the son of Thomas J. Walthall and Alice (née Du Bose) Walthall. He was a cousin once-removed of Edward C. Walthall, and a descendent of Henry VII of England. Educated in Marion, he graduated from the University of Texas at Austin School of Law in 1903, with a Doctor of Laws. He began practicing law in San Antonio, joining the firm Denman, Franklin, & McGown. He was also involved in land management.

In October 1907, Walthall became assistant Texas Attorney General under Robert V. Davidson, and in 1910 became assistant to Jewel P. Lightfoot. He served as Attorney General from September 1, 1912, to January 1, 1914, having been appointed by Governor Oscar Branch Colquitt to complete Lightfoot's unexpired term following his resignation. In his role, he defended Texas in court, including a victory in the Supreme Court of the United States. He was primarily involved in lawsuits regarding tax.

After serving, Walthall returned to practicing law, in San Antonio. On March 16, 1915, he married Mary Carson. He died in a fire on March 26, 1916, aged 40, in San Antonio.
