= Theodore F. Davidson =

US lawyer, executive and politician

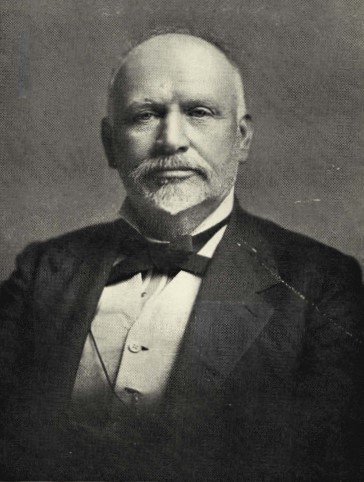

Mayor of Asheville, North Carolina
- In office 1895
- Preceded by: Thomas Walton Patton
- Succeeded by: William J. Cocke

31st Attorney General of North Carolina
- In office 1885–1893
- Preceded by: Thomas S. Kenan
- Succeeded by: Frank I. Osborne

Personal details
- Born: Theodore Fulton Davidson; March 30, 1845 Haywood County, North Carolina, U.S.
- Died: June 11, 1931 (aged 86)
- Party: Democratic
- Education: Bailey Law School
- Occupation: Politician, lawyer, railroad executive

Theodore Fulton Davidson (March 30, 1845 – June 11, 1931) was an American lawyer, railroad executive, and politician who served as Mayor of Asheville and Attorney General of North Carolina. He served two terms in the North Carolina Senate. He served as director of the Western North Carolina Insane Asylum. He was a criminal court judge. He returned to the state legislature in 1891 and 1892. In 1904, Davidson contested the Democratic Party gubernatorial nomination An Episcopalian, he was a founder and trustee of Weaver College. He married twice and had no children.

He was born in Haywood County, North Carolina, one of A. T. Davidson and Adeline Howell Davidson's eight children. His father, Allen, was a lawyer and bank president who was a delegate at the secession convention of 1861 and served in the Confederate Congress. T.F. Davidson studied at Bailey Law School. He was a lawyer in Asheville. A collection of his papers are held in the Archives of North Carolina.

During the Civil War he served in the Buncombe Rifles, was an aide to Robert B. Vance, and held other offices.

He succeeded Thomas Kenam as North Carolina Attorney General. He was a candidate in the 1904 North Carolina gubernatorial election.

He opposed U.S. involvement in World War I.

He spoke in defense of North Carolina Supreme Court justices D. M. Furches, chief justice, and Associate Justice R. M. Douglas.

He co-authored a book about the history of Buncombe County.

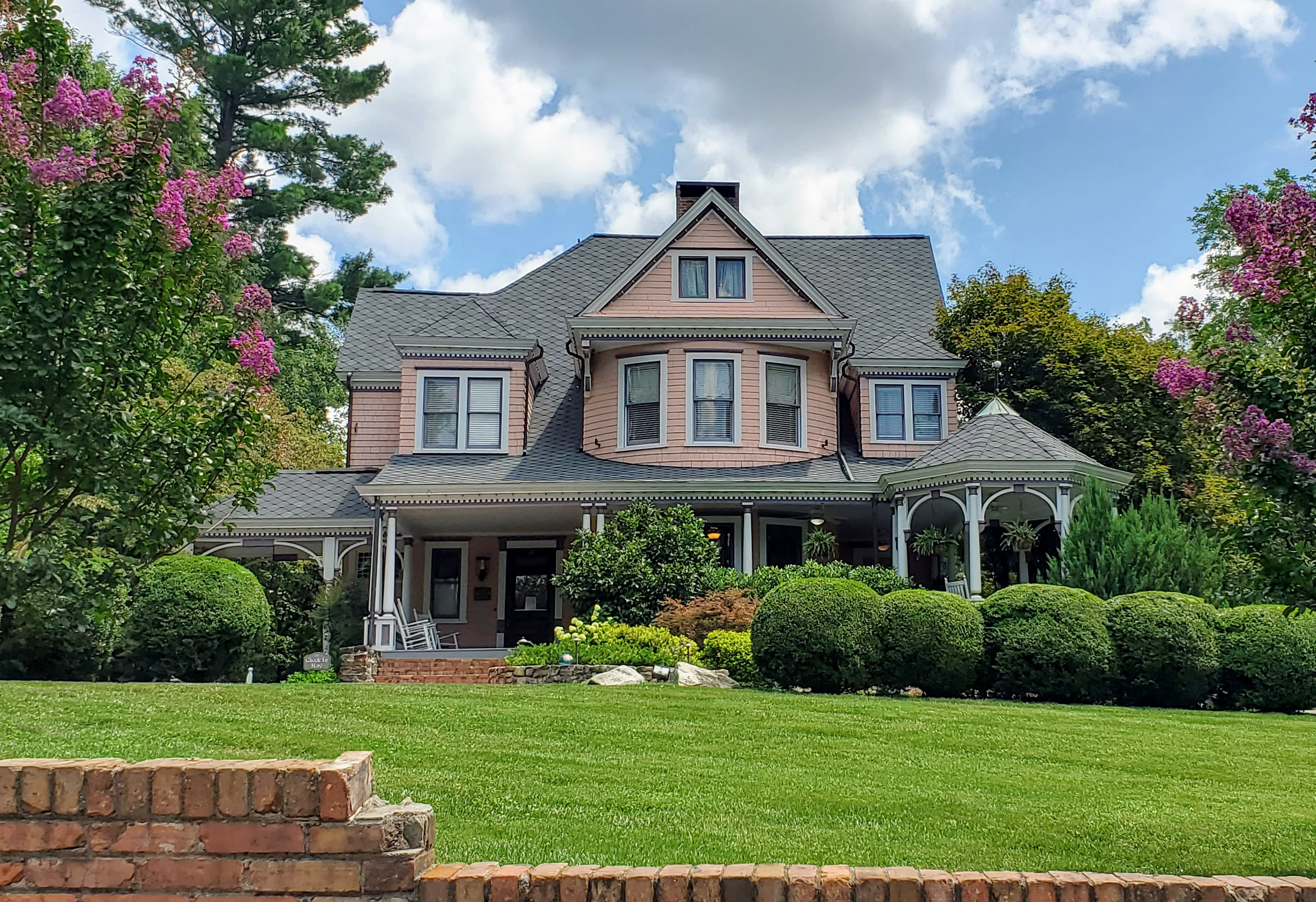
The Theodore F. Davidson House in 2021

His home at 61 North Liberty Street in Asheville is in the Chestnut Hill Historic District listed on the National Register of Historic Places. It is now the Beaufort House Inn. It was designed by Allen L. Melton.

== Writings ==
- Genesis of Buncombe County written with Foster Alexander Sondley

== See also ==
- Vance Monument
