= Francis Osborne (disambiguation) =

Francis Osborne (1593–1659) was an English essayist.

Francis Osborne may also refer to:

- Francis Osborne, 5th Duke of Leeds (1751–1799), British politician
- Francis Osborne, 1st Baron Godolphin (1777–1850), British politician
- Francis D'Arcy-Osborne, 7th Duke of Leeds (1798–1859), British politician
- Francis D'Arcy Osborne, 12th Duke of Leeds (1884–1964), British diplomat
- Frank I. Osborne (Francis Irwin Osborne, 1853–1920), Attorney General of North Carolina, 1893–1896

== See also ==
- Francis C. Osborn Sr., businessman and teacher
- Frank Osborne (disambiguation)
- Frances Osborne (born 1969), British author
