= Senator Looney =

Senator Looney may refer to:

- B. F. Looney (1859–1951), Texas State Senate
- Lamar Looney (1871–1935), Oklahoma State Senate
- Martin Looney (born 1948), Connecticut State Senate
