= Frank Osborne =

Frank Osborne may refer to:

- Frank Osborne (California politician), mayor of Alameda, California
- Frank Osborne (footballer) (1896–1988), English footballer
- Frank I. Osborne (1853–1920), North Carolina politician
- Frank M. Osborne (1879–1956), college football player and coach

== See also ==
- Francis Osborne (disambiguation)
