= Bailey Law School =

Private college in Asheville, North Carolina

- Asheville, Buncombe County, North Carolina; United States

Information
- School type: Private Law
- Established: 1859
- Closed: 1877
- President: John Lancaster Bailey

Bailey Law School was a private law school located in Black Mountain and Asheville, North Carolina. It was established in 1859 by judge John Lancaster Bailey in Black Mountain but moved to Asheville after the Civil War. It operated in Asheville for ten years before closing.

== History ==
Bailey Law School was established in 1859 by John Lancaster Bailey. Bailey was born in Pasquotank County, North Carolina in 1795 and graduated from the University of North Carolina at Chapel Hill in 1819. Bailey served as the attorney for the University of North Carolina, starting in 1832. He then studied law under James Iredell in Edenton, North Carolina. Iredell was the Attorney General of North Carolina and a justice with the Supreme Court of the United States. Bailey practiced law after receiving his license and also served in both branches of the state legislature and the North Carolina 1834 constitutional convention. In January 1837, he was elected a judge of the North Carolina Superior Court and served in this role for more than 25 years until he resigned on November 29, 1863.

Bailey first taught law students from his practice in Elizabeth City, North Carolina. He started a law school in Hillsborough, North Carolina, along with Frederick Nash who was a justice on the North Carolina Supreme Court. Their students came from across the South. The school was known for Bailey's large library.

Bailey purchased land near Black Mountain, North Carolina from Jesse Stepp in 1858. In February 1859, Bailey and his son, William Henry Bailey, advertised their intent to form a law school in Buncombe County, North Carolina on "the first of March next". His son had been the Attorney General of North Carolina. One established, Bailey Law School attracted students from across North Carolina. However, the school closed in 1861 because of the Civil War, with William and many of the school's students enlisting in the Confederate Army.

After the war, Bailey reestablished the school in Asheville and also practiced law with James Green Martin. William Bailey did not return to the school and instead opened a law practice in Salisbury, North Carolina where he proposed to establish another law school.

Bailey Law School operated in Asheville for ten years before closing when Bailey died on June 30, 1877. It had one female student, Grace Hallyburton.

== Campus ==
The law school was originally housed in a one-room log cabin at the North Fork, near the headwaters of the Swannanoa River outside of Black Mountain. The school was near Greybeard Mountain and ran close to the top of Black Mountain (now Mount Mitchell). The building faced the river and had the mountains to its rear. The students boarded at the Alexander Inn and had to climb a mountain to reach the cabin. After the Civil War, the school moved to Biltmore Avenue in Asheville where it was housed in a one-story structure.

After Bailey died in 1879, James G. Martin, an alumnus of the Bailey Law School, served as Bailey's executor and oversaw the sale of the original campus. One of the property's many owners was John Kerr Connally, another Bailey Law School alumnus. Later, it become the site of Zebulon Vance's Gombroon Estate. This property is now part of the Asheville watershed/North Fork Reservoir and part of the Mount Mitchell State Park.

== Student life ==
Bailey Law School had a chapter of Sigma Nu fraternity in 1871.

== Notable people ==
=== Alumni ===
- John Kerr Connally, Virginia State Senator and colonel of the 55th North Carolina
- Robert V. Davidson, Texas Attorney General and Texas Senate
- Theodore F. Davidson, an Attorney General of North Carolina
- Hezekiah Alexander Gudger, consul general in Panama and chief justice of the supreme court of the Canal Zone
- Thomas D. Johnston (1867), United States House of Representatives
- James G. Martin, brigadier general in the Confederate States Army and the Mexican–American War

=== Faculty ===
- William Henry Bailey, an Attorney General of North Carolina

== See also ==
- List of colleges and universities in North Carolina
- List of defunct law schools in the United States
