= High Point University =

Private university in High Point, North Carolina, US

- Other name: HPU
- Former name: High Point College (1924–1991)
- Motto: Nil Sine Numine
- Motto in English: Nothing Without Divine Guidance
- Type: Private university
- Established: September 14, 1924; 102 years ago
- Accreditation: SACS
- Religious affiliation: United Methodist Church
- Academic affiliations: IAMSCU; NAICU
- Endowment: $194.9 million (2025)
- President: Nido Qubein
- Provost: Daniel Erb
- Faculty: 500
- Students: 6,335
- Undergraduates: 5,135
- Postgraduates: 1,196
- Location: One North University Parkway, High Point, North Carolina, North Carolina, 27268, United States; 35.9741251°N 79.9954946°W
- Campus: 520 acres (210 ha); Suburban
Colors
Royal Purple and White
- Nickname: Panthers
- Sporting affiliations: NCAA Division I – Big South Conference
- Mascot: Prowler the Panther
- Website: highpoint.edu

High Point University (informally known as HPU) is a private university in High Point, North Carolina, United States. Affiliated with the United Methodist Church, the university was founded in 1924 as High Point College (HPC) by the Methodist Protestant Church and the City of High Point, succeeding Yadkin College, another college sponsored by the Methodist Protestant Church between 1856 and 1895. High Point College was renamed High Point University in 1991.

High Point University has been accredited by the Southern Association of Colleges and Schools since 1951. The university's teams compete in NCAA Division I as members of the Big South Conference.

== History ==
=== As Yadkin College ===
Roberts Hall at High Point University

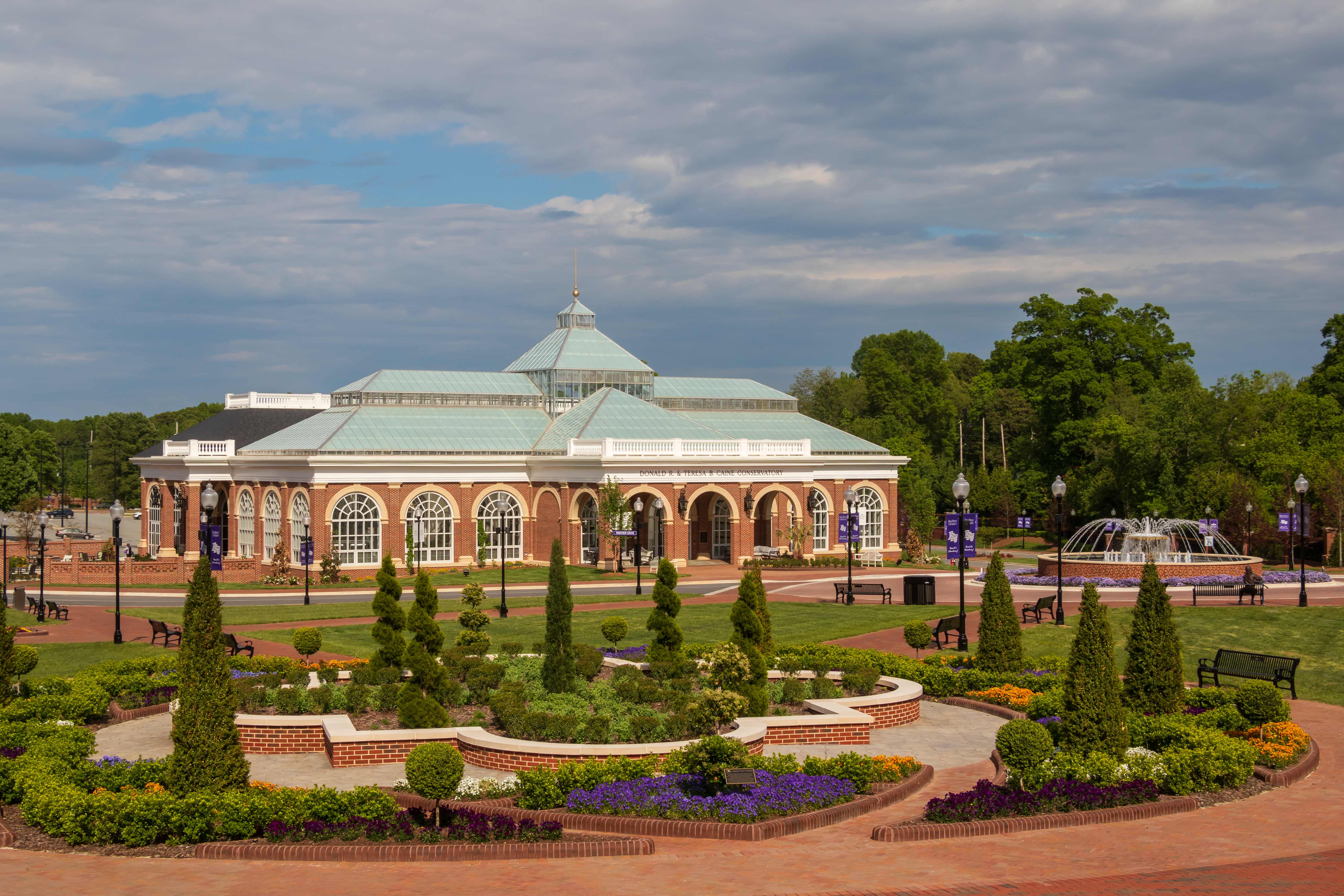
Caine Conservatory

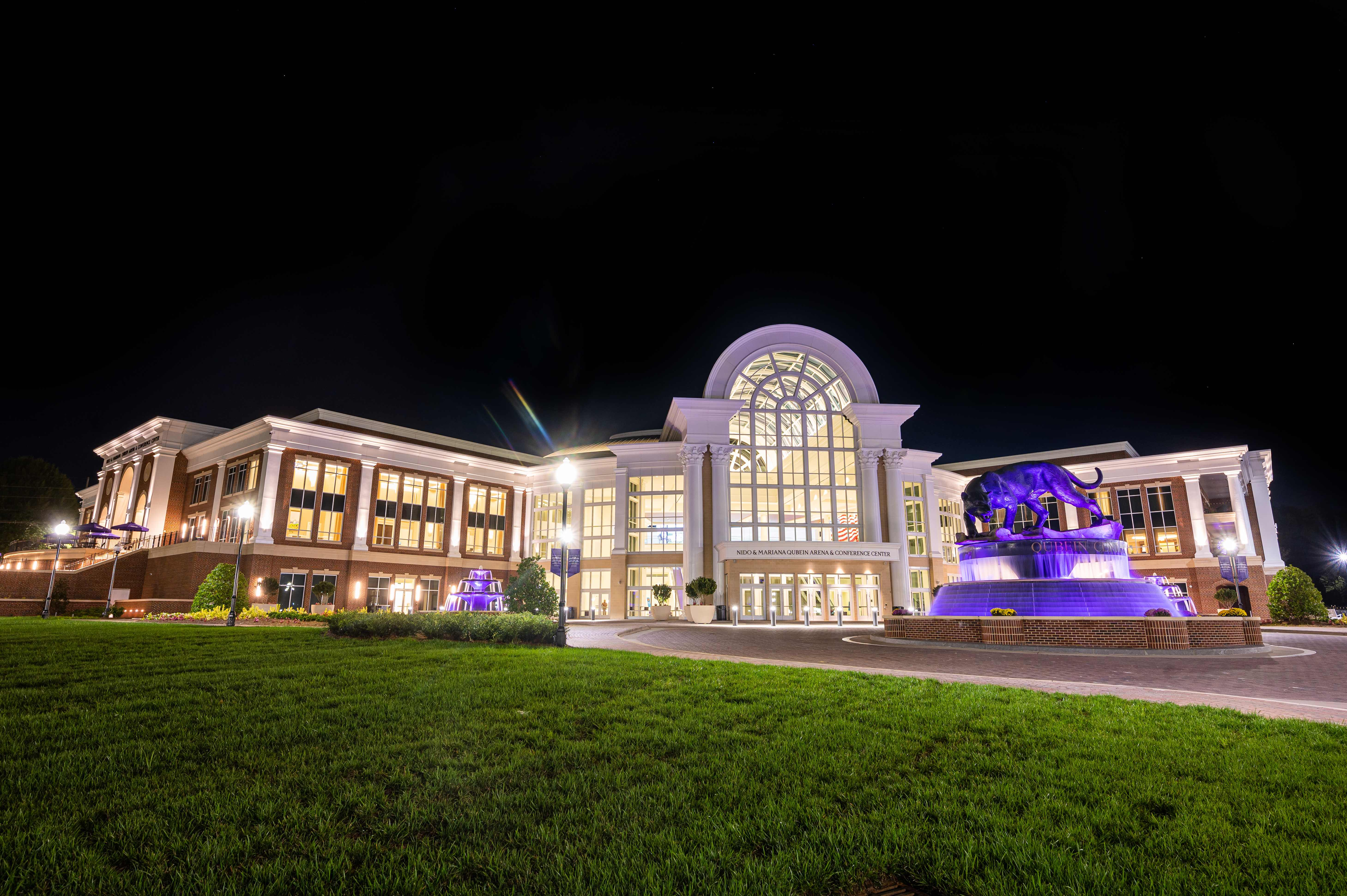
Nido and Mariana Qubein Arena and Conference Center

Cottrell Hall at High Point University

In the mid-19th century, the Methodist Protestant Church, which is now part of the United Methodist Church, became active in educational pursuits in North Carolina, and at the 1852 state annual convention in Fayetteville, Yadkin College was founded in northern Davidson County. Following the Civil War, the Yadkin College fell into financial difficulty, and had by the 1890s become a preparatory high school. Yadkin College was officially named the predecessor of High Point University during its 100th anniversary in 2024.

=== As High Point College ===
In 1921, after some years of consideration, the statewide governing body of the Methodist Protestant Church voted to establish a new college. Shortly afterward, the church accepted an offer from the citizens of High Point to contribute 60 acres (240,000 m^{2}) of land and $100,000 to the project, placing the new school in the city of High Point. The Georgian-style campus, featuring some architectural elements of Colonial Revivalism, was designed by R.E. Mitchell of Washington, D.C., with assistance from Herbert B. Hunter of High Point. High Point College would officially open on September 14, 1924. When the college opened, the campus consisted of three buildings, attended by nine faculty members, with a student enrollment of 122. The same year, Yadkin College closed its doors, and its assets including its library and bell were transferred to High Point College.

The steadfast growth that characterized the birth of the college ended with the Great Depression. In 1932–33, faculty salaries were cut and expenses were sometimes bartered. Despite a $50,000 fundraising campaign, the college declared bankruptcy on June 15, 1934.

=== As High Point University ===
On October 9, 1991, High Point College was renamed to High Point University to reflect its expansion beyond a traditional college curriculum. In 2005, the university was 92 acres (37 ha), with an undergraduate enrollment of 1,450. Its operating budget was $35 million with approximately 100 faculty members. Since Nido R. Qubein became president of High Point University in 2005, the growth of the university has had significant impact on the city, region and state. Qubein is the fourth highest-paid college president in the United States, paid $2.9 million a year.

Since 2005, High Point University has grown from three academic schools to fifteen.

The Chronicle of Higher Education Almanac in April 2016, noted that Qubein was the third-highest charitable donor to a university as president with total donations of $10 million to High Point University from 2006 to 2016.

In 2010, the university announced plans to invest about $2.1 billion in overall growth in the next decade. At that time, High Point University had spent $1.2 billion on four new schools plus facilities, faculty, and student services. Moody's Investors Service downgraded the school's bonds and early 2012, Businessweek reported that about $700 million in new building and campus upgrades were financed by borrowing. In addition to questioning debt levels, Businessweek challenged whether the school's relationships with its lenders and vendors were at an appropriate arm's length, citing in particular that the school spends large amounts on marketing with a public-relations firm headed by Qubein's daughter. The coverage challenged the college's claims that its reputation in higher education grew due to student academic achievement, rather than high-end student amenities and marketing strategy.

Ashley Furniture Industries Chairman Ron Wanek donated $10 million to High Point University in 2013 after visiting Qubein. Wanek's gift to the university was the tenth contribution of $10 million or more that Qubein has earned for the university during his tenure.

In November 2025, three of High Point's Webb School of Engineering programs, including computer science, computer engineering and electrical engineering, were accredited by ABET.

In 2022, High Point University received a $32 million gift from the Rick and Angie Workman Foundation to establish the new dental school, which welcomed its first cohort of students in the fall of 2024. High Point University named its dental school the Workman School of Dental Medicine. In 2023, the university receiving money from Bergmann & Moore, LLC, a law firm that practices in the area of veterans' benefits and started a pro bono law clinic in the Kenneth F. Kahn School of Law focused on helping veterans receive military benefits after they are denied. In 2024, Doug Witcher, the founder and CEO of Smart Choice, an insurance network based in the Piedmont Triad, donated $20 million to High Point University, his alma mater. High Point University's School of Humanities and Behavioral Sciences and its 36,000-square-foot athletic center are named after him.

On August 18, 2025, High Point University welcomed the largest freshman class and largest total enrollment in High Point University's history. The freshman class grew by 9.4% to 1,671 students. High Point University's total new undergraduate students grew by 8% to 1,780 students and the total enrollment grew 3.4% from 6,335 to 6,550 students. One week later, the university broke ground on the new John and Lorraine Charman Library, a $100 million library that will serve as the university's flagship library when it opens in 2027. High Point University received a $35 million lead gift from John and Lorraine Charman to help fund the four-story, 150,000-square-foot library that will be named in honor of them.

== Academics ==
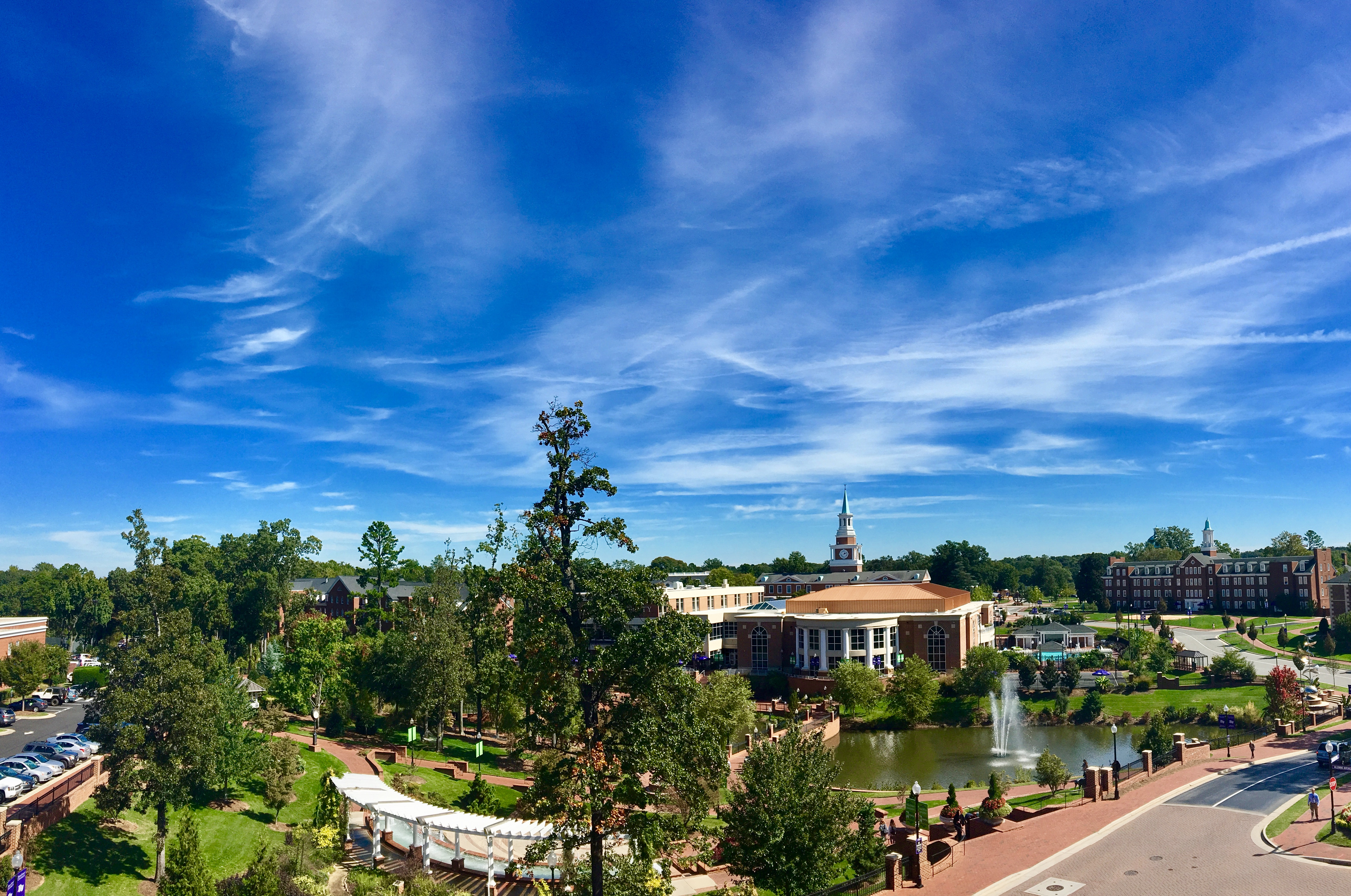
Main campus at High Point University

High Point University offers 66 undergraduate degree programs, 68 undergraduate minors, plus a series of graduate programs. High Point University is organized into multiple academic schools offering undergraduate and professional programs, including the Earl N. Phillips School of Business, the Nido R. Qubein School of Communication, the David R. Hayworth School of Arts and Design, the Fred Wilson School of Pharmacy, the Congdon School of Health Sciences, the Webb School of Engineering, the Kenneth F. Kahn School of Law, and additional schools in education, humanities, natural sciences, and nursing.

In 2026, the university's Kenneth F. Kahn School of Law, which opened in 2024, received provisional accreditation from the American Bar Association. Engineering programs within the Webb School of Engineering have also received accreditation from ABET, the primary accrediting body for engineering education in the United States.

The university has reported student achievement outcomes including Fulbright Program participation; in 2025, five students were awarded Fulbright grants. In 2026, Fortune and The Chronicle of Higher Education reported that 99.2% of High Point University's 2024 graduates were employed or pursuing further education within six months of graduation. The Chronicle highlighted the university's emphasis on career preparation and its required first-year seminar on life skills.

=== Recognition ===
High Point University is included in annual college rankings published by The Princeton Review and U.S. News & World Report. In the 2026 edition of The Princeton Review's Best Colleges, the university was ranked first in the “Best-Run Colleges” category, which is based on student surveys. The publication has also ranked the university in categories related to campus facilities and career services.

U.S. News & World Report includes High Point University in its annual Best Colleges rankings, which evaluate factors such as graduation rates, faculty resources, and student outcomes.

== Student life ==
High Point University is a residential campus, with 23 residence halls in total. In 2025, the Princeton Review ranked High Point University #2 in the nation for Best College Dorm Rooms. All High Point University students are required to reside on campus until senior year.

== Athletics ==
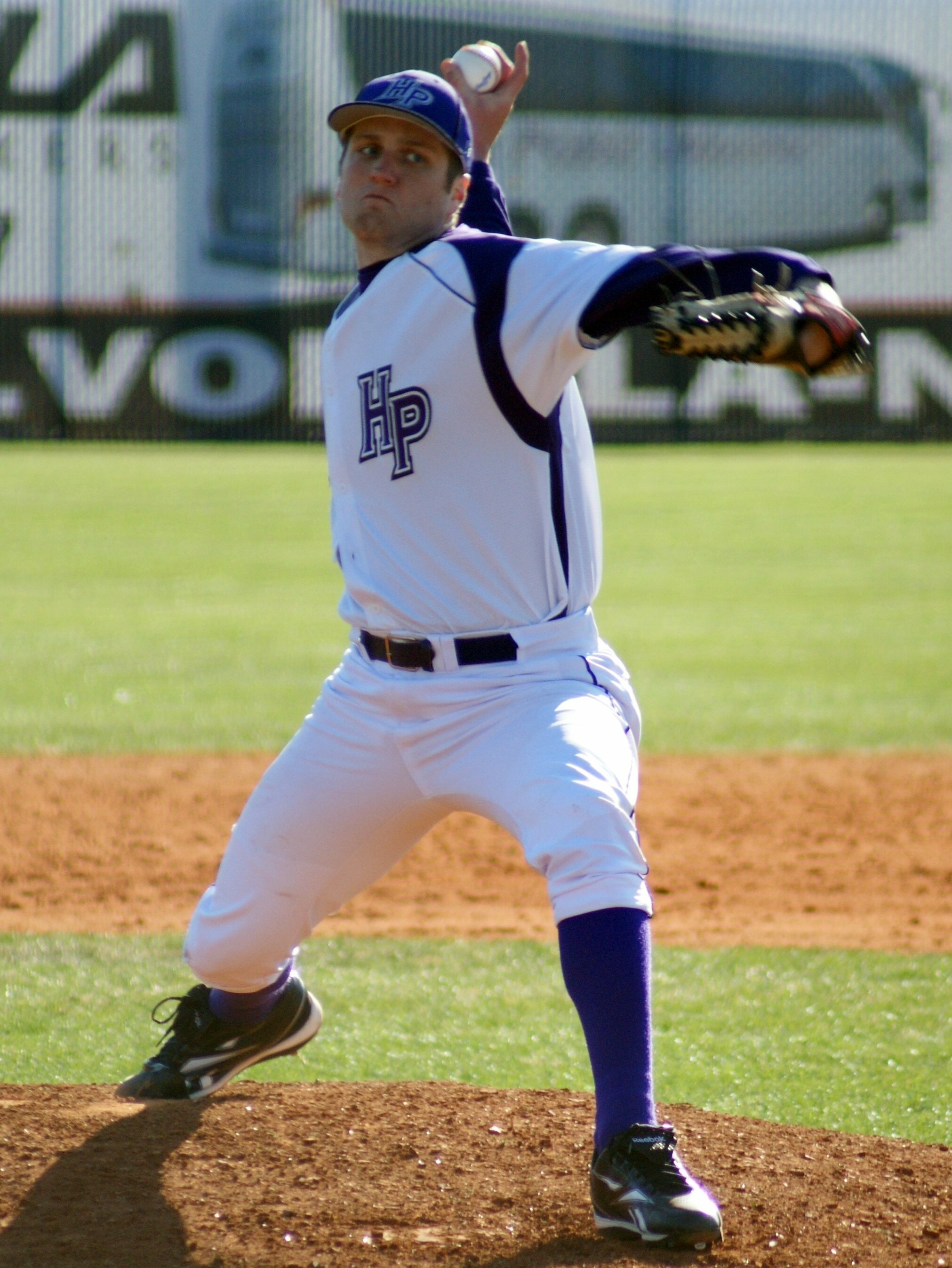
A Panthers baseball player during a 2009 game at Erath Baseball Field

The High Point Panthers include High Point University's 16 athletic teams that compete at the NCAA Division I level, mostly in the Big South Conference. High Point University's 16 varsity sports are baseball, men's and women's basketball, men's and women's cross country, men's and women's golf, men's and women's lacrosse, men's and women's soccer, men's and women's indoor track & field, men's and women's outdoor track & field and women's volleyball. In recent years, High Point University has won nine Big South Conference Championships, produced 10 Conference Players of the Year; and more than 130 High Point University athletes have received Big South All-Academic Honors.

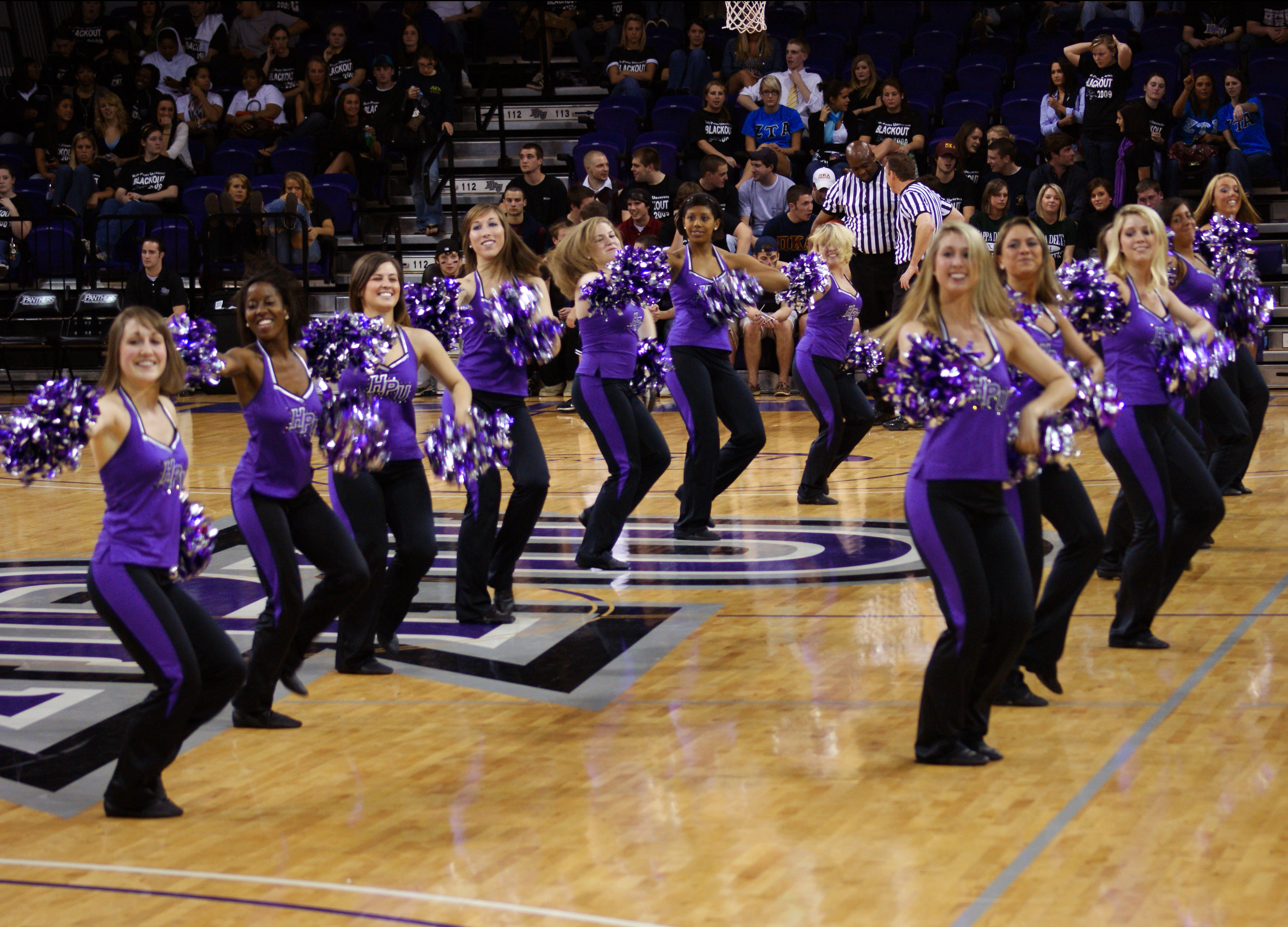
High Point dancers during a 2009 basketball game at Millis Center

The 2010–2011 season was the most successful since High Point University joined NCAA Division I in 1999–2000. In the fall, the women's soccer team and women's volleyball team won Big South Tournaments and the men's soccer team won the Big South regular season. In the spring, the women's lacrosse team won the National Lacrosse Conference tournament and set a record for wins by a first-year program, with 15.

In 2016, Christine Rickert of the High Point University women's track and field team qualified to compete in the U.S. Olympic Team Trials in Eugene, Oregon. Rickert placed 12th in the javelin throw, just nine places away from a spot on the Olympic Team. She remains the Big South Conference Record Holder in javelin with a throw of 52.47 m (172.2 ft).

High Point University also fields the following sports at the club level: men's and women's basketball, men's and women's golf, men's and women's lacrosse, men's rowing, running, men's and women's soccer, men's and women's swimming, men's and women's tennis, women's field hockey, softball, ultimate frisbee, equestrian and ice hockey.

Donations to High Point University's Athletic Department have exceeded $30 million. The primary athletics facilities at High Point University are the Qubein Center (basketball), Millis Center (volleyball), Williard Stadium (baseball), and the Witcher Athletic Center at Vert Stadium (track, soccer, lacrosse).

At the beginning of 2017, High Point University announced plans for a new basketball arena and conference center to be built on campus. The facility will be named for High Point University president, Nido Qubein, and his wife, Mariana Qubein. Construction on the Nido and Mariana Qubein Arena and Conference Center began in 2018; the facility was originally projected to open in 2020, but construction was delayed due to COVID-19 issues. The facility opened in late September 2021, with the first basketball game to be played on November 4. The Qubein Center includes 4,500 arena seats, 2,500 conference center seats. It was also announced in early 2017 that the basketball court in the new arena was named after High Point men's head coach and High Point University alumnus Tubby Smith. Smith and his wife, Donna, donated $1 million to the construction of the new facility. In 2026, the men's basketball team earned its first NCAA tournament victory, defeating fifth-seeded Wisconsin 83–82 in the first round as a No. 12 seed.

== Publications and media ==
- The Apogee
- High Point University Magazine
- HPU+
- Infinite Space
- The Lighted Lamp
- Zenith, the yearbook

== Sechrest Gallery ==
A permanent collection of original works was donated to the university by High Point Alumnus Darrell L. Sechrest. The collection includes works by Christian Dietrich, Sir Lawrence Alma-Tadema, Sir Joshua Reynolds, Allesandro Gherardini, El Greco, George Harvey, Emile Louis Picault, Elsie Popkin, and Antonio Zucchi, and Angelica Kauffman. The gallery is housed within the Hayworth Fine Arts Center.

== Notable faculty ==
- Ruth Bellamy – writer, actress, and poet
- Charmaine Cadeau – writer, poet
- Francisco Laguna Correa – writer, ethnographer, cultural critic
- Mark Martin – former Chief Justice of the North Carolina Supreme Court

== Notable alumni ==
- Cody Allen – professional baseball player
- Dick Culler – professional baseball player
- Austin Dillon – professional racing driver
- Harrison Rhodes – professional racing driver
- Jagger Jones – professional racing driver
- Donna Fargo – singer/songwriter
- John Gillespie – politician
- Issa Konare – professional basketball player
- Gene Littles – professional basketball player and coach
- Jacklyn Harold Lucas – Medal of Honor recipient
- Robert R. Merhige, Jr. – judge
- Jonathan Miller – politician
- Taylor Milne – Canadian Olympic track runner
- Nido R. Qubein – seventh president of High Point University, businessman, motivational speaker, author
- Arizona Reid – professional basketball player
- Andre Scrubb – professional baseball player
- Jaime Schultz – professional baseball player
- Tubby Smith – college basketball coach
