= Chestnut Hill Historic District (Asheville, North Carolina) =

US national historic district in Asheville, Buncombe County, North Carolina

- U.S. National Register of Historic Places
- U.S. Historic district
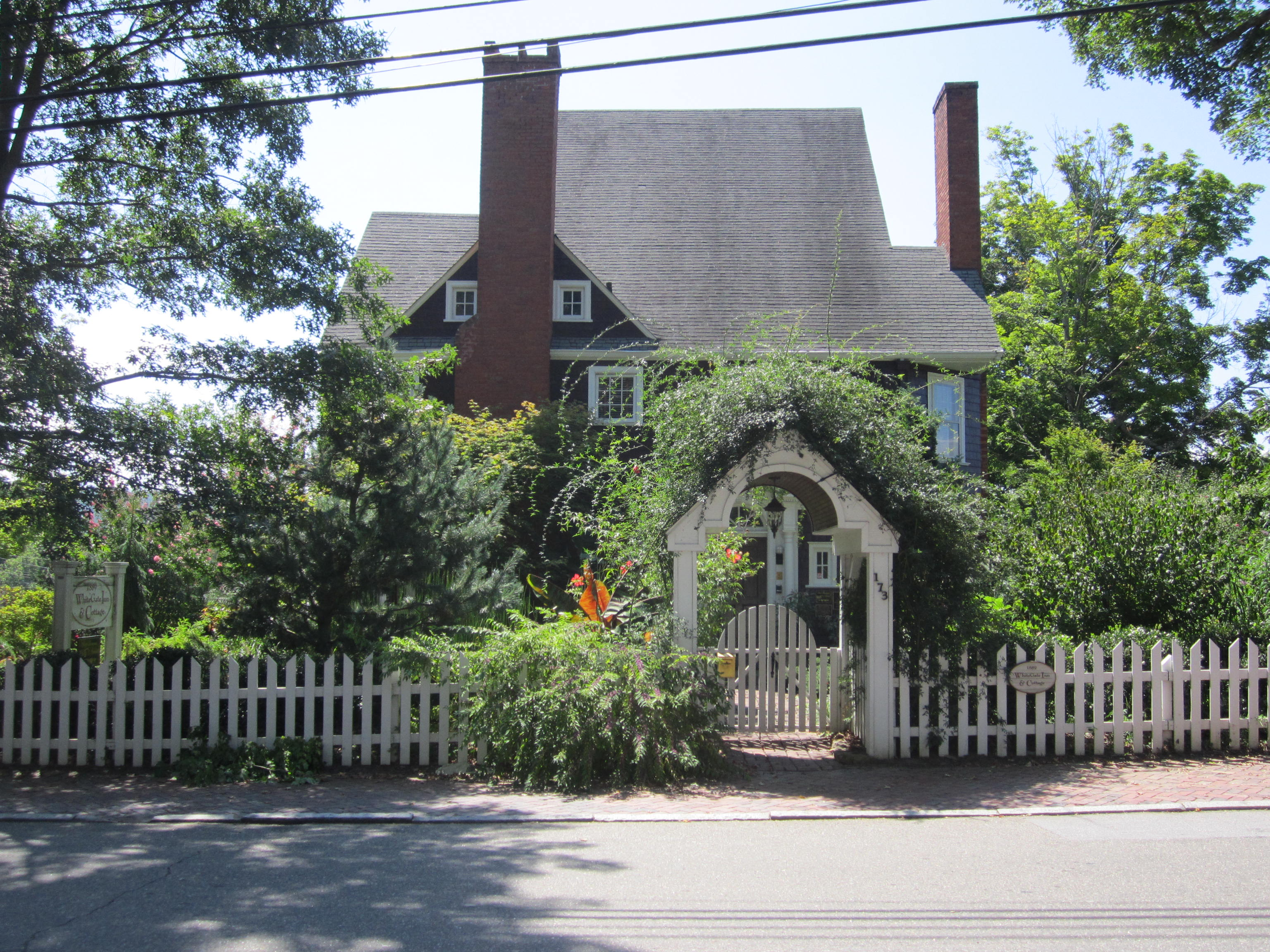
- Kent House, 2012

- Location within North Carolina Location within the United States
- Location: Roughly bounded by Hillside, Washington, Broad, Hollywood, Orchards Sts. and Merrimon Ave., Asheville, North Carolina
- Coordinates: 35°36′13″N 82°32′55″W
- Area: 55 acres (22 ha)
- Architect: Smith, R.S.; Tennent, J.A.
- Architectural style: Colonial Revival, Queen Anne, Bungalow
- NRHP reference No.: 83001837
- Added to NRHP: March 17, 1983

Chestnut Hill Historic District is a national historic district located at Asheville, Buncombe County, North Carolina. The district encompasses 238 contributing buildings and 1 contributing structure in a predominantly residential section of Asheville. It was developed in the late-19th and early-20th century and includes Colonial Revival, Queen Anne-influenced, and bracketed Victorian style dwellings. At least eight of the houses were designed by architect Richard Sharp Smith.

It was listed on the National Register of Historic Places in 1983.

== Gallery ==
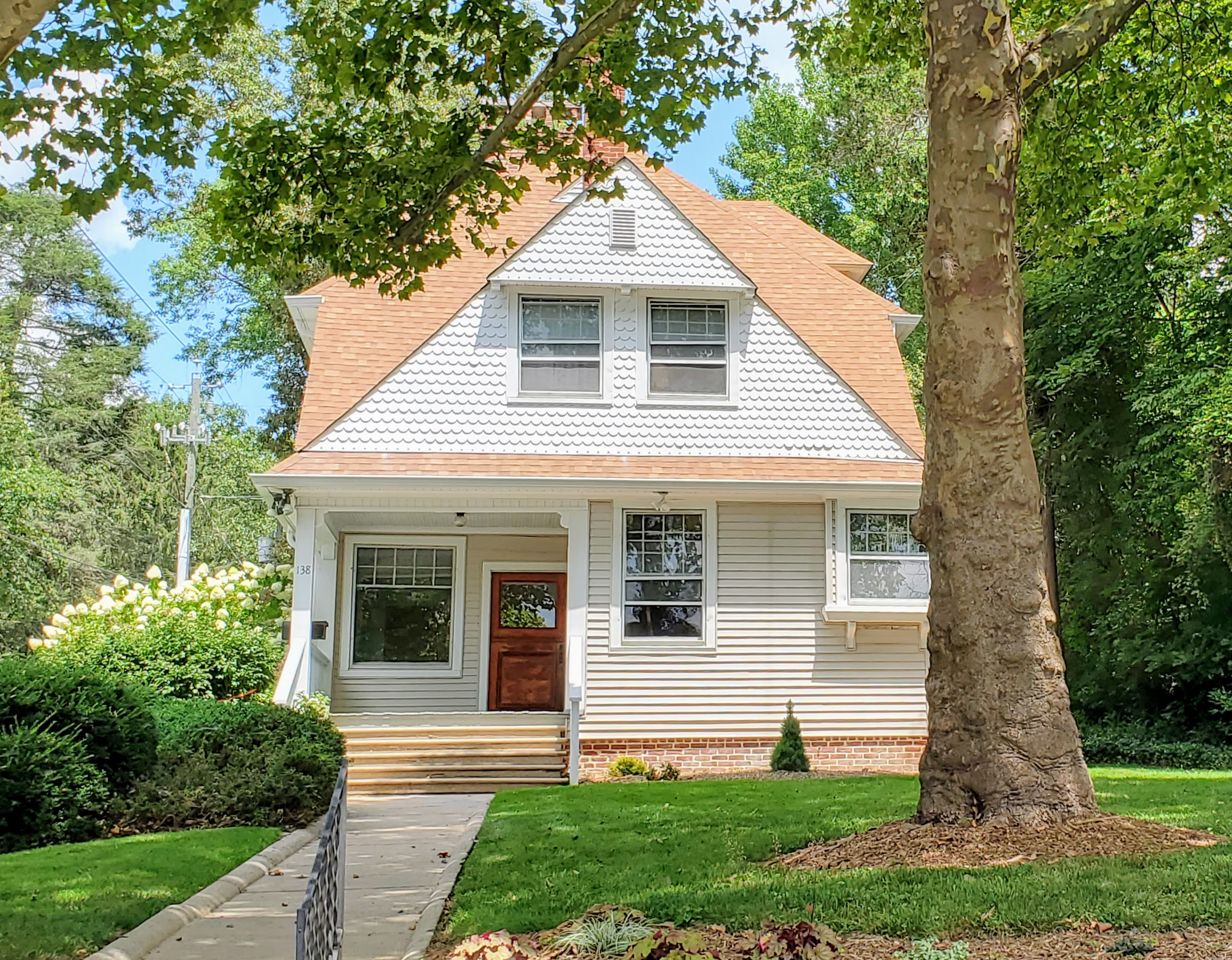
Dr. J.E. David Rental Cottage, 2021

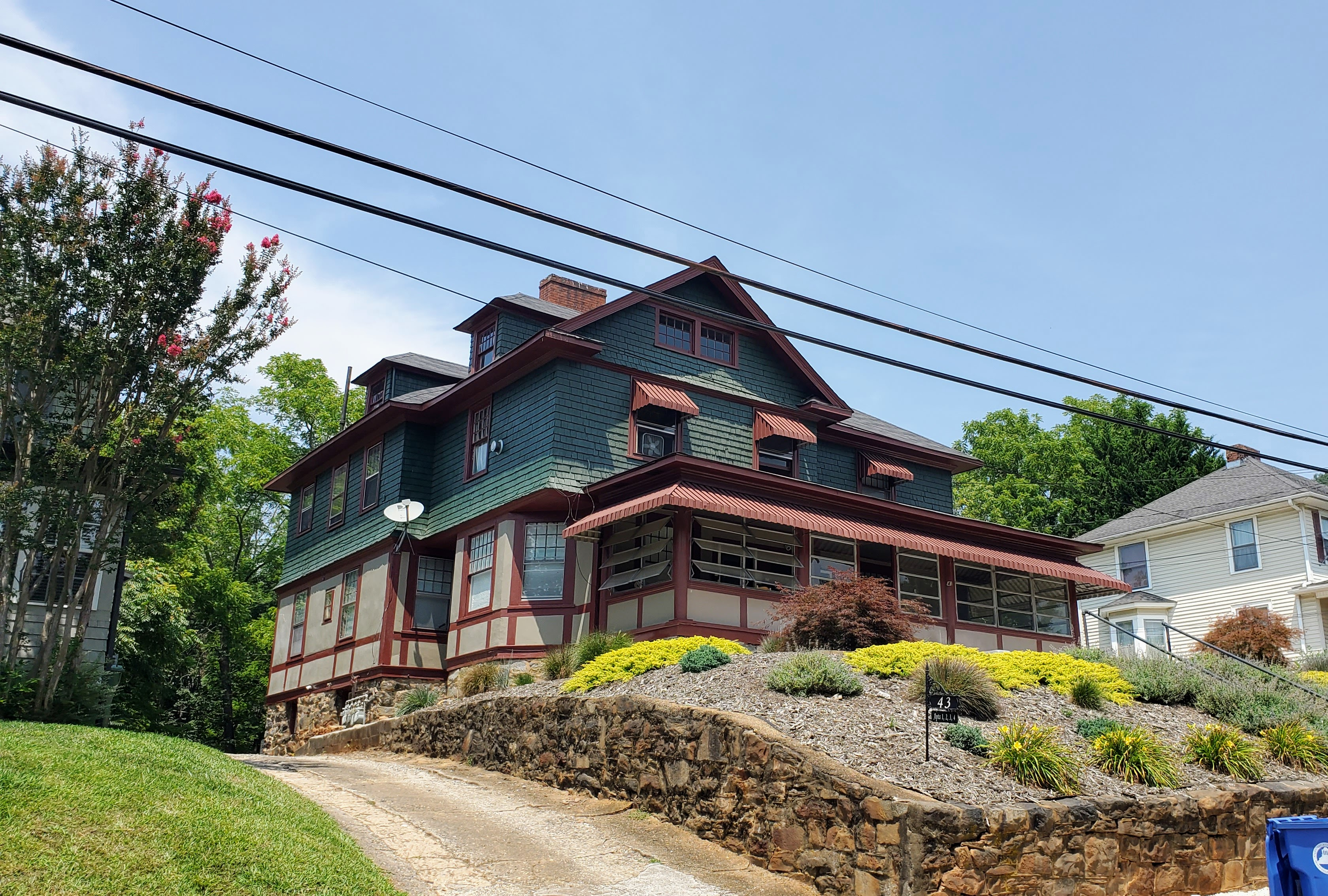
43 Arlington Street, 2021

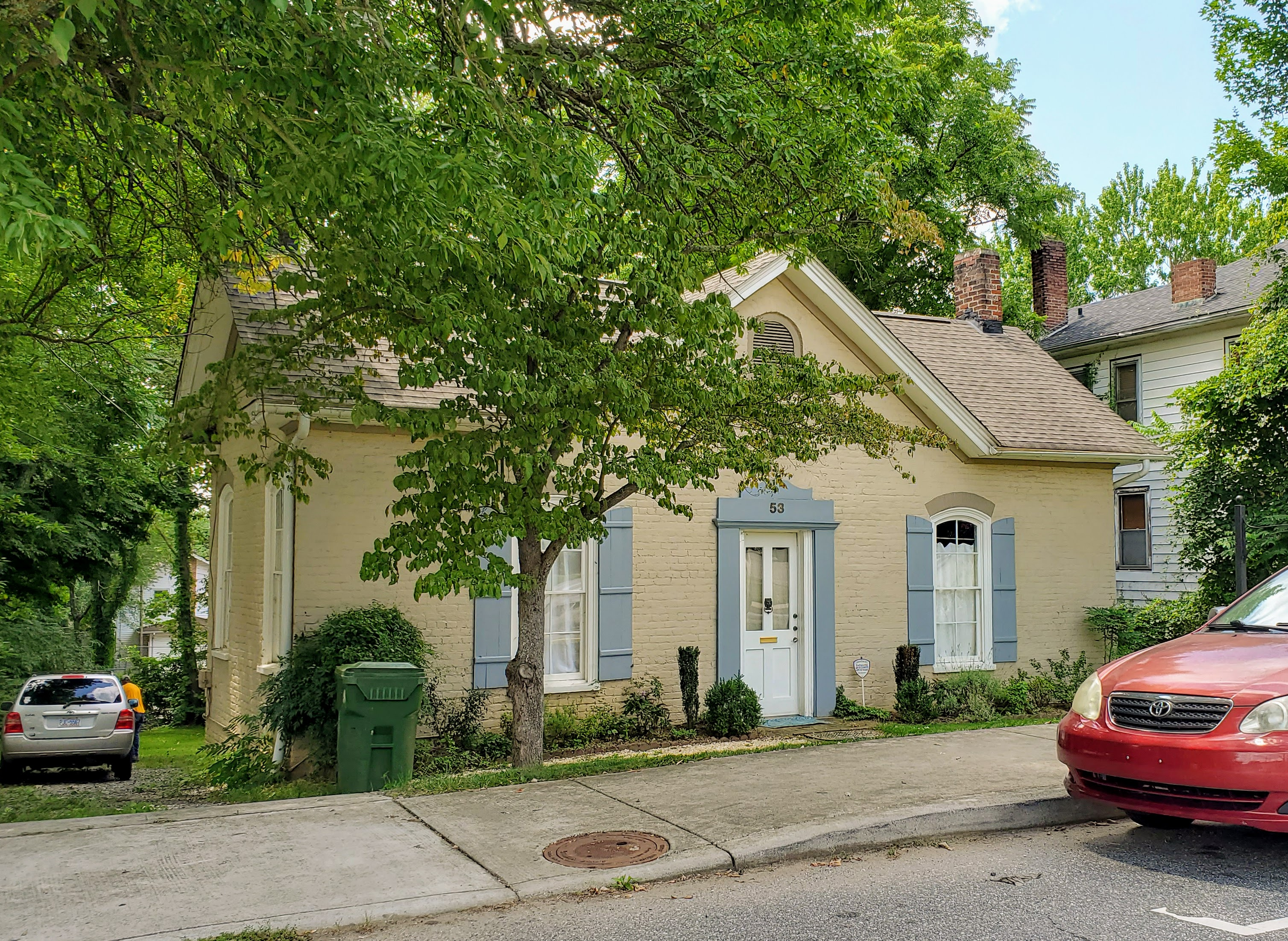
53 Orange St., 2021

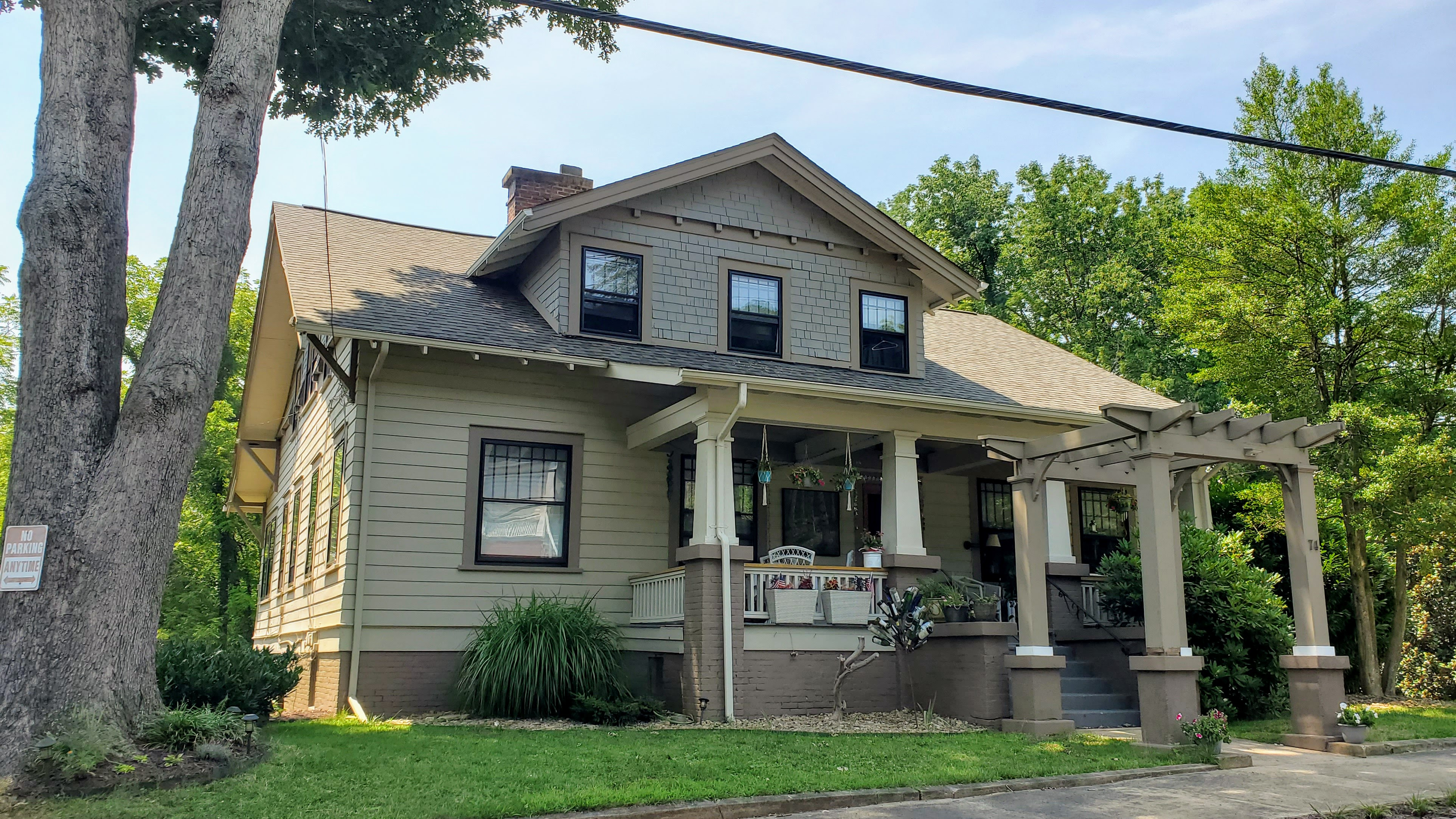
74 Furman Avenue, 2021

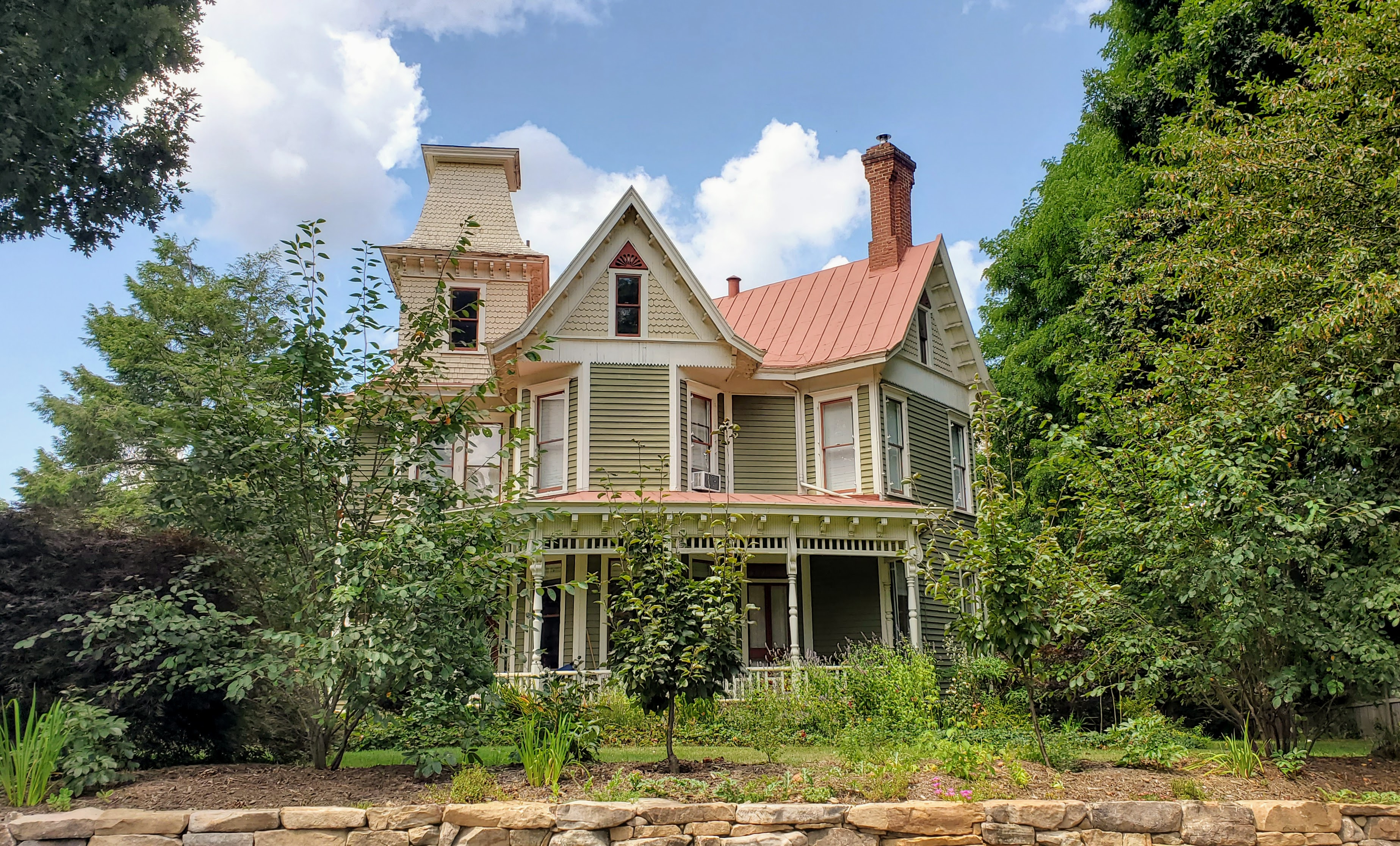
76 N. Liberty St., 2021

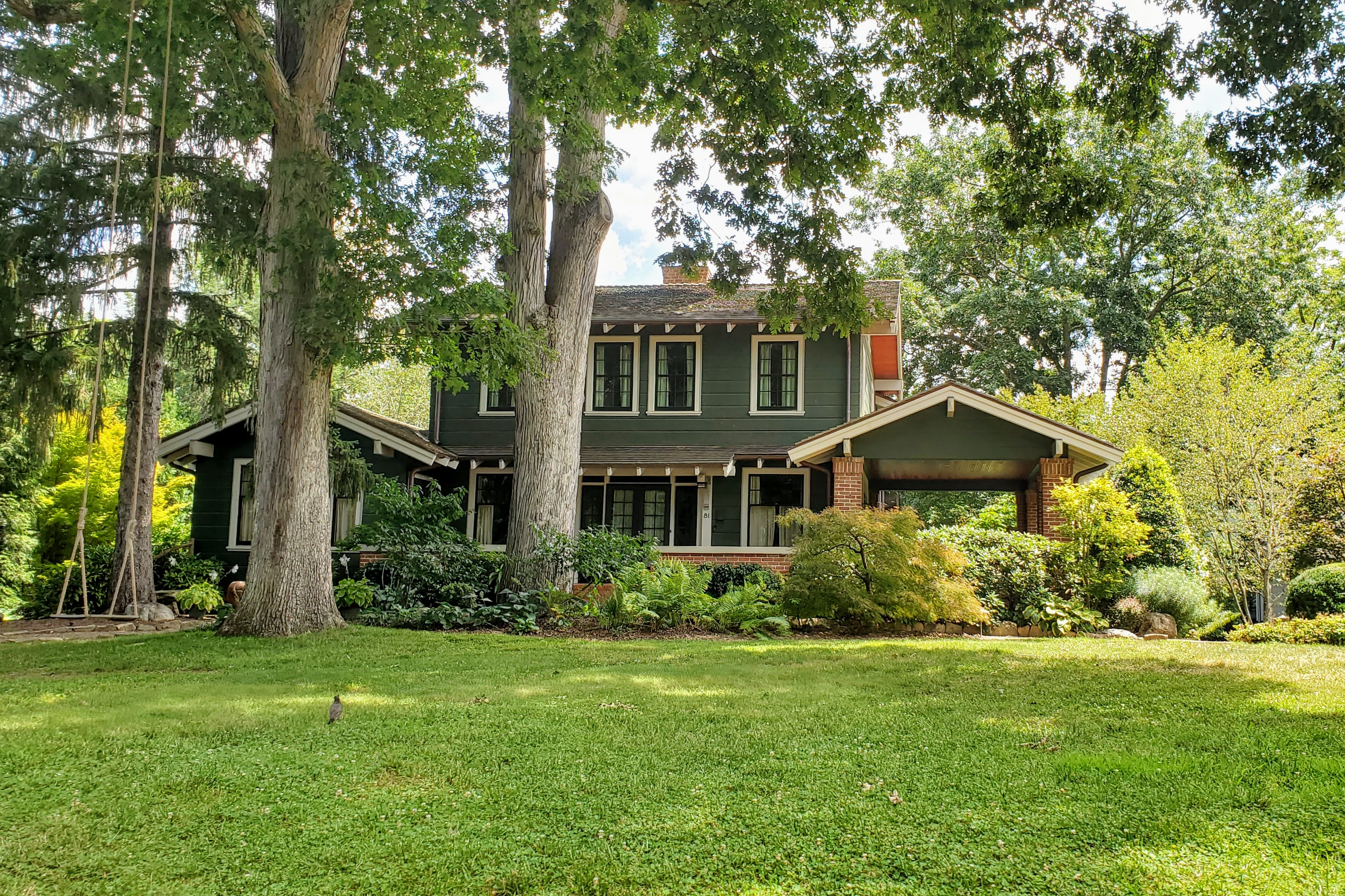
81 N. Liberty St., 2021

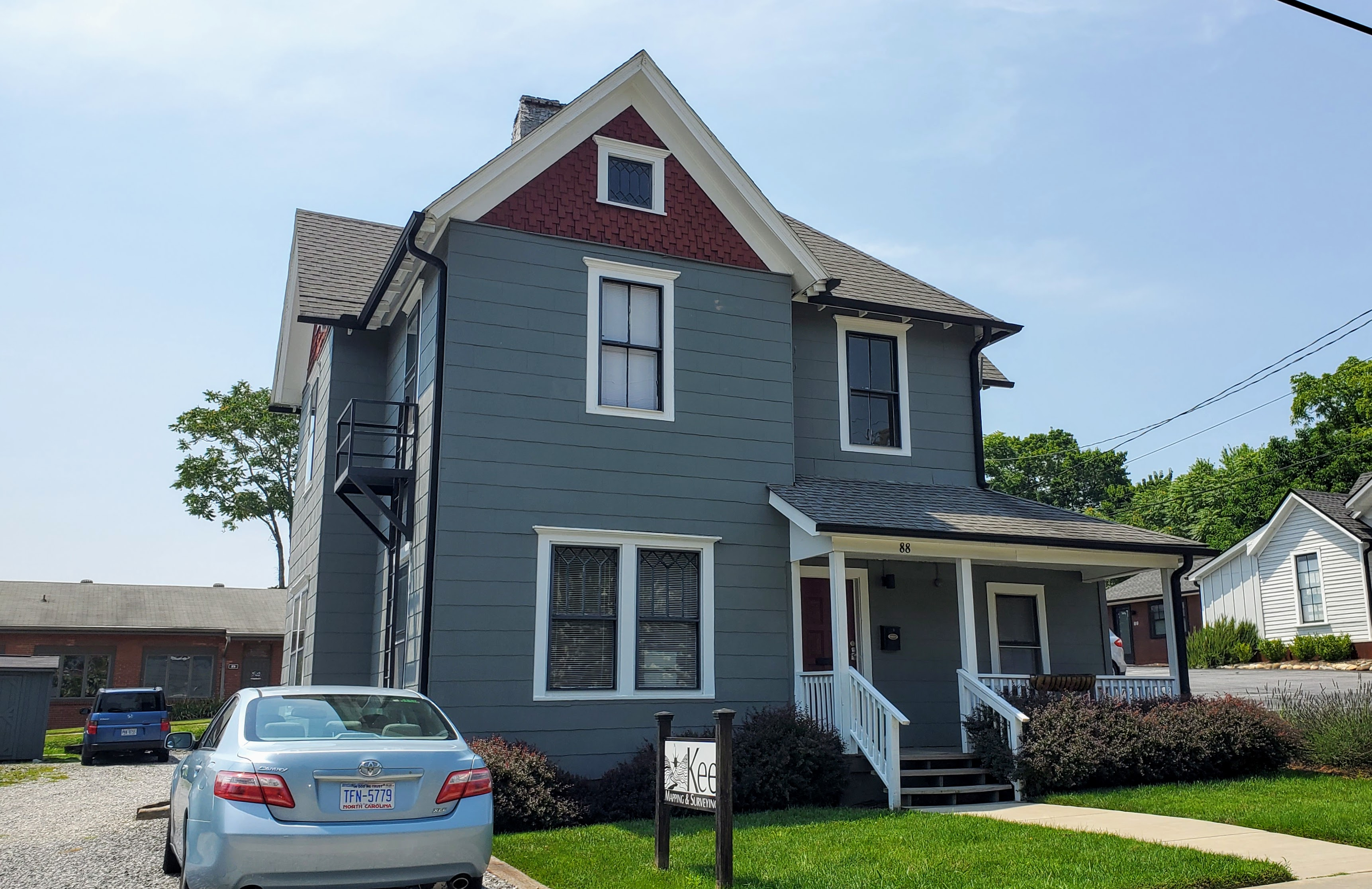
88 Central Avenue, 2021

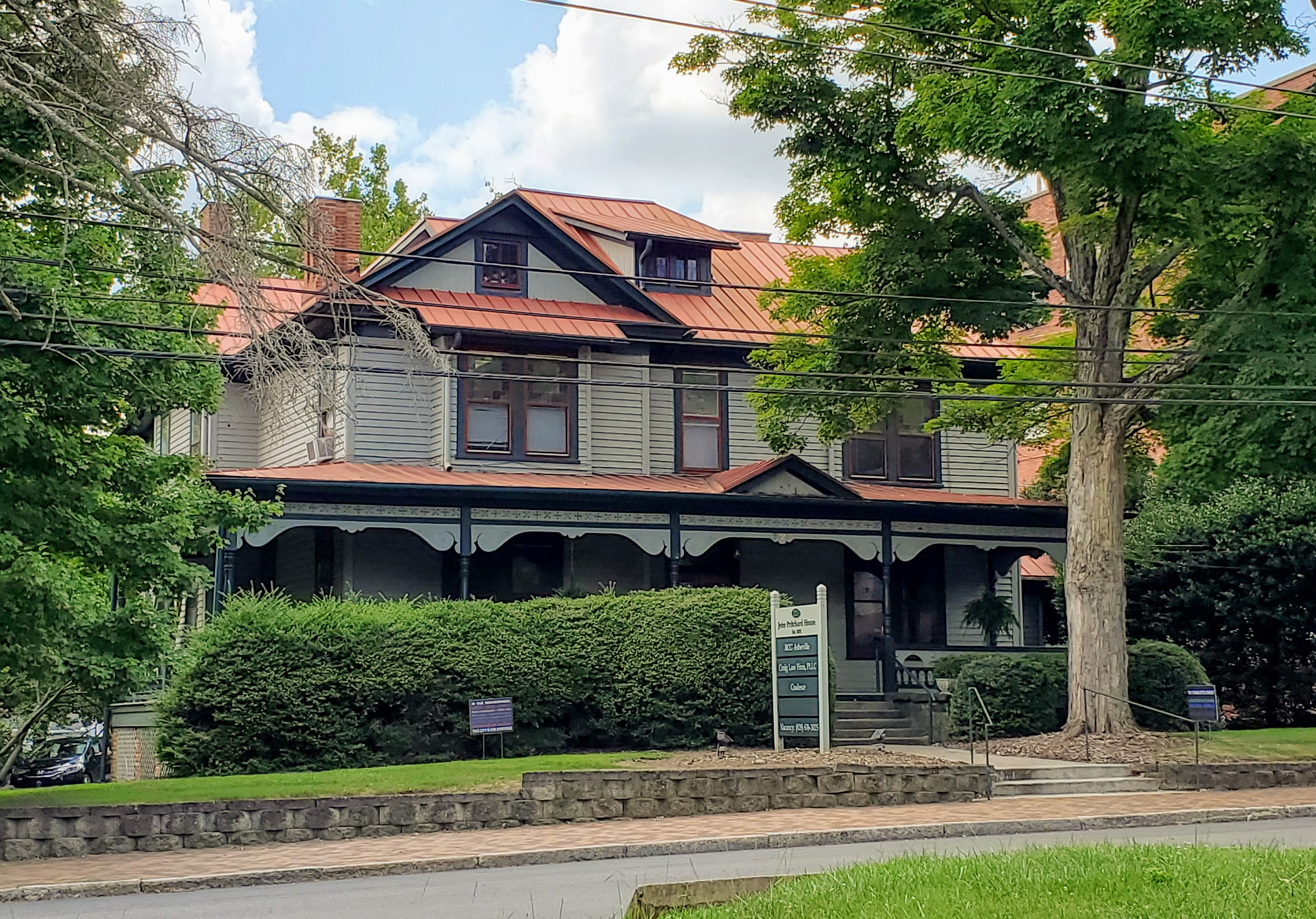
223 E. Chestnut St., 2021

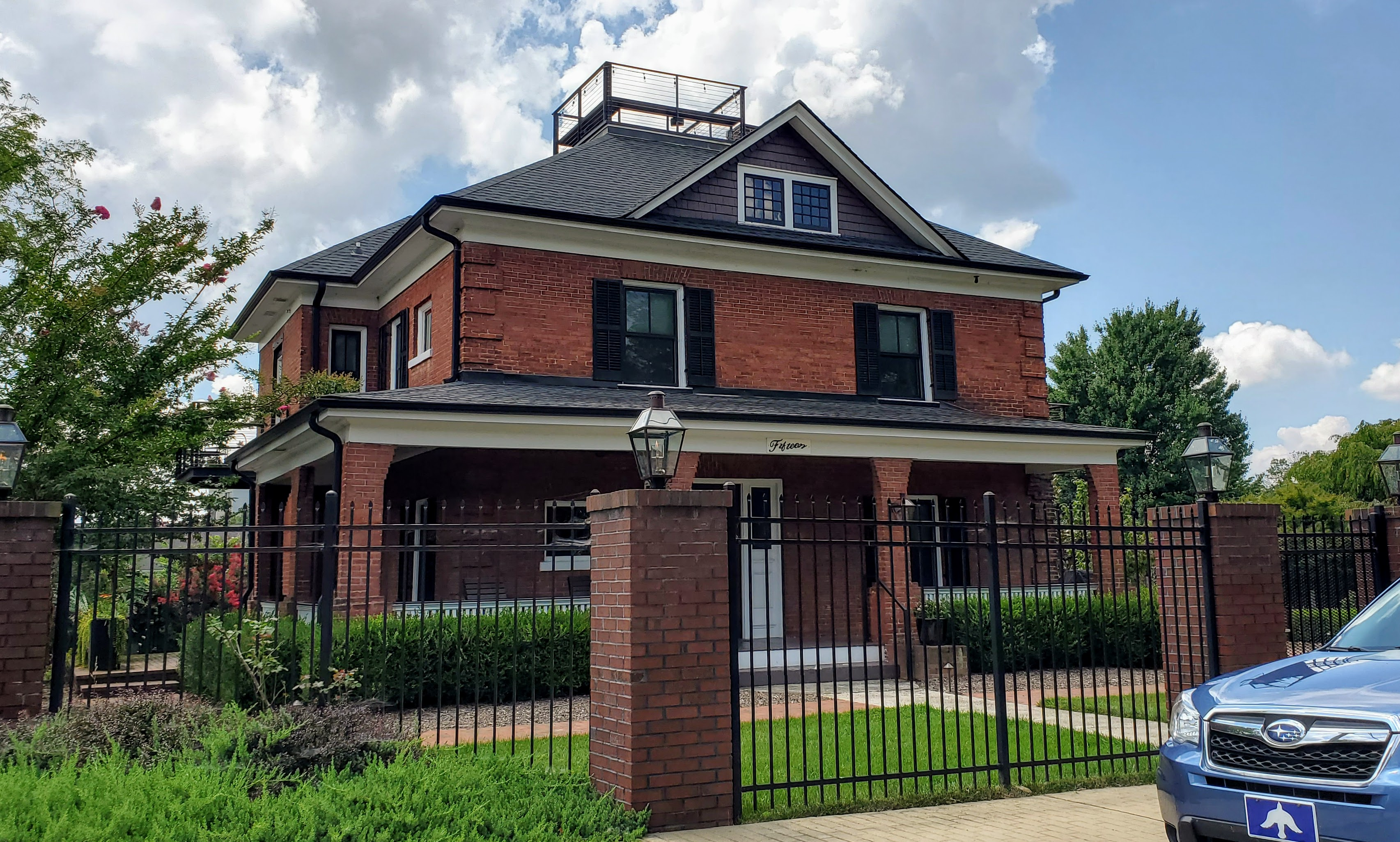
Albert Bunn House, 2021

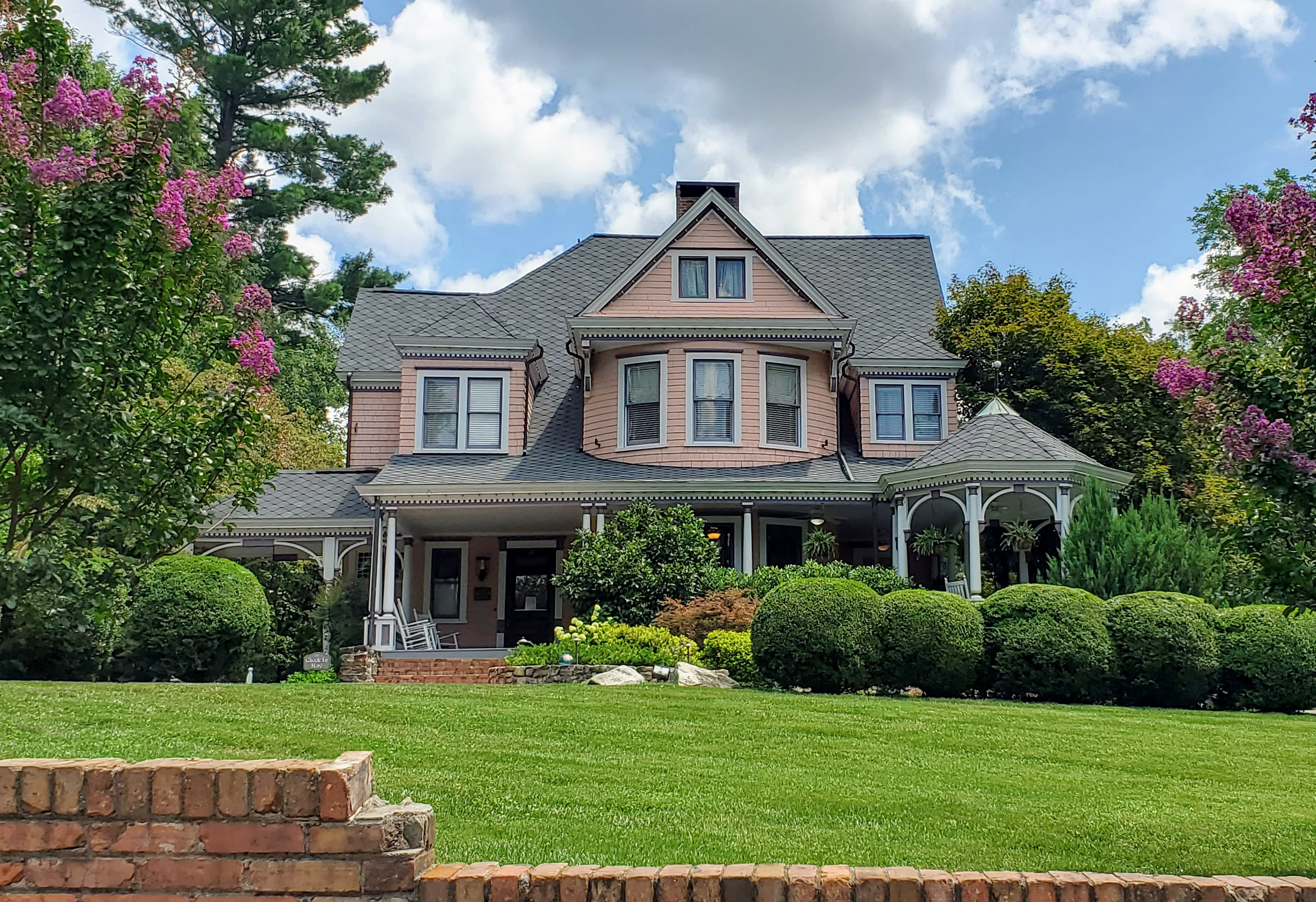
Beaufort Lodge (Theodore F. Davidson House), 2021

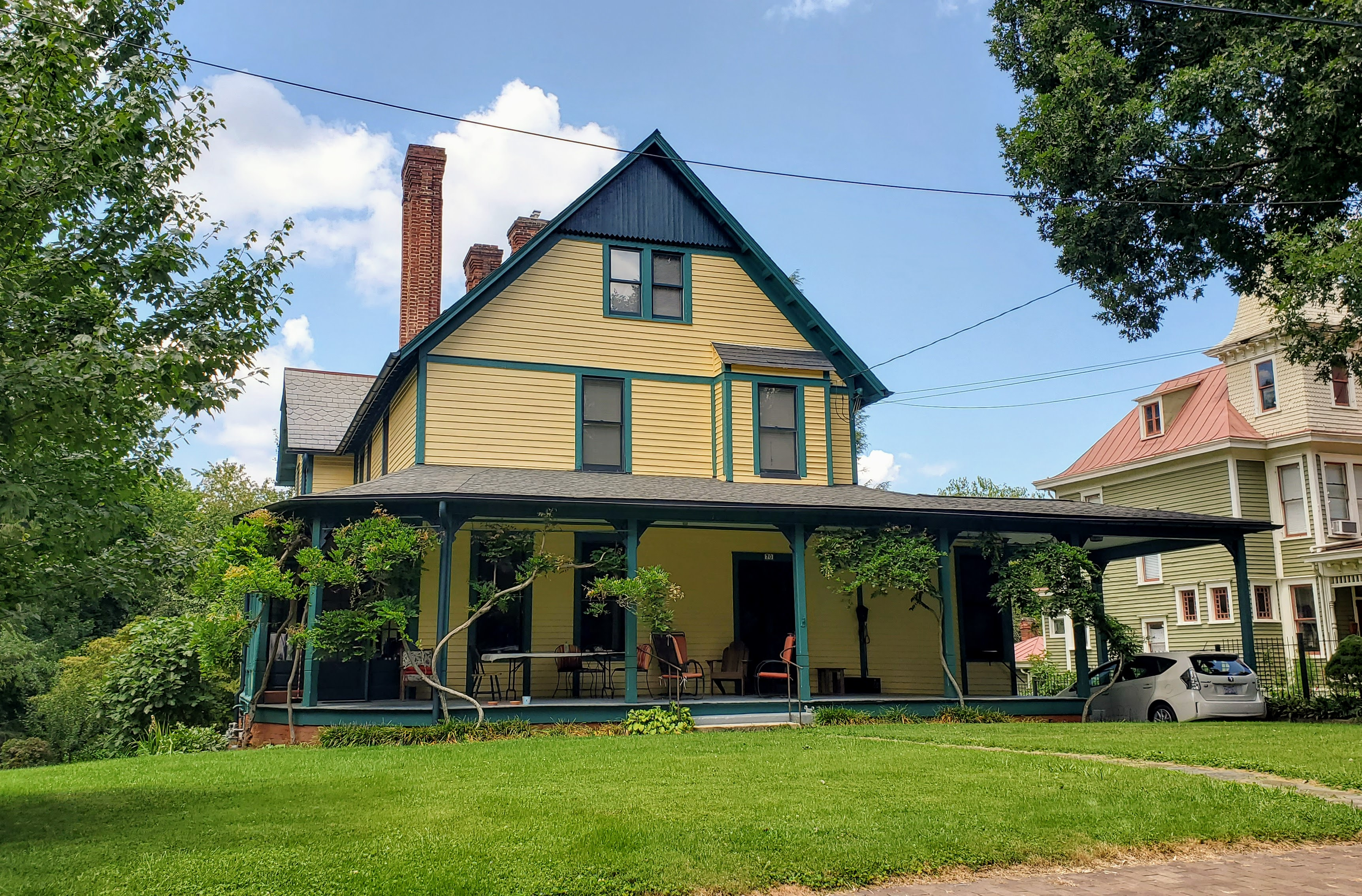
Dr. J. Hardy Lee House, 2021

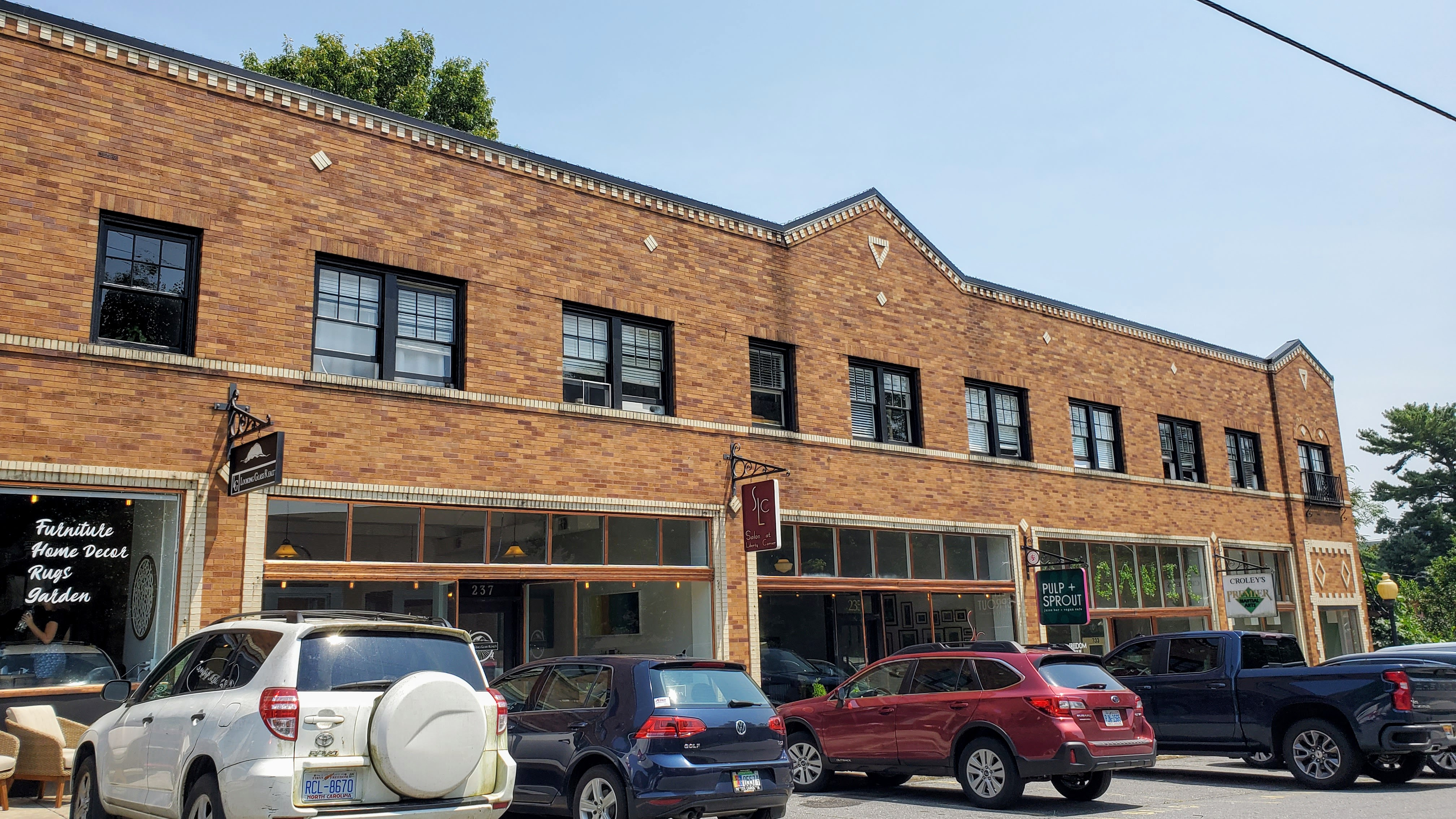
Lowe Building, 2021

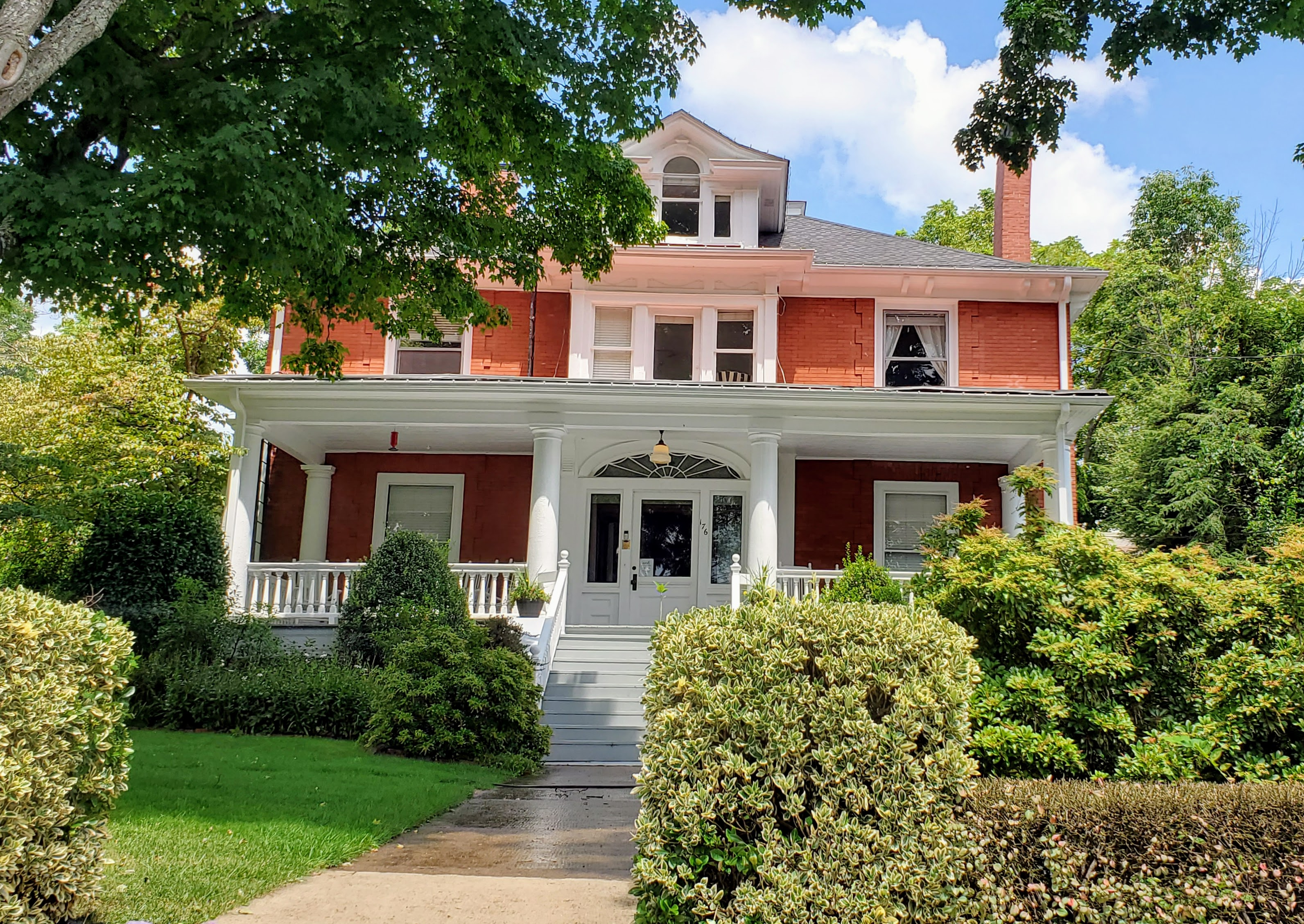
William R, Whitson House, 2021
