= Robert V. Davidson =

American lawyer and politician (1853–1925)

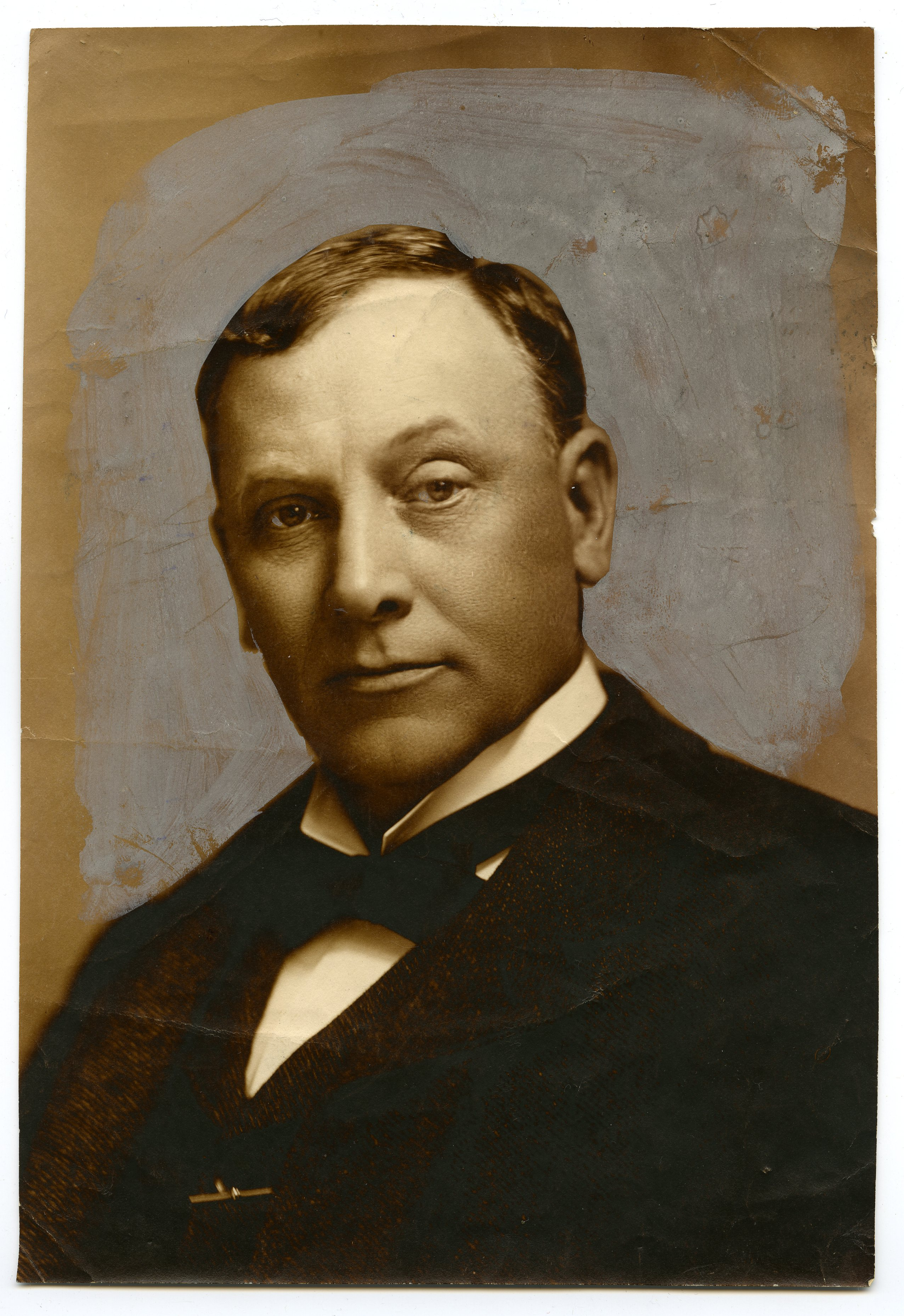

Texas Attorney General
- In office 1904–1910
- Preceded by: Charles K. Bell
- Succeeded by: Jewel P. Lightfoot

Member of the Texas Senate from the 17th district
- In office January 8, 1901 – August 6, 1904
- Preceded by: John E. Linn
- Succeeded by: W. M. Holland

Personal details
- Born: Robert Vance Davidson; July 23, 1853 Murphy, North Carolina, US
- Died: July 3, 1925 (aged 71) Dallas, Texas, US
- Party: Democratic
- Relations: Zebulon Vance; Thomas McKinney Jack (father-in-law); William Houston Jack (grandfather-in-law); William Pitt Ballinger (in-law); James E. Harrison (in-law); Robert Mills (in-law)
- Education: Bailey Law School
- Occupation: Lawyer, politician

Robert Vance Davidson (July 23, 1853 – July 3, 1925) was an American lawyer and politician. A Democrat, he was Texas Attorney General and a member of the Texas Senate.

== Early life and education ==
Davidson was born on July 23, 1853, in Murphy, North Carolina, the son of Allen Turner Davidson and Elizabeth (née Howell) Davidson. He was related to Zebulon Vance. He was educated at the school of Stephen Lee, then attended the Bailey Law School. In 1874, he was admitted to the bar, moving to Galveston, Texas the same year.

== Career ==
Davidson was district attorney from 1879 to c. 1883, and for fourteen years, was a member of its school board. He was a coauthor of the city charter following the 1900 Galveston hurricane.

Davidson was a Democrat. From January 8, 1901, to August 6, 1904, he was a member of the Texas Senate, representing the 17th district. The Texas State Historical Association erroneously claims he served in 1902 and 1903. While serving, he was chairman of the Committees on Towns and City Corporations and on Internal Improvements, as well as a member of the Committees on Commerce and Manufactures; on Counties and County Boundaries; on Educational Affairs; on Judicial Districts; on Judiciary No. 1; on Military Affairs; on Public Buildings and Grounds; on Rules; and on State Affairs.

From 1904 to 1910, Davidson was the Texas Attorney General, as which he was involved with the Waters-Pierce Case, an antitrust lawsuit. He was an unsuccessful candidate in the 1910 Texas gubernatorial election, for which he campaigned on anti-Prohibitionism.

In January 1911, Davidson returned to his private practice, in Dallas. He worked as an anti-trust lawyer and was a member of the partnership Davidson & Hawkins.

== Personal life and death ==
On July 16, 1879, Davidson married Laura Harrison Jack, the daughter of Thomas McKinney Jack and granddaughter of William Houston Jack; she was also related to William Pitt Ballinger, James E. Harrison, and Robert Mills. He and his wife had four or five children together. He was a member of the Texas branch of the Sons of the American Revolution. He died on July 3, 1925, aged 71, in Dallas and was buried at Lakeview Cemetery, in Galveston.
