= Kate and Charles Noel Vance House =

United States historic place

- U.S. National Register of Historic Places
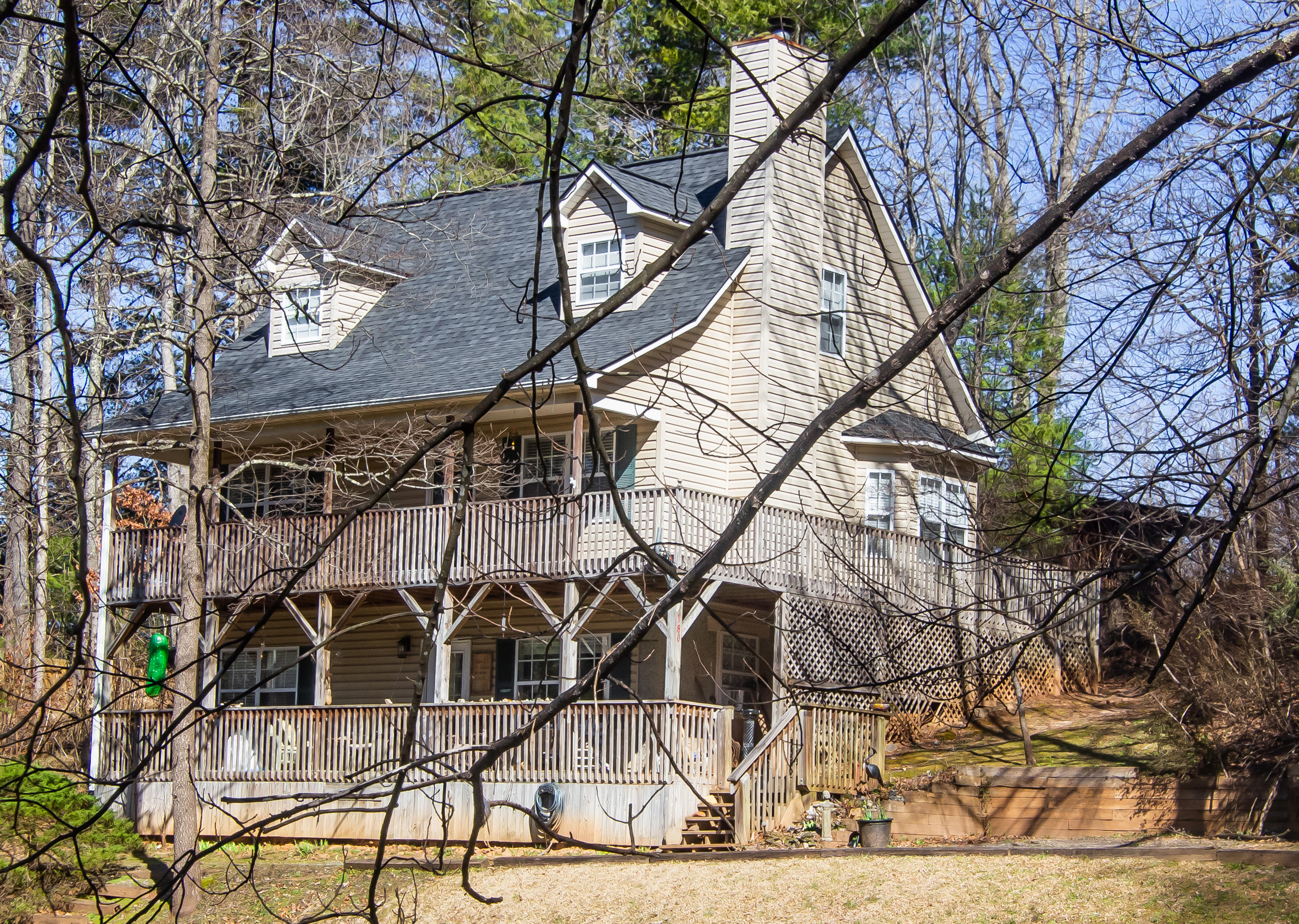
- Kate and Charles Noel Vance House (March 2021)

- Location within North Carolina Location within the United States
- Location: 178 Sunset Dr., Black Mountain, Buncombe County, North Carolina
- Coordinates: 35°36′47″N 82°18′43″W
- Built: 1894
- Architect: Allen L. Melton
- Architectural style: Queen Anne style architecture
- NRHP reference No.: 16000876
- Added to NRHP: December 20, 2016

Kate and Charles Noel Vance House is a mansion located in Black Mountain, Buncombe County, North Carolina. It was listed on the National Register of Historic Places in 2016.

== History ==
The house sits high on a hill on the east side of Black Mountain, at 178 Sunset Drive, about one mile from the center of downtown. The two-and-a-half-story Queen Anne frame house, designed by Asheville-based architect Arthur L. Melton, was built around 1894. The building faces west and overlooks the central business district and Interstate. The building is about a mile from downtown Black Mountain.

Charles Noel Vance, son of North Carolina Senator Zebulon Baird Vance and his wife Kate, owned the property. During his father's time in the United States Senate, Vance served him as his secretary.
