= Yadkin College Historic District =

Historic district in North Carolina, United States

- U.S. National Register of Historic Places
- U.S. Historic district
- Location within North Carolina Location within the United States
- Location: N and S sides of SR 1194 W of SR 1436, Yadkin College, North Carolina
- Coordinates: 35°52′32″N 80°22′56″W
- Area: 125 acres (51 ha)
- Built: 1856
- Architect: Owen, H. Bentley
- Architectural style: Colonial Revival, Gothic Revival
- MPS: Davidson County MRA
- NRHP reference No.: 88000165
- Added to NRHP: February 25, 1988

Yadkin College Historic District is a national historic district located at Yadkin College, Davidson County, North Carolina. The district encompasses 38 contributing buildings, 4 contributing sites, and 5 contributing structures in the village of Yadkin College. The contributing buildings include the 1856 Yadkin College building, one antebellum house, 11 houses built between about 1870 and 1890, and the Yadkin College Methodist Protestant Church (1886). The sites are the Yadkin College Cemetery, the site of the 1881 Yadkin College building, site of the Methodist Episcopal Church, and site of the post office, blacksmith shop and jail. The structures are traditional wells and corn cribs.

It was added to the National Register of Historic Places in 1988.
