= Jewel P. Lightfoot =

American lawyer and politician (1873–1950)

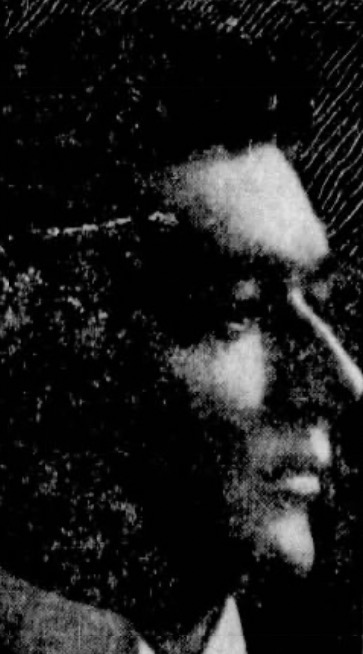

Texas Attorney General
- In office January 1, 1910 – 1912
- Governor: Thomas Mitchell Campbell
- Preceded by: Robert V. Davidson
- Succeeded by: James D. Walthall

Personal details
- Born: Jewel Preston Lightfoot; January 21, 1873 Columbia County, Arkansas, US
- Died: July 14, 1950 (aged 77) Fort Worth, Texas, US
- Occupation: Lawyer, politician

Jewel Preston Lightfoot (January 21, 1873 – July 14, 1950) was an American lawyer and politician. He was the Texas Attorney General from 1910 to 1912.

== Biography ==
Lightfoot was born on January 21, 1873, in Columbia County, Arkansas, the son of Elijah Ward Lightfoot and Lucy Adele (née Reynolds) Lightfoot. His family returned to their home, Pittsburg, Texas, the same year of his birth. Educated at public schools, he graduated from Jeff Davis College, in Pittsburg, in 1890. He worked the night shift as a railroad telegraphist in Abilene and Mineola, among other places. He read law in the mean time, subsequently being admitted to the bar.

In 1898, Lightfoot was elected district attorney of Camp County, serving three terms. From 1905 to 1910, he served as assistant Texas Attorney General, under Robert V. Davidson, as which he led the prosecution in the Waters-Pierce Case. He served as Attorney General from January 1, 1910, until his resignation in 1912, having been appointed by Governor Thomas Mitchell Campbell. He was succeeded by his assistant, James D. Walthall.

After resigning, Lightfoot returned to practicing law, in Austin. From 1918 to 1926, he represented Wilson & Co., a Chicago meat-packing company. He then moved to Fort Worth and became a member of the law firm Lightfoot, Robertson, Saunders, & Gano.

On September 15, 1896, Lightfoot married Fredonia Baudouin, with whom he had five children. He was a Freemason – having written several books on Masonic law – as well as a member of the Knights Templar. He died on July 14, 1950, aged 77, in Fort Worth, and was buried on July 16, at the Texas State Cemetery, in Austin. A collection of his papers was compiled and published by Westphalia Press.
