= Robert Dick Douglas =

American lawyer (1875–1960)

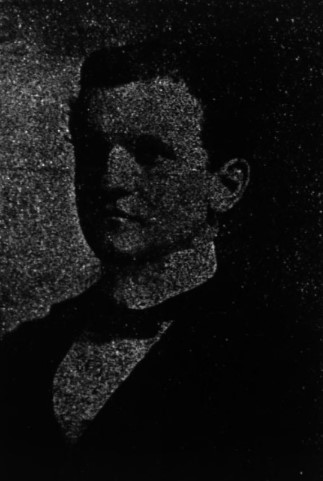
- Douglas c. 1901

34th Attorney General of North Carolina
- In office 1900–1901
- Governor: Daniel L. Russell
- Preceded by: Zeb V. Walser
- Succeeded by: Robert D. Gilmer

Personal details
- Born: April 7, 1875 Greensboro, North Carolina, U.S.
- Died: January 1, 1960 (aged 84) High Point, North Carolina, U.S.
- Party: Republican
- Spouse: Virginia Land Brown (m. 1909)
- Relations: Stephen A. Douglas (grandfather); Robert P. Dick (grandfather)
- Children: 5
- Parent(s): Robert M. Douglas; Jessie Madeline Dick
- Education: Georgetown University

Robert Dick Douglas Sr. (April 7, 1875 – January 1, 1960) was a North Carolina attorney who served as North Carolina Attorney General briefly from 1900 to 1901. He is believed to be the youngest attorney general in the state's history.

== Early life and education ==
Douglas was born on April 7, 1875, in Greensboro, North Carolina. Robert was the first son and second child of Robert M. Douglas and Jessie Madeline Dick. He was a grandson of Sen. Stephen A. Douglas of Illinois and of Robert P. Dick, a North Carolina state Supreme Court justice. Douglas graduated from Georgetown University and "read the law" under his grandfather Dick.

== Career ==
At the age of 25, Douglas was appointed by Gov. Daniel L. Russell to serve out the remainder of Attorney General Zeb V. Walser's term. At the time of his appointment, he was the youngest person to ever serve as North Carolina Attorney General and the youngest person serving as a state attorney general in the country. After that he built a practice of law in Greensboro, North Carolina, where he also served as postmaster from 1906 to 1916.

In 1932, Douglas gave or sold his grandfather Stephen A. Douglas's papers to the University of Chicago.

== Personal life ==
He married his wife, Virginia Land Brown, on April 14, 1909. They had five children: two sons and three daughters. He died on January 1, 1960, in High Point, North Carolina.

== Sources ==
- New York Times, December 24, 1900
- Stephen Douglas Genealogy
- Robert Dick Douglas, Jr., The Best 90 Years of My Life, 2007

Legal offices
Preceded by Zeb V. Walser	Attorney General of North Carolina; 1900–1901	Succeeded by Robert D. Gilmer
