= Allen L. Melton =

American architect

- Born: 1852; Morgantown, North Carolina
- Died: April 27, 1917 (aged 64–65)
- Citizenship: Carolina
- Occupation: Architect
- Known for: Designer of houses
- Notable work: Kate and Charles Noel Vance House

Allen L. Melton (1852 – April 27, 1917) was an architect in North Carolina.

He was born in Morgantown, North Carolina.

He designed Asheville mayor and North Carolina Attorney General Theodore F. Davidson's home. He designed Kate and Charles Noel Vance House.

He had an office in the Sondley Building.

== Work ==
- Kate and Charles Noel Vance House
- Home of Theodore F. Davidson
- Drhumor Building (1895)
- Haywood County Courthouse in Wayneseville
- American National Bank Building
- Asheville Female College
- Maxwelton Building
- Allen Industrial School on College Street
