= William Henry Bailey =

American politician

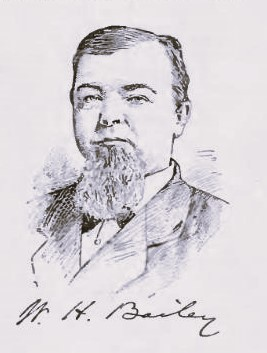
William Henry Bailey

William Henry Bailey (January 22, 1831 – August 17, 1908) was an American author, lawyer, and politician. He was the North Carolina Attorney General and served in the North Carolina General Assembly. He co-founded and taught law at the Bailey Law School.

== Early life ==
Bailey was born at Mt.Pleasant in Pasquotank County, North Carolina. His parents were Priscilla Elizabeth Brownrigg and John Lancaster Bailey. His father was a member of the North Carolina House and Senate, a North Carolina Superior Court judge. In the early 1840s, the family moved to Hillsborough, North Carolina where his father practiced law.

Bailey attended the Bingham School and the Caldwell Institute in Hillsborough, North Carolina. He attended the University of North Carolina. He studied law under his father.

== Career ==
Bailey received his law license in 1851 and received his license to practice before the North Carolina Supreme Court in January 1852. He practiced law in Hillsborough with his father. He was appointed the secretary at the North Carolina Democratic Party at its convention in May 1952.

He became the Attorney General of North Carolina in December 1856, completing an unexpired term. In April 1858, he moved his law practice to Yanceyville, North Carolina, but continued to serve courts in Orange, Alamance and Caswell Counties. He was elected the county attorney for Caswell County in 1858. In 1859 or 1860, he moved to Black Mountain, North Carolina with his father and opened the Bailey Law School. For a time, he joined the faculty of the school but it was primarily his father's venture.

On April 24, 1861, Bailey enlisted with the Bethel Regiment, First North Carolina Volunteers as a private. He fought at the Battle of Bethel Church and First Battle of Bull Run. Later, he was a judge advocate.

After the war, Bailey practiced law in Salisbury, North Carolina for ten years starting in early 1865. He also wanted to start a law school there, advertising that he had thirteen years of experience as a law teacher. He joined Nathaniel Boydon in the firm Boyden and Blackman. When Boydon was appointed to the North Carolina Supreme Court, Bailey joined the practice of James M. McCorkle. Governor William Woods Holden appointed Bailey to the position of state code commissioner on August 31, 1871. Bailey held this position until the post was eliminated in 1873.

In the fall of 1874, Bailey moved to Charlotte, North Carolina and practiced law with William Marcus Shipp. Shipp had just finished his term as North Carolina Attorney General and was a North Carolina Superior Court judge. Bailey formed a law partnership with former governor and United States Senator Zebulon Vance in June 1881.

In 1882, Bailey was elected to the North Carolina House of Representatives for Mecklenburg County as a Democrat in 1882. While in the legislature, he chaired the judiciary committee.

Bailey wrote several books, including The Effect of Civil War upon the Rights of Persons and Property and Conflict of Judicial Decisions. He received an honorary Doctor of Law degree in 1885 from Rutherford College.

== Personal life ==
Bailey married Anne Chamberlain Howerton of Hillsborough on October 20, 1852. They had five children, daughter Mrs. Archibald Lingan and sons William Henry Bailey Jr. Edmund H. Bailey, Campbell McCulloh Bailey, and Thomas H. Bailey.

He was a Mason and an Episcopalian.

In 1890, he retired and moved to Texas where his sons lived; he resided in Seabrook. On August 17, 1908, Bailey died at his son's home in Seabrook at the age of 77. He was interred in Glenwood Cemetery in Houston, Texas.

== Selected publications ==
- The Effect of Civil War upon the Rights of Persons and Property and Conflict of Judicial Decisions (1867)
- The Onus Probandi, Preparation for Trial and the Right to Open and Conclude. New York and Albany: Banks & Brothers Law Publishers, 1868.
- The State of Religion in the Province of North Carolina (1890)
- Battle of Great Bethel Church. Columbus, Ohio: Blue & Gray Enterprises, 1895.
- The Detective Faculty, As Illustrated from Judicial Records and the Actualities of Experience. Cincinnati: The Robert Clarke Company, 1896.
- The Regulators of North Carolina. (1896)
