= B. F. Looney =

American lawyer and politician (1859–1951)

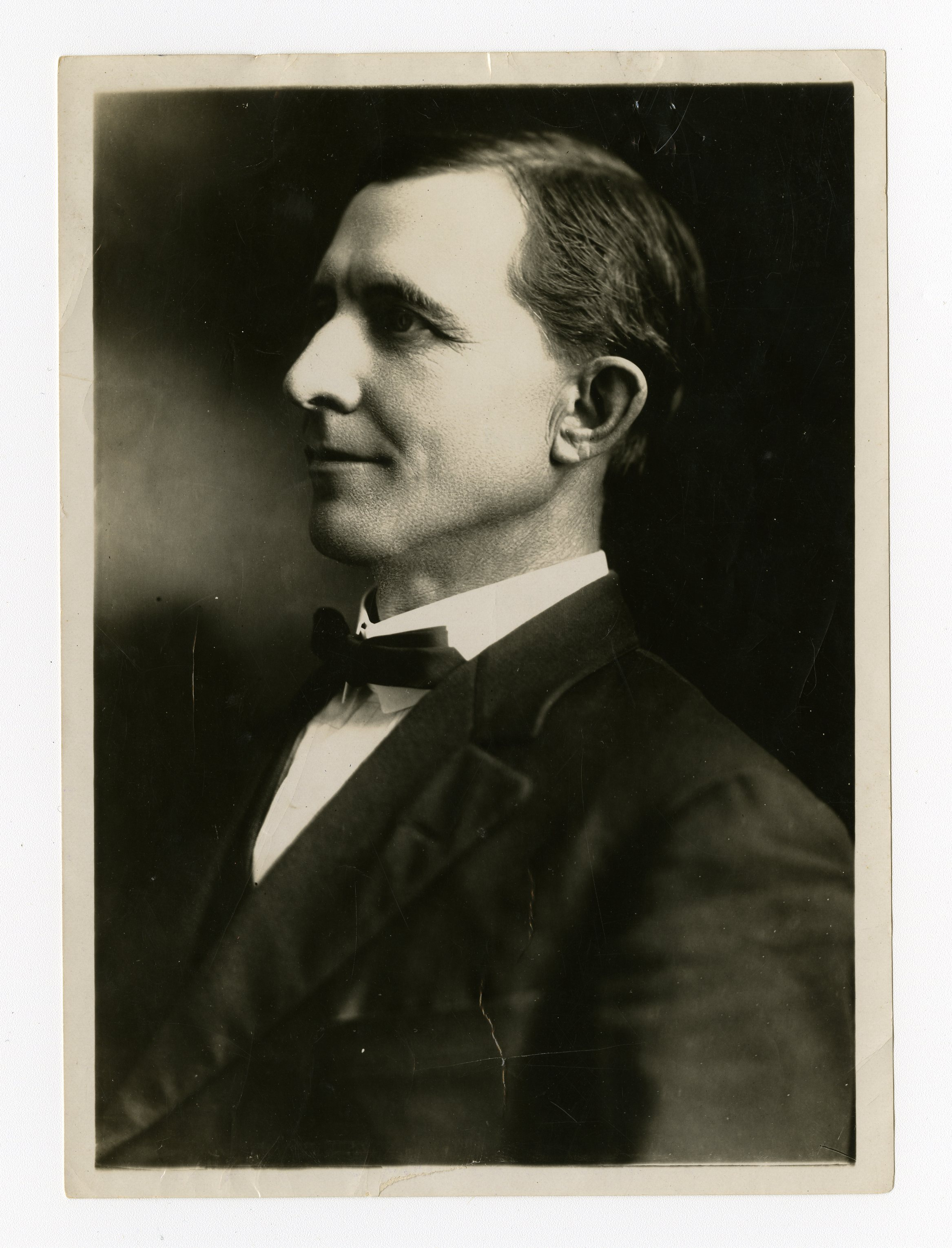

Texas Attorney General
- In office November 1912 – 1919
- Preceded by: James D. Walthall
- Succeeded by: Calvin Maples Cureton

Member of the Texas Senate from the 5th district
- In office January 10, 1905 – January 12, 1909
- Preceded by: Thomas M. Cain
- Succeeded by: Thomas W. Perkins

President Pro Tempore of the Texas Senate
- Preceded by: A. P. Barrett
- Succeeded by: James M. Terrell

Member of the Texas House of Representatives from the 33rd district
- In office July 26, 1910 – January 10, 1911

Personal details
- Born: Benjamin Franklin Looney; September 19, 1859 Bossier Parish, Louisiana, US
- Died: May 25, 1951 (aged 91) Dallas, Texas, US
- Party: Democratic
- Occupation: Lawyer, politician

Benjamin Franklin Looney (September 19, 1859 – May 25, 1951) was an American lawyer and politician. A Democrat, he was a member of both branches of the Texas Legislature and was later the Texas Attorney General.

== Early life, education, and early career ==
Looney was born on September 19, 1859, in Bossier Parish, Louisiana, the son of B. F. Looney and Josephine (née Frith) Looney. He was presumably named for Benjamin Franklin. After the death of his father, he and his mother moved to Marion County, Texas. Educated at local schools, he studied at the University of Mississippi and at the Cumberland School of Law, graduating from the latter in 1882, with a Bachelor of Laws. Admitted to the bar subsequently after graduation, he began practicing in Greenville.

== Politics ==
Looney was a Democrat. He was a member of the Texas Senate, from January 10, 1905, to January 12, 1909, representing the 5th district; he was also president pro tempore while in the Senate. He was a member of the Texas House of Representatives, from July 26, 1910, to January 10, 1911, representing the 33rd district. He supported organized labor, Prohibition, and bans on gambling.

In the Texas Legislature, Looney was chairman of the Senate Committee on Privileges and Elections and the Judiciary Committee No. 2, and was chairman of the House Committee on Reforms in Civil and Criminal Procedure. In the Senate, he was a member of the Committees on Constitutional Amendments; on Contingent Expenses; on Engrossed Bills; on Judicial Districts; on Public Land and Land Office; on State Affairs; and on Treasurer and Comptroller's Department. In the House, he was a member of the Committees on Common Carriers; on Constitutional Amendments; on Criminal Jurisprudence; on the Judiciary; on Privileges, Suffrage, and Elections; and on Revenue and Taxation.

Looney was the Texas Attorney General from November 1912 to 1919. From January 1, 1924, until his retirement on January 1, 1949, he was an associate justice of the Texas 5th District Court, having been appointed by Governor Pat Morris Neff. He was once a gubernatorial candidate.

== Personal life and death ==
On March 17, 1887, Looney married Robena Pender, with whom he had four children. He was a Freemason. He died on May 25, 1951, aged 91, in Dallas, and was buried on May 26 or 27, at East Mount Cemetery, in Greenville.
