= Yadkin College, North Carolina =

- Census-designated place (CDP)
- Location within the state of North Carolina
- Coordinates: 35°52′15″N 80°22′10″W
- Country: United States
- State: North Carolina
- County: Davidson

Area
  - Total: 2.96 sq mi (7.66 km^{2})
  - Land: 2.88 sq mi (7.47 km^{2})
  - Water: 0.073 sq mi (0.19 km^{2})
- Elevation: 804 ft (245 m)

Population (2020)
  - Total: 377
  - Density: 131/sq mi (50.5/km^{2})
- Time zone: UTC-5 (Eastern (EST))
  - Summer (DST): UTC-4 (EDT)
- ZIP codes: 27295
- FIPS code: 37-75880
- GNIS feature ID: 2812789

Yadkin College is a census-designated place (CDP) in rural Davidson County, North Carolina, United States, located 9 miles (14 km) northwest of Lexington. Contrary to its name, it is not part of Yadkin County.

Yadkin College is named for the college of the same name that operated there from 1857 to 1895, which was in turn named after the Yadkin River that runs alongside the village.

The Yadkin College Historic District was added to the National Register of Historic Places in 1988.

The latitude of Yadkin College is 35.872N. The longitude is -80.375W. The ZIP code is 27295.

It first appeared as a CDP in the 2020 Census with a population of 377.

== Demographics ==
Historical population
| Census | Pop. | Note | %± |
|---|---|---|---|
| 2020 | 377 | | — |
U.S. Decennial Census; 2020

=== 2020 census ===
Yadkin College CDP, North Carolina – Racial and Ethnic Composition (NH = Non-Hispanic) Note: the US Census treats Hispanic/Latino as an ethnic category. This table excludes Latinos from the racial categories and assigns them to a separate category. Hispanics/Latinos may be of any race.
| Race / Ethnicity | Pop 2020 | % 2020 |
|---|---|---|
| White alone (NH) | 345 | 91.51% |
| Black or African American alone (NH) | 3 | 0.80% |
| Native American or Alaska Native alone (NH) | 0 | 0.00% |
| Asian alone (NH) | 2 | 0.53% |
| Pacific Islander alone (NH) | 0 | 0.00% |
| Some Other Race alone (NH) | 1 | 0.27% |
| Mixed Race/Multi-Racial (NH) | 11 | 2.92% |
| Hispanic or Latino (any race) | 15 | 3.98% |
| Total | 377 | 100.00% |
