= James E. Harrison =

Confederate States Army brigadier general (1815–1875)

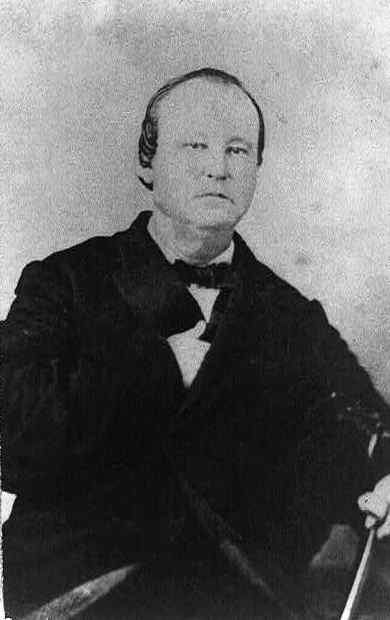
- James Edward Harrison
- Born: April 24, 1815; Greenville District, South Carolina
- Died: February 23, 1875 (aged 59); Waco, Texas
- Burial place: Waco, Texas
- Military career
- Allegiance: Confederate States of America
- Branch: Confederate States Army
- Service years: 1861–1865
- Rank: Brigadier General
- Conflicts: American Civil War

James Edward Harrison (April 24, 1815 – February 23, 1875) was a Confederate States Army brigadier general during the American Civil War. He served in the Trans-Mississippi Department and fought in campaigns in Louisiana. Before the war, he was a two-term Mississippi state senator before moving to Texas in 1857. After the war, he was a trustee of Baylor University.

== Early life ==
James Edward Harrison was born on April 24, 1815, in Greenville District, South Carolina. The Harrison family moved to Alabama and then to Mississippi when Harrison was a boy.

James Harrison served two terms in the Mississippi Senate.

Harrison moved to Texas, near Waco, in 1857. He was a commissioner for the State of Texas in negotiations with Native Americans (Indians). These negotiations were undertaken upon the order of Texas Governor Edward Clark, who replaced the deposed Sam Houston when Houston refused to swear allegiance to the Confederacy. The negotiators tried to persuade the Five Civilized Tribes to join with the Confederacy in the event of war with the United States. The negotiators returned with an optimistic report. Upon his return from the negotiations, Harrison became a member of the Texas secession convention.

== American Civil War ==
James E. Harrison's Confederate States Army service was almost entirely west of the Mississippi River. He began his service with the 15th Texas Infantry Regiment. He was lieutenant colonel of the regiment in May 1862. He participated in the Louisiana campaign of 1863 (First Bayou Teche Campaign) under Brigadier General Thomas Green. He commanded a cavalry brigade in the District of West Louisiana at this time. The 15th Texas Infantry made a successful charge on the Union force's rear in an operation along the Atchafalaya River in September 1863. Harrison also fought in the Second Bayou Teche Campaign.

In 1864, Harrison was promoted to colonel of the 15th Texas Infantry. He participated in the 1864 (Red River Campaign) under Lieutenant General Richard Taylor. He received favorable mention in the reports of the commanders in both Louisiana campaigns.

On January 6, 1865, Harrison was appointed and confirmed as a brigadier general to rank from December 22, 1864, by Confederate President Jefferson Davis.

James Harrison commanded a brigade in the District of Texas, New Mexico and Arizona of the Confederate Trans-Mississippi Department from March to April 7, 1865, in Major General Camille A. J. M. de Polignac's Division and the 1st Brigade, Brigadier General Samuel B Maxey's Division in the same district from April 7, 1865, through May 26, 1865.

== Aftermath ==
Harrison was a prominent member of the Waco, Texas community after the Civil War. He was active in education and served as a trustee of Baylor University.

== Family ==
James Edward Harrison was the son of Isham Harrison (November 4, 1788 Greenville County, South Carolina - September 30, 1863) and Harriet Kelly (February 11, 1789, Greenville County, South Carolina - July 1, 1856 Aberdeen, Mississippi). He was a brother of Confederate Brigadier General Thomas Harrison and a second cousin of Wade Hampton III.

James Edward Harrison died February 23, 1875, in Waco, Texas, and is buried in First Street Cemetery in Waco.

== See also ==
List of American Civil War generals (Confederate)
