= Yadkin College =

Former college in North Carolina, US

- Active: 1857–1924
- Location: Yadkin College, Davidson County, North Carolina, United States; 35°52′19″N 80°22′30″W

Yadkin College was a college founded in 1857 by the Methodist Protestant Church. It was located in rural Davidson County, North Carolina and named for the nearby Yadkin River. High Point University serves as the successor to Yadkin College.

The founders hoped the rural setting would prevent the "sinfulness" often displayed by college students. The location proved the college's undoing, however – in 1883 the college became an academy, or prep school and operated in that capacity until sometime in the 1890s when for a few years it achieved junior college status. In 1898 it again became a high school, renamed the Yadkin Collegiate Institute. The rise of public high schools after the turn of the 20th century led to the closing of the Institute in 1924.

The unincorporated village of Yadkin College still exists near the ruins of the institution. Its former buildings are included in the Yadkin College Historic District, listed on the National Register of Historic Places in 1984.
