= Frank I. Osborne =

American politician

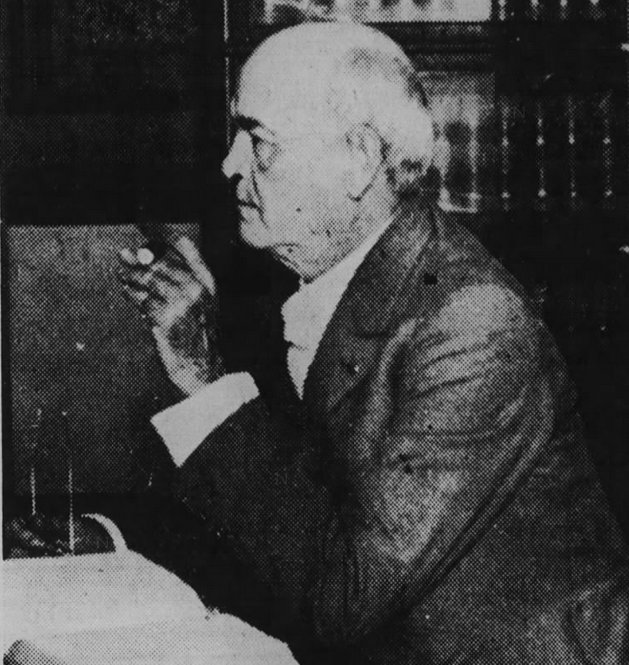

Member of the North Carolina Senate
- In office 1898–1899
- Constituency: Mecklenburg County

North Carolina Attorney General
- In office 1893–1897
- Governor: Elias Carr
- Preceded by: Theodore F. Davidson
- Succeeded by: Zeb V. Walser

Mayor of Charlotte, North Carolina
- In office 1879–1881

Personal details
- Born: Francis Irwin Osborne; May 28, 1853 Charlotte, North Carolina
- Died: January 20, 1920 (aged 66) Charlotte, North Carolina
- Party: Democratic
- Education: Davidson College
- Occupation: Judge, politician

Francis Irwin Osborne (May 28, 1853 – January 20, 1920) was the Attorney General of North Carolina from 1893 to 1896.

== Biography ==
Francis Osborne was born in Charlotte, North Carolina on May 28, 1853. He attended Davidson College before reading law for 2 years in the offices of Richmond Mumford Pearson, Chief Justice of the North Carolina Supreme Court. Osborne was admitted to the North Carolina Bar in 1875. At age 25, he was elected mayor of the city of Charlotte. He was elected Attorney General of North Carolina in 1893, but, defeated for reelection to the same office in 1896. Osborne served a term as a State Senator from Mecklenburg County, North Carolina in the North Carolina General Assembly from 1898 to 1899. He served on 9 standing Senate Committees. After 1899, Osborne resumed his legal practice at the law firm of Osborne, Maxwell & Kearn. Though, himself, a Democrat, in 1901 Osborne defended both North Carolina Supreme Court Chief Justice David M. Furches and North Carolina Supreme Court Associate Justice Robert Martin Douglas during their impeachment hearings. Osborne was of the opinion that the Republican judges' impeachments were unwarranted and an attempted political purge. Osborne's brilliant speech before the North Carolina General Assembly in closing defense of the justices caused both to be acquitted. As reward for his successful defense of the justices, Theodore Roosevelt upon assuming office as President of the United States appointed Osborne a judge of the United States Court of Private Land Claims, on which he served from 1901 to 1904.

Francis Osborne died at his home in Charlotte on January 20, 1920.

Party political offices
| Preceded by Theodore F. Davidson | Democratic nominee for Attorney General of North Carolina; 1892, 1896 | Succeeded by Robert D. Gilmer |
Legal offices
| Preceded by Theodore F. Davidson | Attorney General of North Carolina; 1893 – 1897 | Succeeded by Zeb V. Walser |
