= Robert M. Douglas (judge) =

American judge (1849–1917)

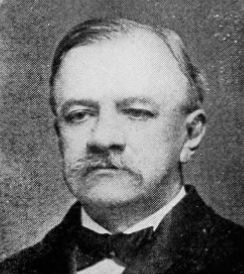

Justice of the North Carolina Supreme Court
- In office 1897–1905

Private Secretary to the President
- In office 1869–1873
- President: Ulysses S. Grant
- Preceded by: Robert Johnson
- Succeeded by: Levi P. Lucke

Personal details
- Born: January 28, 1849 Rockingham County, North Carolina, U.S.
- Died: February 8, 1917 (aged 68) Greensboro, North Carolina, U.S.
- Party: Republican
- Other political affiliations: Democratic
- Spouse: Jessie Madeline Dick (m. 1874)
- Children: Madeline; Robert; Stephen; Martin
- Parent(s): Stephen A. Douglas; Martha Martin
- Education: Loyola College; Georgetown College
- Occupation: Jurist, politician

Robert Martin Douglas (January 28, 1849 – February 8, 1917) was a North Carolina Supreme Court justice and political figure. At the beginning of his career, the young attorney served as private secretary to the Republican governor of North Carolina, and secretary to President Ulysses S. Grant.

== Early life and education ==
Born on January 28, 1849, at his maternal grandmother's home in Rockingham County, North Carolina, he was the first of two sons of Senator Stephen A. Douglas (Democrat of Illinois) and Martha Martin, originally of North Carolina. Martha died after the birth of her third child, a daughter, in 1853, and the unnamed infant died a few weeks later. Robert was only four. He and his brother Stephen spent considerable time when young with their maternal grandmother and the Martin family in their mother's home state. After his father married Adele Cutts, from a Maryland Catholic family, she had the boys baptized and reared them as Catholic with his permission.

The family split their time between homes in Washington, D.C. and Chicago, Illinois during his father's Senate service. Douglas attended Loyola College in Baltimore, Maryland, and graduated from Georgetown College in Washington, D.C. in 1867. He later earned a Master's degree and a doctoral degree in law from the same institution.

== Career ==
In the aftermath of the American Civil War, Douglas turned away from the Democratic Party to which his father had belonged. He believed that the party had died during the war. He became a leading Republican and active in Reconstruction era governments. In 1868, Douglas served as private secretary to the Governor of North Carolina. From 1869 to 1873, he was appointed private secretary to President Ulysses S. Grant.

For the next decade, he served as United States Marshal for North Carolina. In 1888 he was appointed to serve as Master in Chancery to the United States Circuit Court. He continued until 1896, when he was elected as associate justice of the North Carolina Supreme Court.

In 1901, Justice Douglas and Chief Justice David M. Furches (also a Republican) were impeached by the Democratic Party-controlled North Carolina House of Representatives "for issuing an allegedly unconstitutional mandamus ordering the State Treasurer to pay out money." Neither was removed from office by the necessary two-thirds vote of the North Carolina Senate, although a simple majority of senators favored removal. Douglas served his eight-year term and then retired from the court. A principal contributor to the building of St. Agnes Church in Greensboro, Douglas authored the article on "North Carolina" for the Catholic Encyclopedia.

Douglas died at his home in Greensboro, North Carolina, on February 8, 1917.

== Marriage and family ==
On June 23, 1874, Douglas married Jessie Madeline Dick, daughter of the Honorable Robert Paine Dick, a Supreme Court justice of North Carolina. They had four children together:

- Madeleine Douglas (who later married Col. Edward Warren Myers)
- Robert Dick Douglas (1875–1960)
- Stephen Arnold Douglas (born 1879)
- Martin F. Douglas (born 1886)
