= Southwestern University =

Private college in Georgetown, Texas, US

Coordinates: 30.63600°N 97.66480°W

- Former name: List: Rutersville College (1840–1856); McKenzie College (1841–1868); Soule University (1856–1887); Wesleyan College (1844–1847); Texas University (1870–1875)
- Motto: Non Quis Sed Quid (Latin)
- Motto in English: "Not Who But What"
- Type: Private liberal arts university
- Established: February 5, 1840; 186 years ago
- Accreditation: SACS
- Religious affiliation: Methodist
- Academic affiliations: ACS; Annapolis Group; CIC; IAMSCU; NAICU
- Endowment: $403.6 million (2024)
- President: Laura Skandera Trombley
- Dean: Alisa Gaunder
- Faculty: 386
- Administrative staff: 317
- Undergraduates: 1,515
- Location: Georgetown, Texas, United States
- Campus: 700 acres (2.8 km^{2}); Small city
- Newspaper: The Megaphone
- Colors: Black and gold
- Nickname: Pirates
- Sporting affiliations: NCAA Division III – SCAC; SAA
- Mascot: The Captain
- Website: southwestern.edu
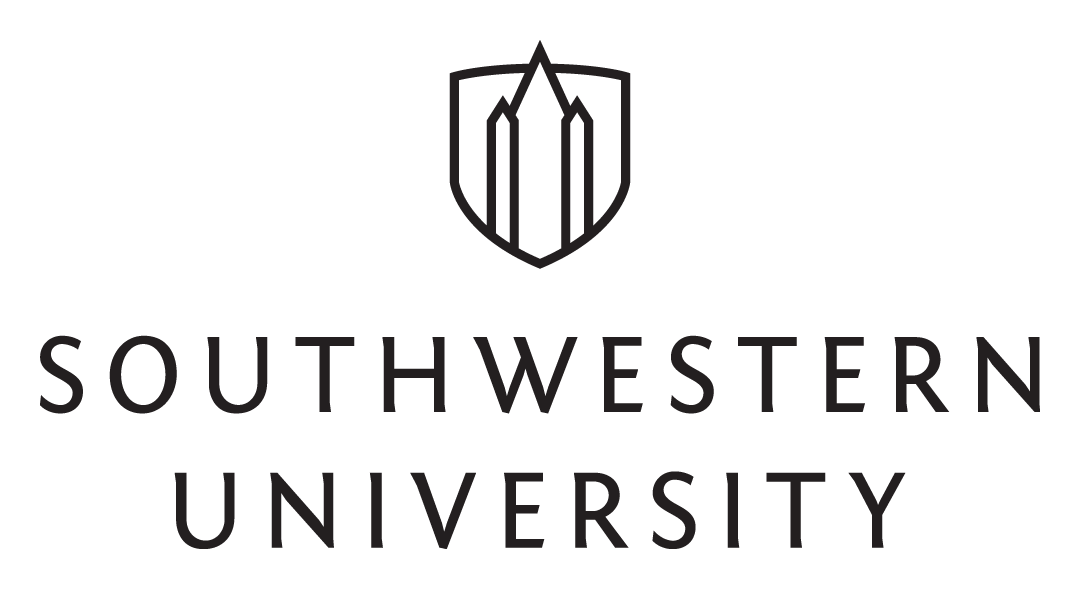

Southwestern University (Southwestern or SU) is a private liberal arts university located in Georgetown, Texas. Established in 1840, it holds the distinction of being both the oldest college or university in Texas, and having maintained continuous, unbroken operation since its founding. While the institution evolved through a 1873 union of four earlier colleges, it remains the state's oldest academic lineage. This uninterrupted history, originating with the chartering of Rutersville College, also establishes Southwestern as the oldest continually operating university in Texas.

Southwestern offers 40 bachelor's degrees in the arts, sciences, fine arts, and music as well as interdisciplinary and pre-professional programs. It is accredited by the Southern Association of Colleges and Schools and the National Association of Schools of Music and historically affiliated with the United Methodist Church.

== History ==
Prior to assuming its current form, charters had been granted by the Texas Legislature (Texas Congress 1836–1845) to establish four educational institutions: Rutersville College, "Wesleyan College" McKenzie College and Soule University.

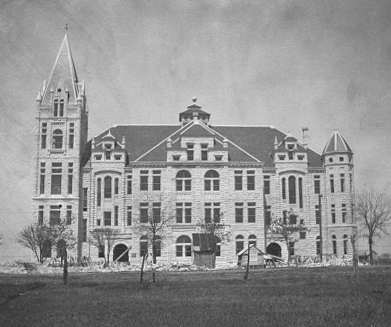
The Roy and Lillie Cullen Building shortly after completion

Students in front of Mood-Bridwell Hall in 1910

In 1870, a charter was granted to a new institution, known as "Texas University", that would be a union of these four previously-independent institutions. This new university would open its doors in Georgetown three years later in 1873. Intending to reserve that name for a proposed state university in Austin, the University of Texas, the Texas Legislature instead granted a charter in 1875 under the name "Southwestern University" as a continuation of the charters for Rutersville, Wesleyan, McKenzie, and Soule. The institution considers its founding date to be 1840 when Rutersville College opened.

Southwestern was a charter member of the Southwest Conference in 1915. Southern Methodist University was Southwestern's main rival for several decades in remembrance of an unsuccessful attempt to relocate Southwestern to Dallas which instead resulted in the establishment of SMU. When SMU's student population became much larger, students at Southwestern began considering Trinity University and Austin College to be the school's main rivals. After World War II, Southwestern became a small liberal arts institution, discontinuing its post-graduate degrees, disbanding the football team, and rebuilding much of the campus with a massive capital campaign. The endowment rose substantially.

Until 1965, no African-Americans were allowed to attend the institution. In 1965, Ernest Clark enrolled; he graduated in 1969.

Former president Edward B. Burger stepped down in 2020 and assumed the role of president and CEO of St. David's Foundation. Laura Skandera Trombley succeeded him as president.

== Academics ==
The institution offers 40 majors and 36 minors divided between the Brown College of Arts, Garey School of Natural Sciences, and the Sarofim School of Fine Arts.

In the 2013–2014 academic year, total student enrollment was at 1,536, with a gender distribution of about 60 percent female and 40 percent male. Of the entering first-year students in Fall 2013, 37 percent were in the top 10 percent of their high school graduating class with an average SAT score of 1166 (writing section not included). The majority of students come from Texas (89 percent); the remaining 11 percent come from 23 other states and 6 countries. Minority students constitute 33 percent of the student body.

The student to faculty ratio is 11:1, with an average class size of 15 students. Ninety-nine percent of the tenured or tenure-track faculty hold a doctorate or highest degree in their fields.

=== Rankings and reputation ===
In its 2024-2025 edition, US News and World Report ranked Southwestern University tied at 83rd out of 211 National Liberal Arts Colleges. Forbes ranked Southwestern University 284th out of the top 500 rated private and public colleges and universities in America for the 2024-25 report. Southwestern University was also ranked 151st among private universities and 67th in the south.

Academic rankings

Liberal arts
- U.S. News & World Report: 83
- Washington Monthly: 35

National
- Forbes: 284

== Campus ==
Southwestern University is located in Georgetown, Texas, about 30 miles (50 km) north of Austin. The campus comprises 700 acres (2.8 km²) mostly located north of University Avenue, although the eastern portion of these lands remains largely undeveloped. The main campus is organized around a central academic mall formed by a semi-circular grassy area bounded by a pedestrian walkway and academic buildings. Residence halls and on-campus apartments are located to the east and northwest of the academic mall. Sports fields, support facilities, and parking are on the periphery of the main campus.

=== Notable buildings ===
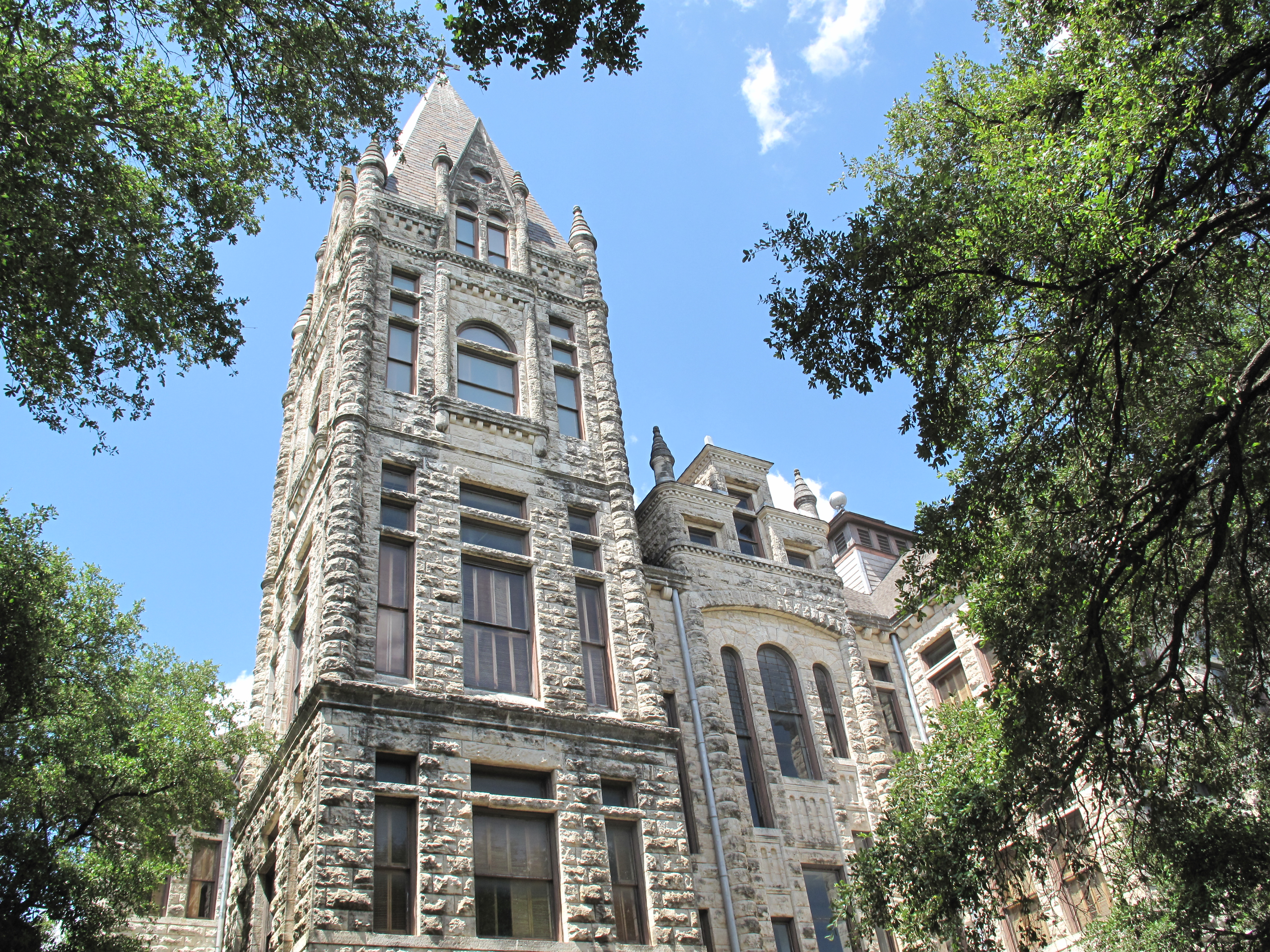
The Hugh Roy and Lillie Cullen Building in 2009

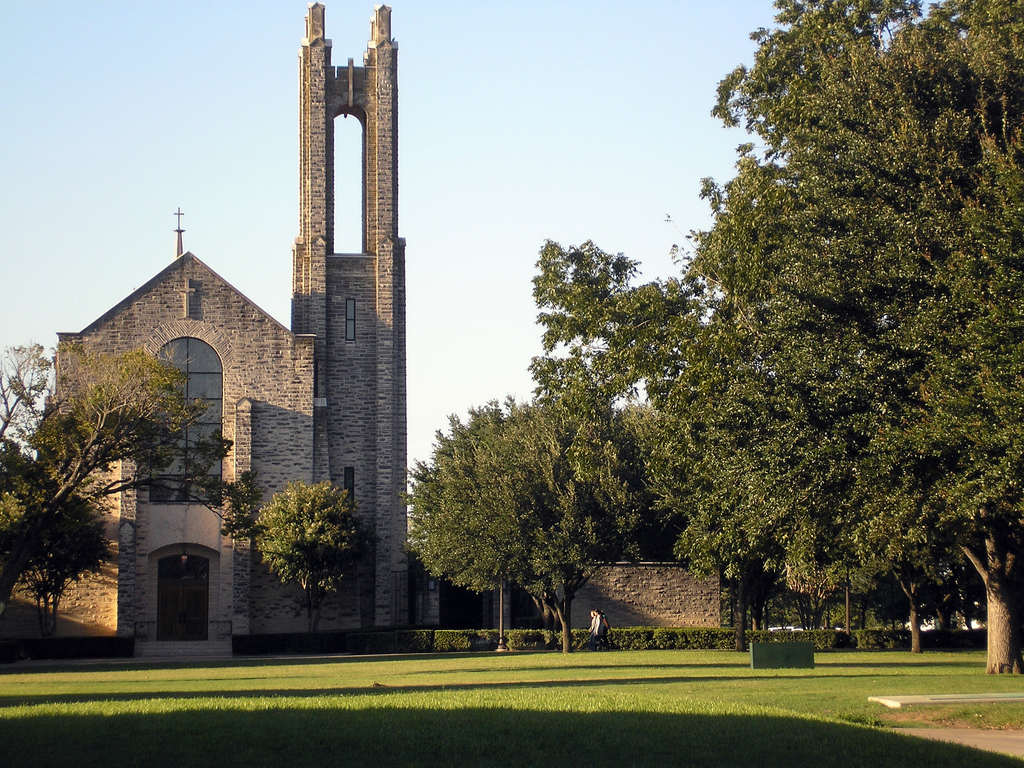
The Lois Perkins Chapel situated along the Academic Mall

The Hugh Roy and Lillie Cullen Building (formerly called the Administration Building) was built in 1898 in the Richardsonian Romanesque style and is listed on the National Register of Historic Places. It is named in honor of Hugh Roy Cullen and his wife.

Mood-Bridwell Hall, originally a men's dormitory, was completed in 1908 and currently houses classrooms, faculty offices, a computer lab, the Debbie Ellis Writing Center, and an indoor atrium. Mood-Bridwell is included in the Cullen Building's listing on the National Register of Historic Places.

The Lois Perkins Chapel was built in 1950 and includes an Aeolian-Skinner pipe organ. Stained glass windows along the east and west sides depict Reformation leaders and Methodist leaders with seals for the educational institutions they were affiliated with.

The Fayez Sarofim School of Fine Arts is housed in the Alma Thomas Fine Arts Building, originally built in 1956 on the former property of the Texas rancher Dudley Hiram Snyder, a Southwestern University benefactor. The Fine Arts Building (FAB) has been renovated multiple times, most recently in 1998 and 2008. The FAB houses the 700-seat Alma Thomas Theater, the smaller Jones Theater, the Caldwell-Carvey Foyer, numerous practice rooms, art studios, a black box theater, and an instrumental rehearsal hall.

== Student activities and organizations ==
There are over 90 student organizations on campus.

=== Greek life ===
Southwestern hosts a number of national social fraternities and sororities.

=== Media ===
The Megaphone, established in 1907, is the official student newspaper. It is available online, and also published biweekly in print.

Spyglass Literary Magazine is the student literary magazine. The magazine is the oldest publication on campus, established in 1882 as the Alamo and San Jacinto Monthly and renamed the Southwestern University Monthly in 1895, then the SU Literary Magazine, and finally The Spyglass in 2012.

SU Radio is an online radio station.

== Athletics ==
Southwestern athletics wordmark

Southwestern is a member of the NCAA Division III Southern Athletic Association (SAA) since 2025 after leaving the Southern Collegiate Athletic Conference (SCAC). Southwestern competes in 20 varsity sports, including football, basketball, cross country, track & field, golf, soccer, swimming & diving, tennis, lacrosse, men's baseball, women's volleyball and women's softball. Intramural sports on campus include handball, rock climbing, and ultimate frisbee. The school mascot is the pirate.

The men's lacrosse team became a varsity sport in 2009 after offering lacrosse as a club sport for 25 years. The men's lacrosse team won the Lonestar Alliance Division II Championship for four consecutive years prior to becoming a varsity sport. The women's team is currently non-varsity and is affiliated with the Texas Women's Lacrosse League, although the institution plans to field a varsity team in 2014. The women's team won a division championships in 2007.

In addition to lacrosse, Southwestern has a nationally ranked handball team that won the Division II National Collegiate Championship in 2007. In September 2016, Southwestern's volleyball team moved up to 3rd place in the AVCA coaches poll as well.

Southwestern reinstated football in 2013 after a 62-year hiatus. The institution previously fielded football teams from 1908 to 1951, reaching national prominence during World War II when the institution's participation in the Navy's V-12 College Training Program enlisted talented players from other schools. Southwestern was a founding member of the Southwest Conference and won the Sun Bowl in 1944 and 1945.

== See also ==
- National Register of Historic Places listings in Williamson County, Texas
