= Cullen Park =

Park in Houston, Texas

Coordinates: 29°47′55″N 95°41′36″W

Cullen Park is a large public park in west Houston, Texas, located at 19008 Saums Road in the Energy Corridor area. It occupies land within or adjacent to the Addicks Reservoir, managed under a long-term lease by the City of Houston from the U.S. Army Corps of Engineers.

== History ==
In February 1979, the City of Houston and the U.S. Army Corps of Engineers began planning to transform portions of the roughly 11,500-acre Addicks Reservoir area into recreational space that became Cullen Park.

The Cullen Foundation, established by philanthropist Hugh Roy Cullen and his wife Lillie, committed significant funding; reports vary between $6 million and $10 million, to develop the park, with the City providing matching funds.

The West Houston Association played a key advocacy role, helping to ensure the donation was used promptly by urging the City to start construction before the funds could revert.

Cullen Park celebrated its groundbreaking in 1983, with participation from Mayor Kathy Whitmire, the Houston Parks Board, and West Houston Association board members.

Phase I, Community Park East, opened around that time or shortly after and was completed in 1986, adding facilities such as the Alkek Velodrome, a four-field baseball complex, four soccer fields, and picnic/playground areas. Phase II, Community Park West, improvements were completed in 1989, adding more picnic facilities, restrooms, shelters, playgrounds, and trails.

The park is named in honor of Hugh Roy Cullen, a prominent Houston oilman and philanthropist whose foundation has supported numerous civic and educational projects in the city.

Today, much of the park remains in a natural state with woodlands, wetlands, meadows, and trails, while developed areas support active recreation.
