= Mood-Bridwell Hall =

Building in Georgetown, Texas, U.S.

- Southwestern University Administration Building and Mood Hall
- U.S. National Register of Historic Places
- Students in front of Mood Hall in 1910

- Location within Texas Location within the United States
- Location: 1001 E. University Ave., Georgetown, Texas
- Coordinates: 30°38′05″N 97°40′00″W
- Area: 2 acres (0.81 ha)
- Built: 1906
- NRHP reference No.: 75002013
- Added to NRHP: April 23, 1975

Mood-Bridwell Hall is a building on the Southwestern University campus in Georgetown, Texas, United States. It was listed on the National Register of Historic Places in 1975, along with the neighboring Hugh Roy and Lillie Cullen Building.

== History ==
Mood Hall (named for university President Francis Asbury Mood) was built as a student dormitory, with construction beginning in 1906 and completed in 1908. The hall served as a barracks for students in the Student Army Training Corps during World War I, and again for the V-12 Navy College Training Program during World War II. Since 1965, the hall has held offices for faculty and campus organizations rather than student residences.

Together with the Hugh Roy and Lillie Cullen Building, Mood-Bridwell Hall was added to the National Register of Historic Places on April 23, 1975 in recognition of its architectural and historical significance.

== See also ==
- National Register of Historic Places listings in Williamson County, Texas
