= Hugh Roy and Lillie Cullen Building =

Historic structure in Georgetown, Texas

- Southwestern University Administration Building and Mood Hall
- U.S. National Register of Historic Places
- Recorded Texas Historic Landmark
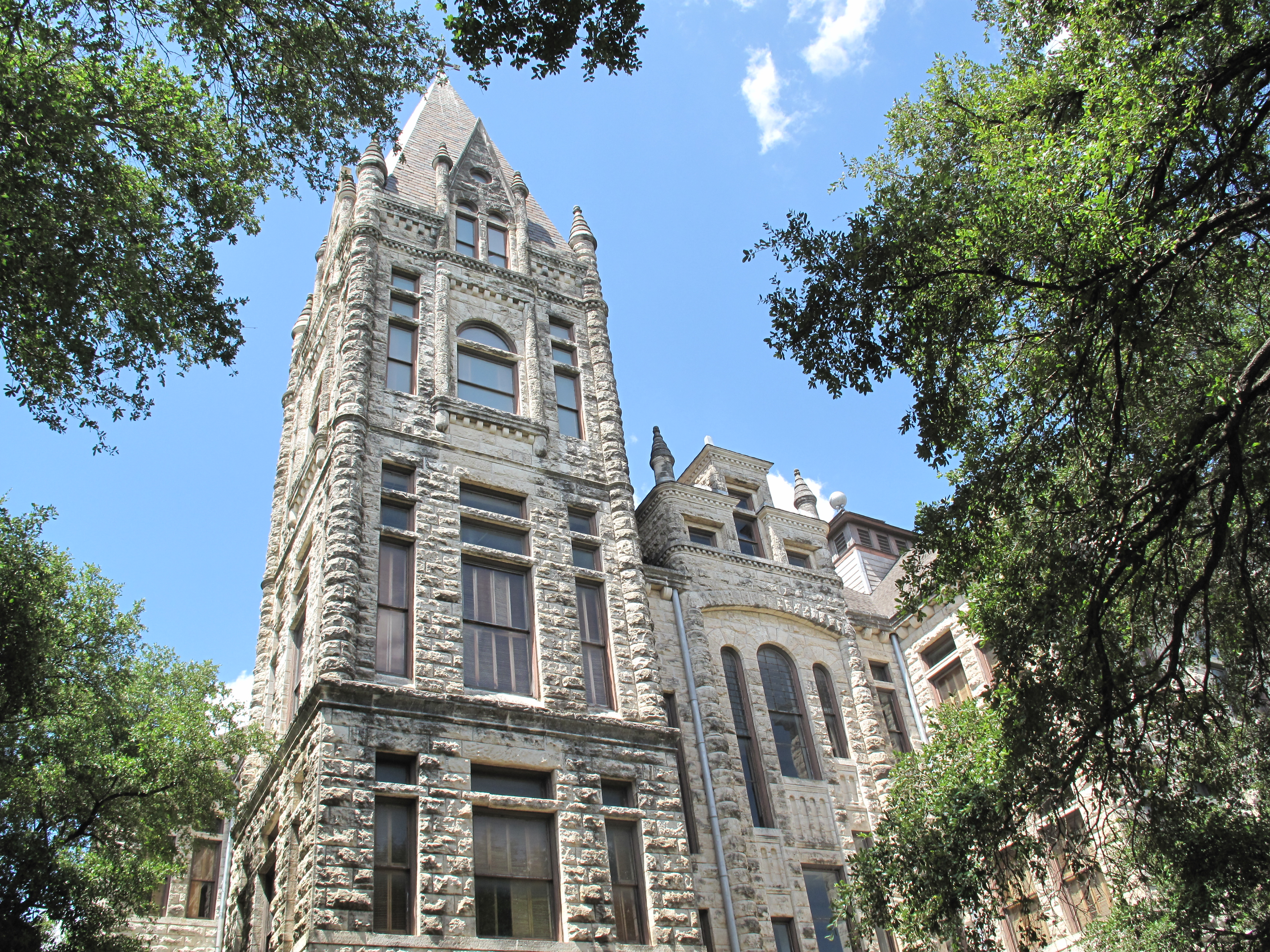
- Southwest view of the Cullen Building tower

- Location within Texas Location within the United States
- Interactive map showing the location for Hugh Roy and Lillie Cullen Building
- Location: 1001 E. University Ave., Georgetown, Texas
- Coordinates: 30°38′0″N 97°40′1″W
- Area: 2 acres (0.81 ha)
- Built: 1900
- Architect: Robert S. Hyer
- Architectural style: Romanesque, Richardsonian Romanesque
- NRHP reference No.: 75002013
- RTHL No.: 9342

Significant dates
- Added to NRHP: April 23, 1975
- Designated RTHL: 1962

The Hugh Roy and Lillie Cullen Building (formerly the Administration Building) is the central administration building of Southwestern University in Georgetown, Texas. Completed in 1900, the Cullen Building was declared a Recorded Texas Historic Landmark in 1962 and has been listed on the National Register of Historic Places since 1975, together with neighboring Mood-Bridwell Hall.

== History ==
Southwestern University was formed in 1873 through the union of four earlier colleges and universities across Texas. By the 1890s the program had grown significantly, and between 1895 and 1897 the university made plans to build a permanent administration building at the entrance to the school's Georgetown, Texas campus. The building was meant to house the university's administrative offices, as well as holding a chapel, a library, and classrooms.

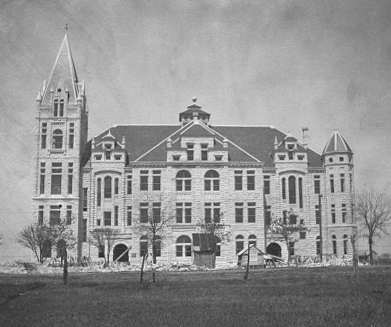
The Administration Building shortly after its construction, c.1900, viewed from the south

The structure was initially designed by Southwestern professor Robert Stewart Hyer (a physicist, not an architect), who was inspired by the works of H. H. Richardson. Architects Layton & Raymond of Oklahoma refined the design, and the building's construction was overseen by Hyer, who had become the university's president by the time construction began. Work on the building began with the laying of its cornerstone on September 8, 1898. Shortages of funding delayed construction during 1899, but Southwestern's Administration Building was completed on April 23, 1900 and used for classes that autumn.

Mood-Bridwell Hall (named for university President Francis Asbury Mood) was subsequently built nearby as a student dormitory, with construction beginning in 1906 and completed in 1908. The hall served as a barracks for students in the Student Army Training Corps during World War I, and again for the V-12 Navy College Training Program during World War II. Since 1965, the hall has held offices for faculty and campus organizations rather than student residences.

The Administration Building was declared a Recorded Texas Historic Landmark in 1962. Together with Mood Hall, it was added to the National Register of Historic Places on April 23, 1975 in recognition of its architectural and historical significance.

=== Renovations ===
The Administration Building underwent a substantial renovation in 1976–7, which included modernization of the structure's climate control and safety features. The work was paid for by a grant from the Cullen Foundation of Houston (named for industrialist Hugh Roy Cullen), in recognition of which the structure was renamed the Hugh Roy and Lillie Cullen Building at its rededication ceremony on October 14, 1977. Further renovations in 2002 and 2011 repaired and replaced windows, improved the building's elevator, and made further mechanical, electrical and climate-control upgrades.

== Architecture ==
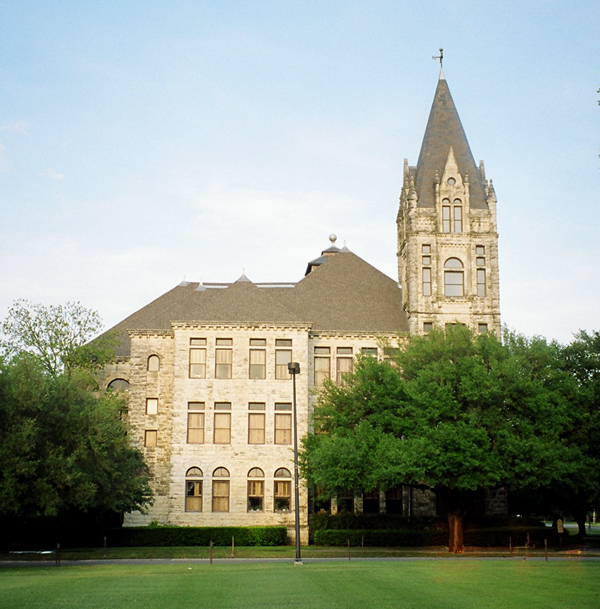
The Cullen Building viewed from the west

The Cullen Building is a roughly rectangular three-story hall, clad with local white limestone on its facade, with a large square tower projecting several stories higher from the southwest corner, and a smaller round tower on the southeast corner. The building is designed in a Richardsonian Romanesque style, with rusticated stonework, cylindrical buttresses with conical caps, and round-headed Romanesque arches mixed with rectangular transom windows. The exterior walls are made of hand-laid 18-inch (46 cm) limestone, laid by builders Flume & Waterston, who had also previously done stonework for the Texas State Capitol. As additional buildings have been added to Southwestern's campus, the Cullen Building's architectural style has served as the standard for their design.

The main entrances are in the south facade, formed as a pair of massive stone arches set symmetrically to the sides of the central mass of the hall. The doorways and windows penetrating the limestone facade are topped with a mixture of round arches (especially on the ground floor) and transom windows. A ring of dentils surrounds the building above the third story at the roofline; above, a gray hipped roof is surmounted by a cupola.

=== Tower ===
One of the Cullen Building's most prominent features is its tower, which reaches up from the hall's southwest corner to form a spire overlooking the campus. The tower has a square cross-section, and protrudes slightly from the corner of the hall. Its south and west faces are penetrated by three columns of rectangular windows from the second story to the fourth; those on the second floor are topped by transom windows, while those on the third and fourth are topped by two transom windows each. The third- and fourth-story corners bear small cylindrical bartizans which terminate in conical pinnacles. Steep gabled dormers penetrate the roofline above the fourth level, framed by additional pinnacles.

The tower's interior is accessed from a third-story office by a spiral staircase, which leads up into a fourth-story room that fills the tower. Separate from the main body of the Cullen Building and windowed on all four sides, this chamber affords an elevated view of the campus and of surrounding Georgetown.

== See also ==
- National Register of Historic Places listings in Williamson County, Texas
- Recorded Texas Historic Landmarks in Williamson County
