= Round Rock Commercial Historic District =

Historic district in Round Rock, Texas, U.S.

- U.S. National Register of Historic Places
- U.S. Historic district
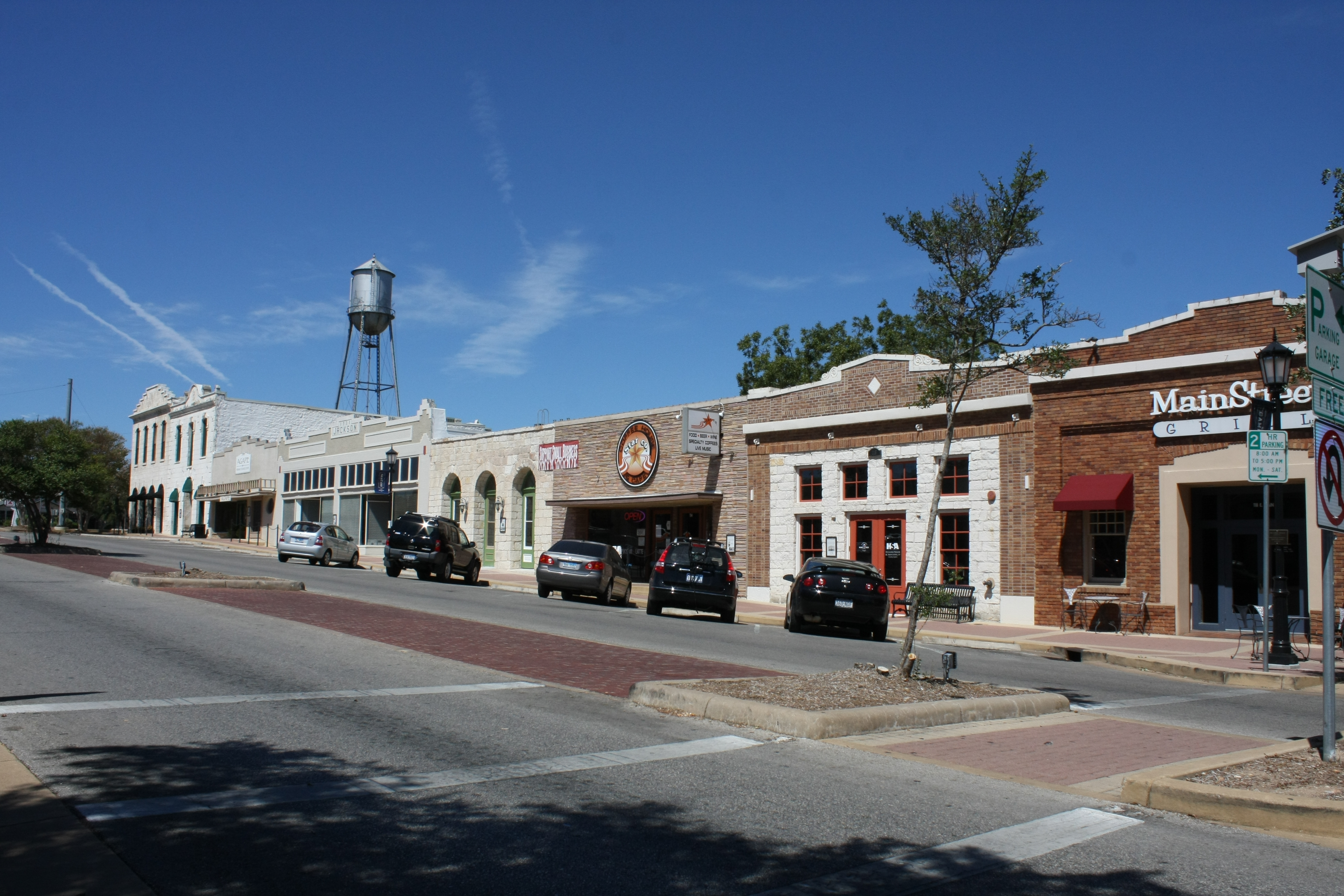
- Some of the district's structures in 2012

- Location within Texas
- Location: 100 and 200 blks E. Main St., Round Rock, Texas
- Coordinates: 30.5083°N 97.6775°W
- Area: 4.2 acres (1.7 ha)
- Built: 1870
- Architectural style: Italianate
- NRHP reference No.: 83003170
- Added to NRHP: June 9, 1983

The Round Rock Commercial Historic District is an historic district in Round Rock, Texas, listed on the National Register of Historic Places.

== Description ==
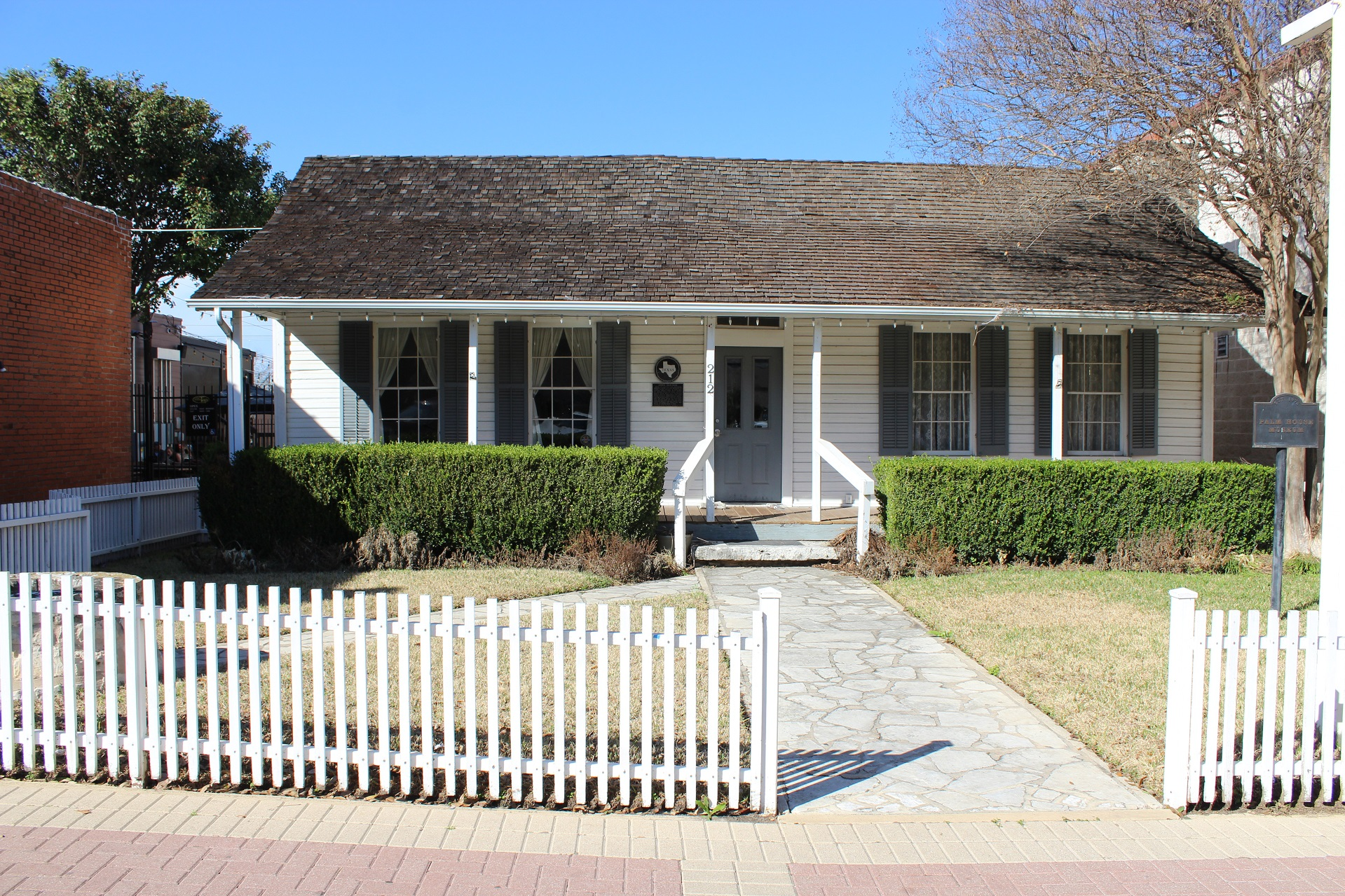
Exterior of the Andrew J. Palm House in 2017

The district has 22 contributing structures, including:

- 100 East Main Street (1880): Shuey's Furniture Store; Old Broom Factory, a two-story limestone building
- 101 East Main Street (1876): Kopperal's General Store (Fabric Designs), a one-story, stone-masonry building. In 1972 Robertson's Fabrics operated out of this building. From at least 1957 to 1970 Round Rock Donuts operated out of this building
- 102 East Main Street (1879): Otto Reinke Building (Round Rock Travel and Tours, and Round Rock Leader), a two-story building
- 103 East Main Street (1876): Miller's Exchange Bank (Earl's Brushy Creek Gallery), a one-story, stone-masonry building
- 104 East Main Street (1947): Round Rock Insurance and John's Barber Shop
- 105 East Main Street (1876): Sam Bass General Store, a one-story building
- 109 East Main Street (1885): Maschall and McNeary, Attorneys, a one-story, stone-masonry building
- 111 East Main Street (1916–1925): Round Rock Printing, a brick building
- 112 East Main Street (1881)
- 114 East Main Street (1881): Bo-Kay Florist
- 115 East Main Street (1885): Gus's Drug Store, a one-story, stone-masonry building
- 116 East Main Street (1880): Round Rock Professional Building
- 117 East Main Street (1891): The Fair, a one-story, stone-masonry building
- 118 East Main Street (1880): First National Bank
- 118 East Main Street (1880): First National Bank
- 119 East Main Street (1881): Robertson's Gift Shop, a one-story, stone-masonry building
- 121 East Main Street (1877): Voight and Brady Grocery; also, W.J. Walsh General Merchandise (Kelly's Cleaners)
- 200 East Main Street (1902–1909): Anderson-Nelson Company (Photocopy & Mike Faulk and Associates, Architects)
- 203 East Main Street (1900): Nelson Hardware; "The Co-op", a two-story limestone building
- 204 East Main Street (1902–1909): Economy Drug Store (Quick Pharmacy)
- 206 East Main Street (1930s): Dr. Gregg's Office
- 208 East Main Street (1873): Andrew J. Palm House (Round Rock Chamber of Commerce)
- 107 South Mays Street (1878): Old Post Office Building (Masonic Lodge #227), a two-story building

Additionally, there are three non-contributing properties:

- 108 and 110 East Main Street (1880)
- 113 East Main Street (c. 1920): Round Rock of Music

== See also ==
- National Register of Historic Places listings in Williamson County, Texas
