= Hutto Commercial Historic District =

Historic district in Texas, United States

- U.S. National Register of Historic Places
- U.S. Historic district
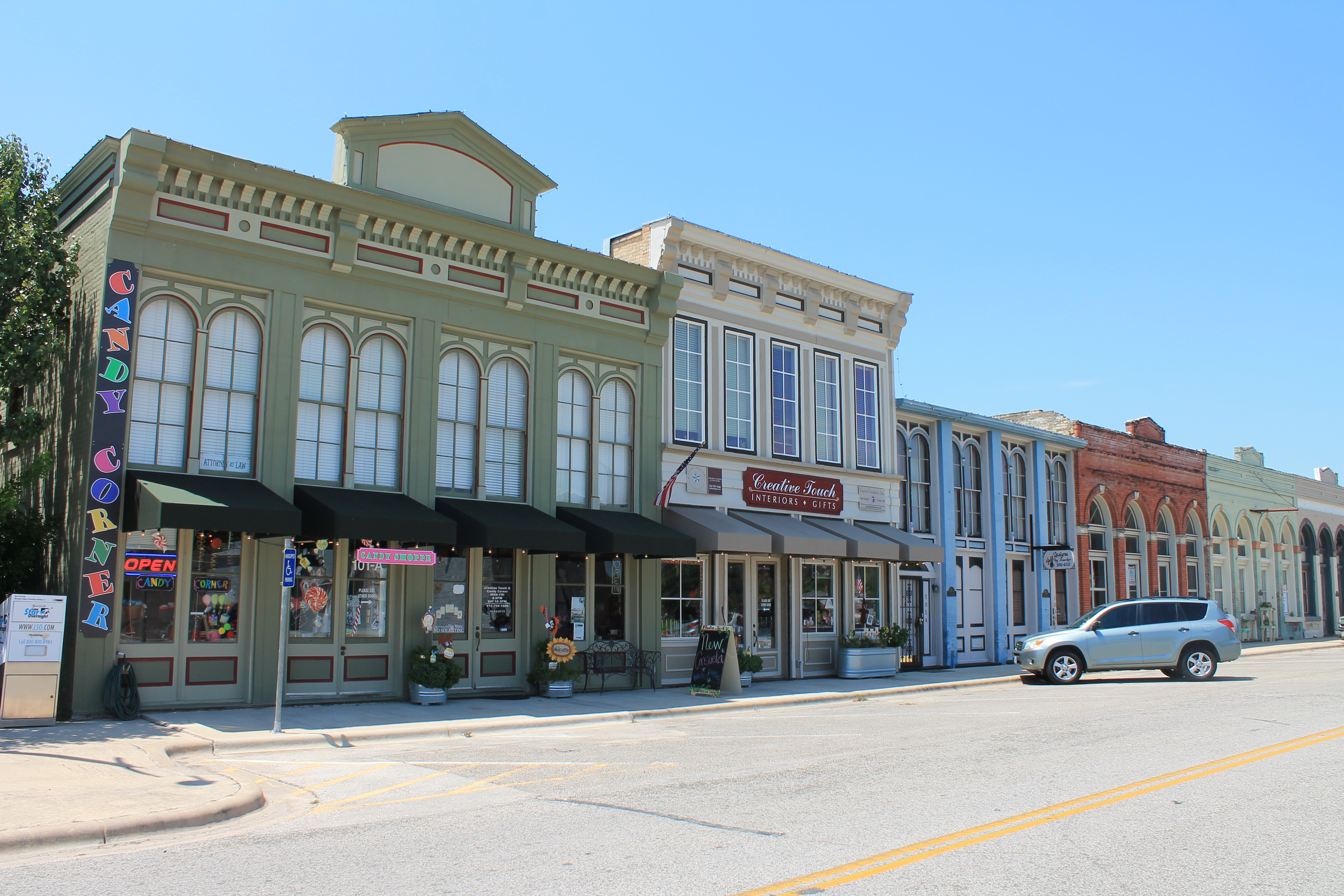
- 100 block East St. in 2012

- Location within Texas Location within the United States
- Location: 101-205 East St., 202 FArley St. & 204 US 79, Hutto, Texas
- Coordinates: 30°37′48″N 97°40′39″W
- Area: 1.2 acres (0.49 ha)
- Built: 1882
- Built by: H.L. Breneman
- Architectural style: Italianate, 1 & 2 Part Commercial Block
- NRHP reference No.: 11000515
- Added to NRHP: August 4, 2011

Hutto Commercial Historic District is a historic district listed on the National Register of Historic Places in Hutto, Texas.

== Photo gallery ==
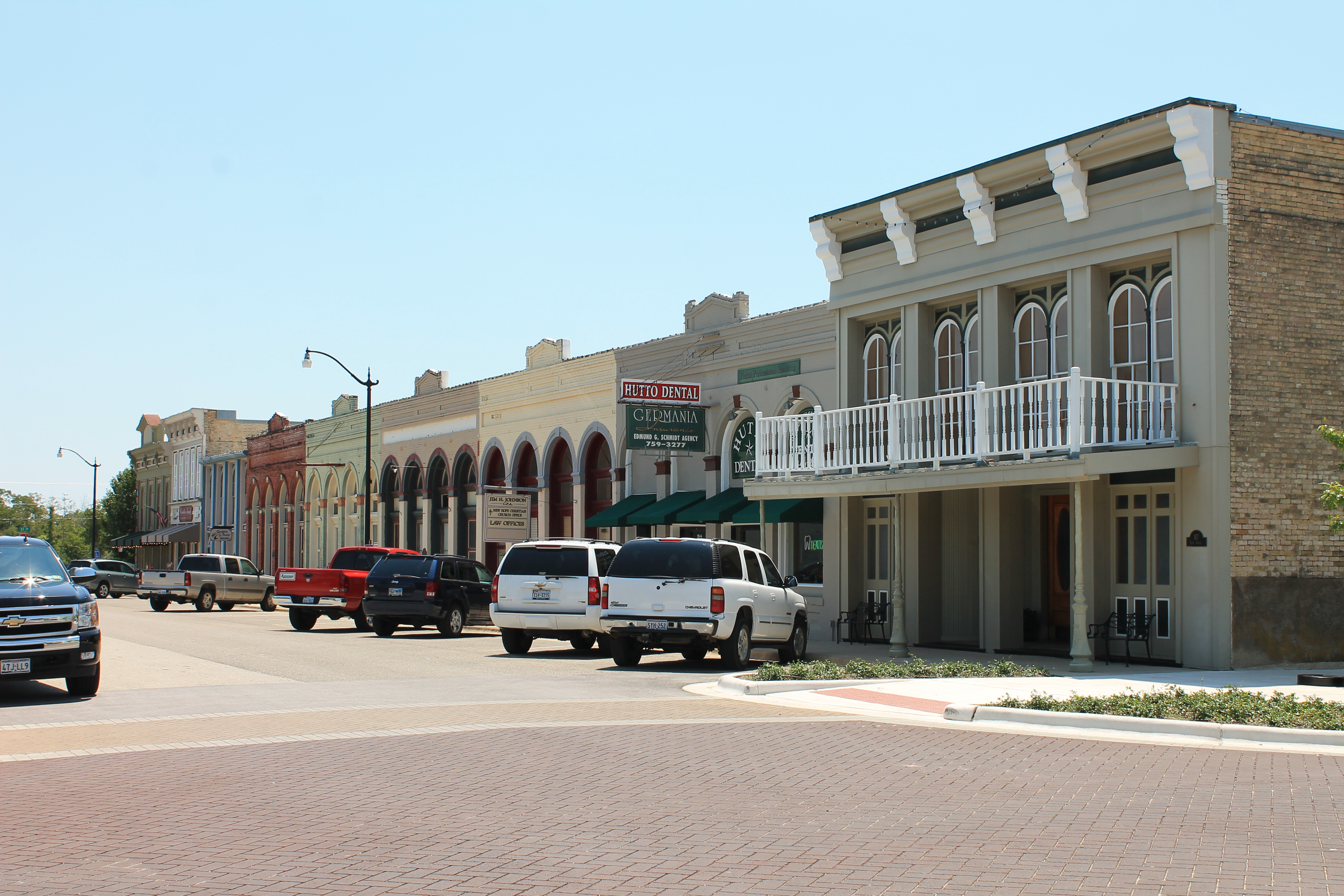

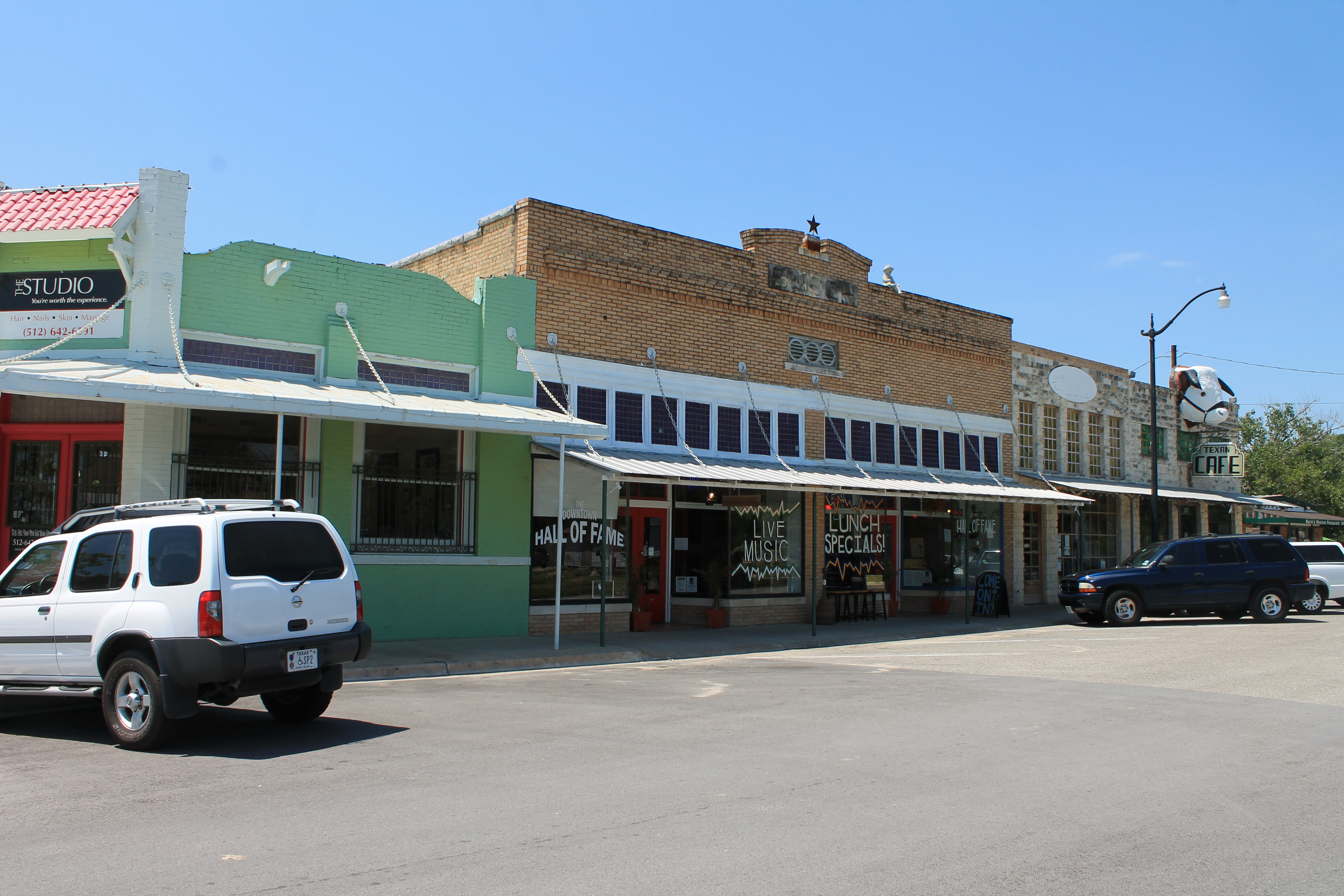

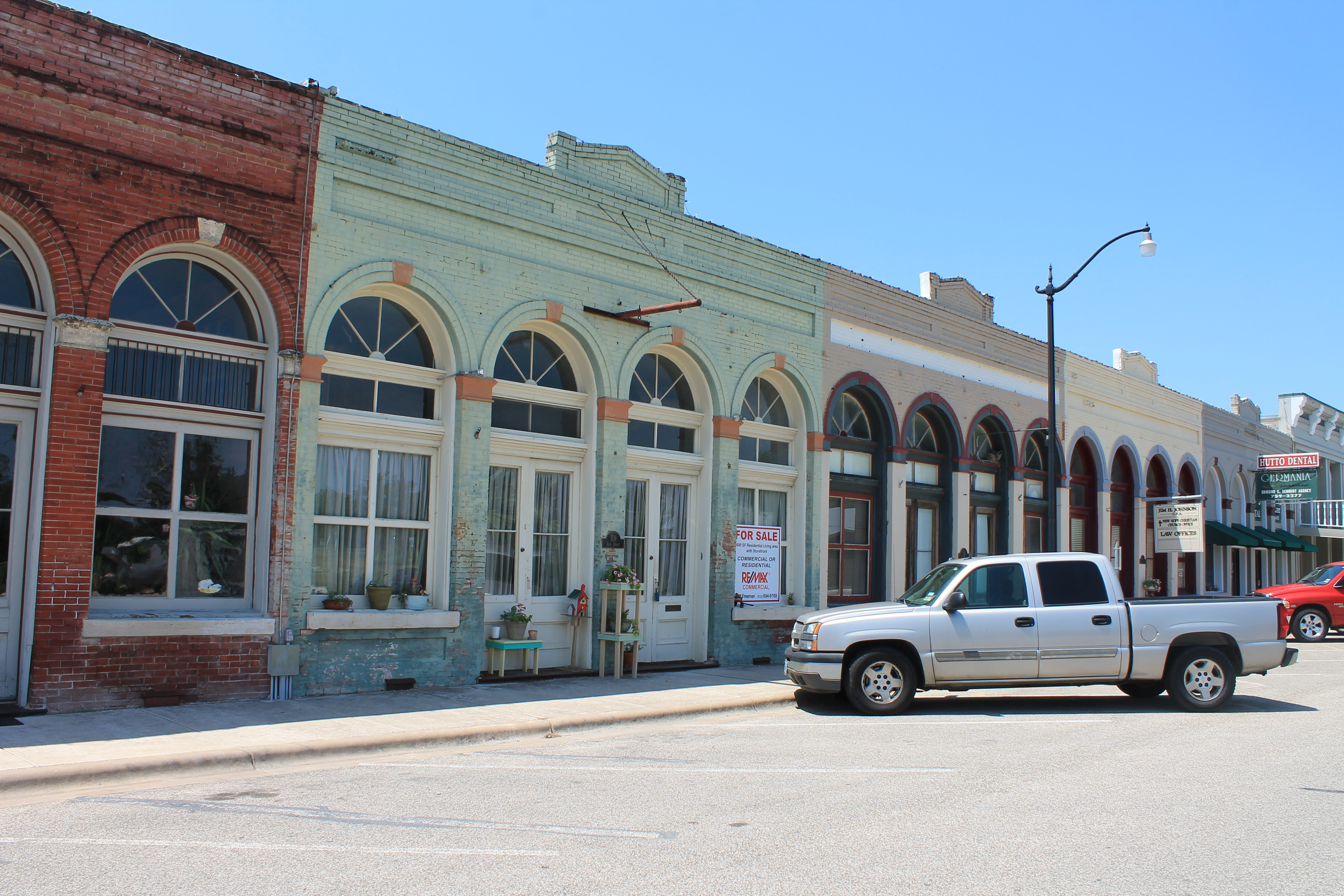

== See also ==
- National Register of Historic Places listings in Williamson County, Texas
