= Hugh Roy Cullen =

American industrialist and philanthropist

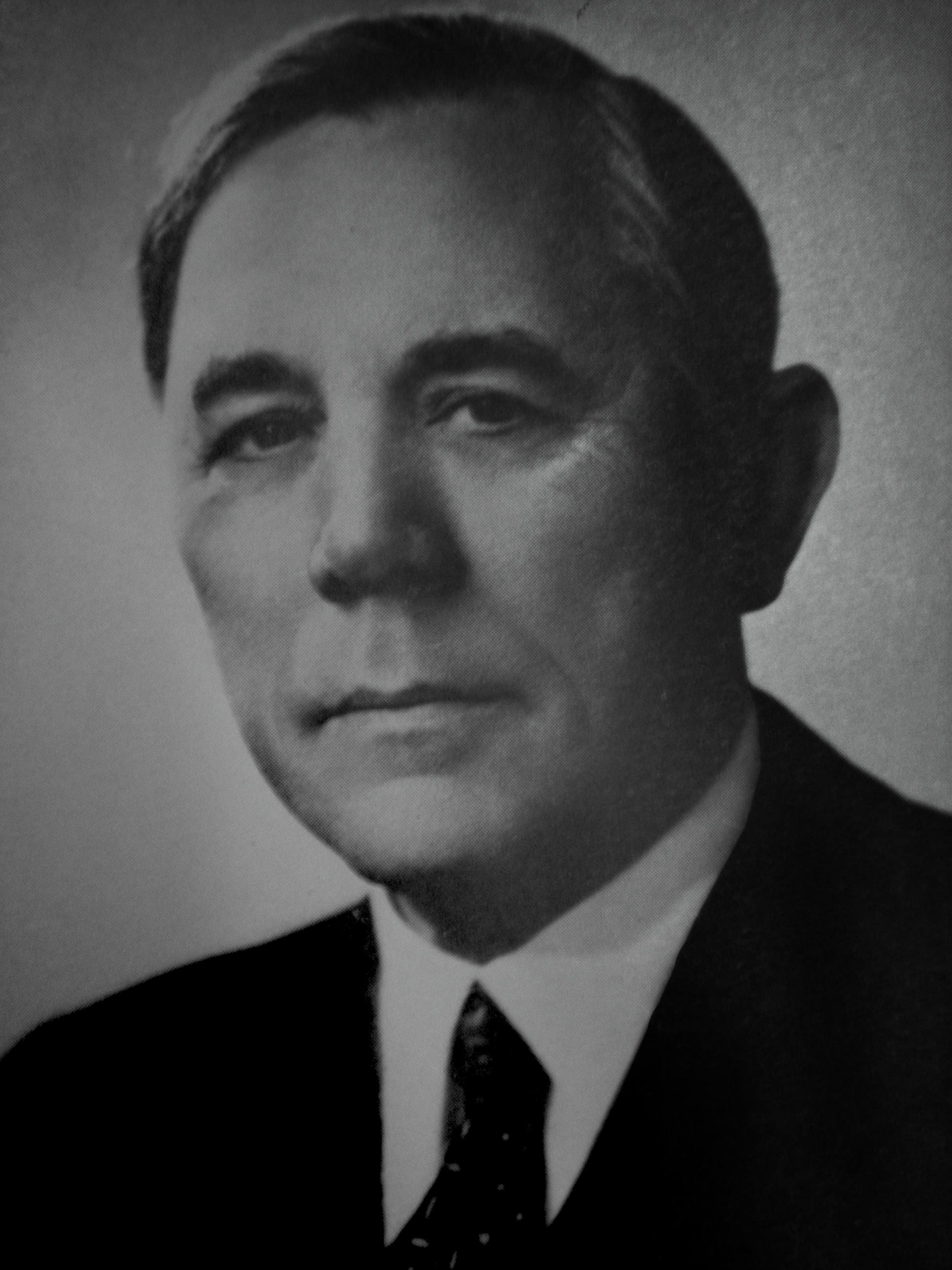
- H.R. Cullen, c. 1947
- Born: July 3, 1881; Denton County, Texas, United States
- Died: July 4, 1957 (aged 76); Houston, Texas, United States
- Occupations: Oilman, Philanthropist
- Known for: Philanthropism
- Spouse: Lillie Cranz Cullen
- Children: Roy Gustav Cullen, Agnes Louise Cullen Arnold, Margaret Cullen Marshall, Wilhelmina Daisy Cullen Smith
- Parent(s): Cicero Cullen, Louise Beck Cullen
- Relatives: Ezekiel Wimberly Cullen
- Website: The Cullen Foundation

Hugh Roy Cullen (July 3, 1881 – July 4, 1957) was an American industrialist and philanthropist. Cullen was involved in the petroleum industry having struck oil near Texas in 1928. He was a supporter of multiple educational institutions in and around Houston, in one of which, the University of Houston, he became a longtime chairman of the board of regents. He is considered one of the most important figures in Texas during the "oil boom" era.

== Biography ==
=== Early life ===
Cullen grew up in San Antonio with his mother and siblings; his father had abandoned the family when Roy was only four years old. A misguided kidnapping attempt by his father a couple of years later brought Roy closer to his mother, who was shaken by the event. Roy lived out his childhood in poverty, even resorting to dropping out of school in the fifth grade to work at a candy factory to help his mother pay the bills. At sixteen years of age, he made for Dallas, where he attempted to make amends with his ailing father. After this proved a failure, he attempted to join the army, recruiting young men to fight in the Spanish–American War. Roy was rejected after his father blew the whistle on Roy's age, too young to fight.

Still seeking a path in life, Roy moved with his half-sister and her husband to Schulenburg, Texas, where he found a job in a cotton-trading office. At eighteen, he became a cotton buyer, a position that had him buying cotton from farmers so that the company, Ralli Brothers, could resell it at a profit. He eventually took a job with a Houston firm and was dispatched to Mangum, Oklahoma, where his recovering father then lived. After marrying Lillie Cranz, his girlfriend of five years, he continued working as an independent cotton broker, but he searched for a new venture after he lost his savings in the Panic of 1907. He discovered that Houston was seeking much shipping business and Roy figured the city was ripe for opportunity. He relocated his family there in 1911 and focused his efforts on learning the business of real estate. After four years of poor results, however, Roy was again down on his luck.

=== Career ===
In 1915, Roy met Jim Cheek, a successful Houston real estate developer whose office was nearby Roy's. Cheek divulged to Roy his plan to enter the risky, but booming, oil industry. Neither man had any prior experience with oil, but they decided to pursue the venture. Roy worked for and traveled with Cheek for the next five years, buying leases on land in Central and West Texas, 43 in total. With investors' $250,000, they had three oil rigs built, but all three were dry. Back in Houston, Lillie would complain to Roy that he traveled too much and didn't spend enough time with his family. In an effort to move his venture closer to home, Roy decided to search for oil on his own and closer to Houston. In the early days of oil exploration, creekology was the common method of finding drilling sites, a method involving looking for certain geological surface features that could indicate an oil field. Usually, a salt dome would be a hopeful sign of oil. Roy knew of one that he felt was promising, and it lay in the old Pierce Junction oil field inside the Houston city limits. He wouldn't drill near the center as the previous drillers had, however; Roy had a hunch that the outskirts of the salt dome, where it dipped in the ground, was where oil could be found. He mustered up $40,000 in investment with the help of Judge R. E. Brooks and together with $20,000 of his own savings, Roy bought a lease on the land from Gulf Oil. He hired Judge Brooks' son Emory to do the drilling job and after some delays, drilling began in the spot that Roy had picked out. It ended up being a "gusher" and was producing 2,500 barrels of oil a day. Roy's investors were impressed and most decided to fund other drill sites. The three other sites drilled came up dry, but the investors still made 300% returns on the initial gusher.

After several failed oil wells, Roy reevaluated how drilling was being done; he realized that oil wasn't being drilled for farther than 4,000 below the surface, beyond which were oil-rich sands. He decided to go to his investors with a plan to reach these sands, known as the Frio sands. He would drill deeper into the ground, despite technical issues and the higher cost, in order to reach the large oil deposits. The investors took the chance, and the result was the second Pierce Junction gusher, giving Roy his confidence again and establishing him as a respectable oilman.

One of Roy's original investors, Jim West, a highly successful Texas lumberman, approached him with an offer to partner with Roy to run West's Western Production Company. West laid $3,000,000 on the table and promised Roy the title of President and complete charge of the company if he accepted. After a week of ignoring West's offer, Roy declined it, but proffered a new arrangement: Roy would put up $5,000 and West would match it. Upon being asked why that offer was better than $3,000,000 up front, Roy said that with his arrangement, he wouldn't be working for West.

The partners squabbled over where to drill their acres for oil. One such salt dome, the Blue Ridge dome, had been previously drilled by West, but Roy insisted on drilling its flanks. The resulting well brought in 60,000 barrels of oil a day. Roy had similar fortunes drilling the perimeter of the old Humble Field, championing a troublesome layer of shale rock 3,500 feet below the surface, eventually reaching oil-rich Yegua sand. Also at this site, Roy displayed his characteristic approach to his job in that he led by example instead of from a distance; he led the wrangling of an errant pipe to the admiration of the crew.

He enjoyed the success of his business into his fifties.

=== Zoning activist ===
In 1948, Cullen led the effort to prevent new zoning regulation for land development in the city of Houston. This was in response to a group of zoning advocates led by Jesse H. Jones, financier and owner of the Houston Chronicle. Cullen believed zoning regulations to be socialist and un-American. Two more attempts to introduce zoning regulations to the city of Houston failed in 1962 and 1993.

=== Personal life and philanthropy ===
Cullen married Lillie Cranz in 1902 and had five children: Roy Gustav, Lillie, Agnes, Margaret, and Wilhelmina.

In 1938, the Cullens made a contribution to build the Roy Gustav Cullen Building on the new campus of the University of Houston. He would continue to make large donations to the university throughout his lifetime. The Cullen Foundation is still a large contributor to the school.

Cullen had been in his early life a Democrat, but supported Herbert Hoover and other Republicans after 1929, due to the belief that the Democratic Party was, at the national level, the party of machine politics and socialism, labelling FDR's policies the 'Jew Deal'. Additionally, he was critical of fellow Houston leader Jesse H. Jones. He also supported the Dixiecrats:

"Although Cullen aided the Dixiecrat movement in 1948, he normally supported Republican candidates, particularly Dwight D. Eisenhower in 1952."

In 1946, he donated the land in Houston that later became Texas Southern University.

In 1946, the Cullens helped to found St. John's School.

In 1947, the Cullens created the Cullen Foundation. The still extant foundation continues the Cullens legacy of significant support for educational institutions. It funded the expansion and renovation of what became known as the Hugh Roy and Lillie Cullen Building of Southwestern University in Georgetown, Texas.

In late 1954, less than three years before his death, Cullen's fortune was estimated to be $200–300 million.

Cullen is the grandfather of coal magnate Corbin Robertson, Jr.

== See also ==
- Cullen College of Engineering
- Cullen Center
- The Lillie and Hugh Roy Cullen Sculpture Garden
