= Georgetown Light and Water Works =

- U.S. National Register of Historic Places
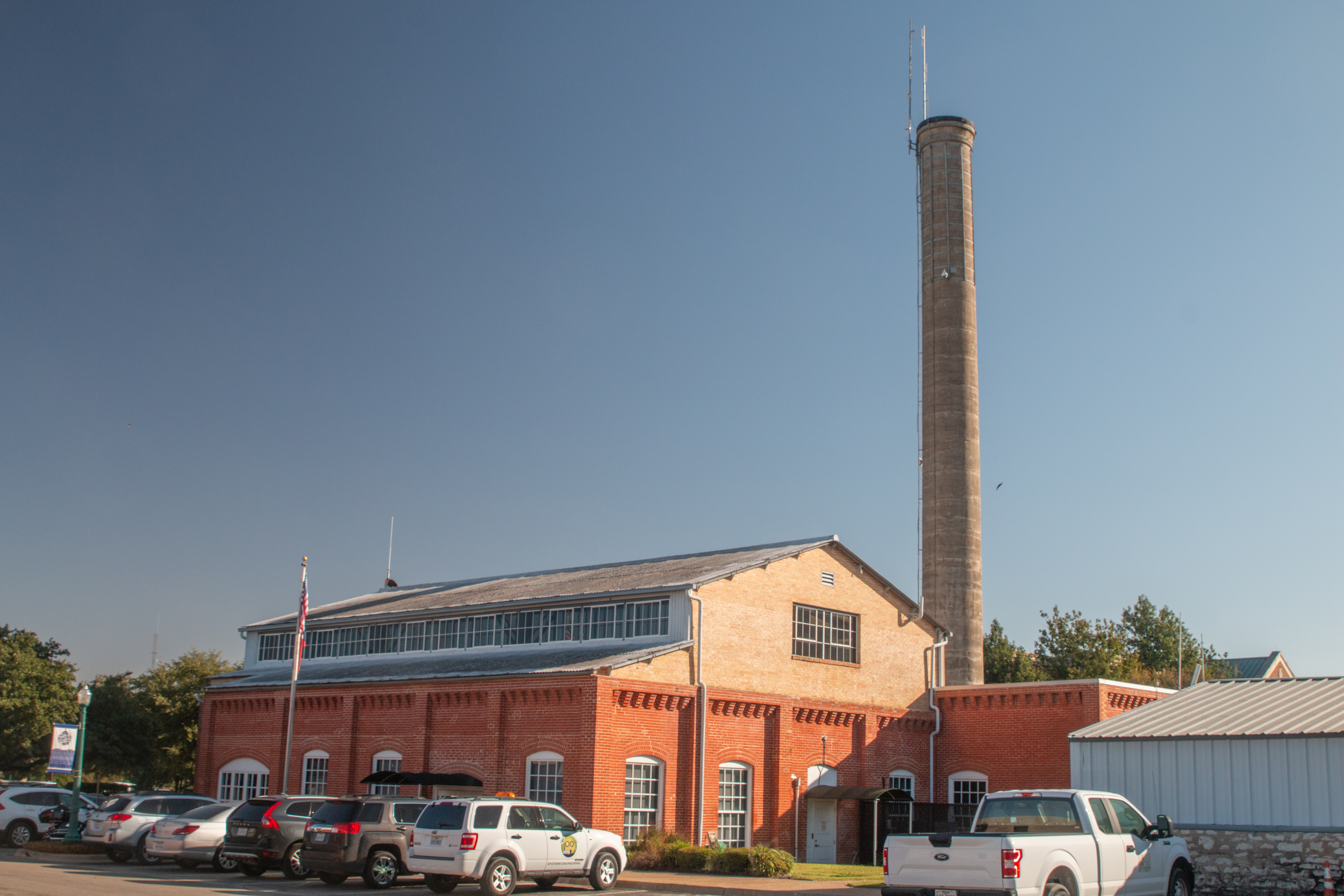
- Georgetown Light and Water Works in 2019

- Location within Texas Location within the United States
- Location: 403 W. 9th, Georgetown, Texas
- Coordinates: 30°38′10″N 97°40′51″W
- Area: less than one acre
- Built: 1911
- MPS: Georgetown MRA
- NRHP reference No.: 96000074
- Added to NRHP: February 16, 1996

The Georgetown Light and Water Works is a historic brick industrial building in Georgetown, Texas. It was built in 1911 and added to the National Register of Historic Places in 1996 for its industrial architecture. In 1985 and 1986, the building was remodeled to serve as Georgetown's police station.

== See also ==
- National Register of Historic Places listings in Williamson County, Texas
