= Martha E. Whitten =

American poet (1842–1917)

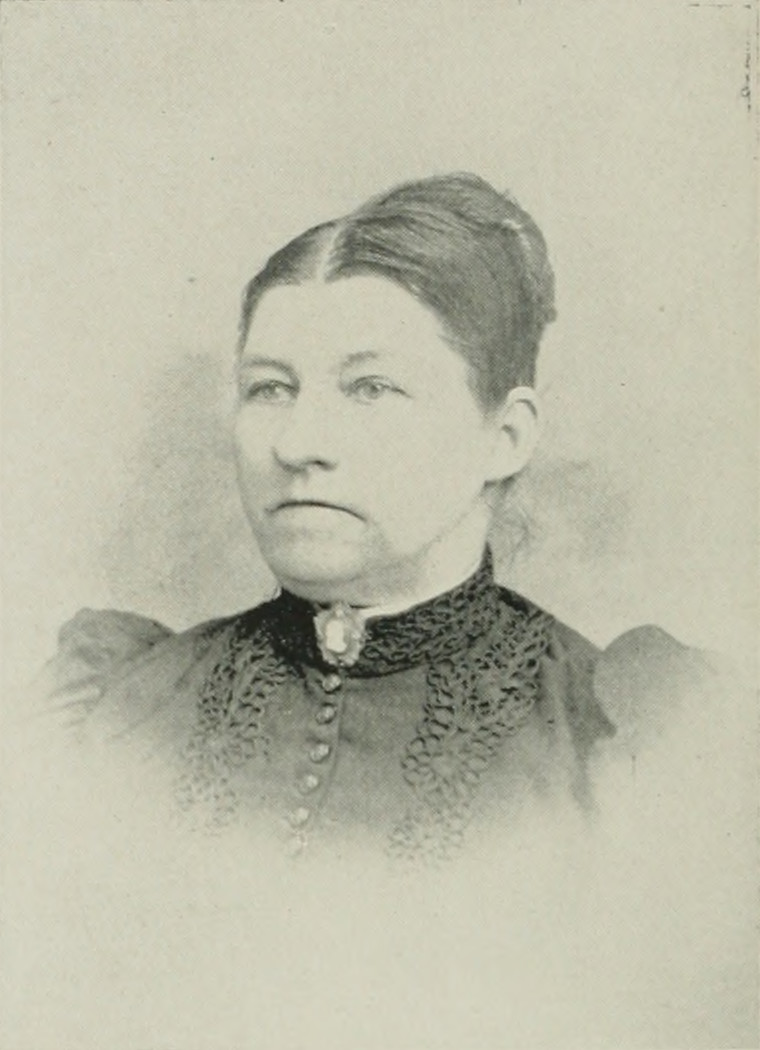
- Photo in A Woman of the Century
- Born: Martha Elizabeth Hotchkiss; October 3, 1842 near Austin, Texas, U.S.
- Died: February 8, 1917 (aged 74); Austin, Texas
- Education: McKenzie College
- Occupation: author
- Spouses: Thomas Miller Bostick (m. 1858; died 1866); Aaron Hill Whitten (m. 1871)
- Children: 4
- Writing career
- Notable work: "The Snow"

Martha E. Whitten (née, Hotchkiss; after first marriage, Bostick; after second marriage, Whitten; October 3, 1842 – February 8, 1917) was an American author. It was while raising a large family that she wrote most of her poems, contributing many of them to the secular and religious press of the country. Her most famous poem is "The Snow". Whitten's longest poem —"The Dear Old Home"— had many admirers. It is highly descriptive, and establishes the ability of the author as a writer of poems of place. She also wrote several hymns. Texas Garlands was published in 1886.

== Early life and education ==
Martha Elizabeth Hotchkiss was born near Austin, Texas, on 3 October 1842. She was the daughter of Hon. William S. Hotchkiss, a Texas pioneer, and Hannah B. Hotchkiss. Her brothers became Methodist ministers.

Whitten's mother died when she was ten years old, which inspired her first poem. Recognizing her talent, Col. John S. Ford encouraged her to write and published her poems in a paper he was editing in the 1850s.

Her father became a resident of Austin when she was five years old, and she entered the Collegiate Female Institute in Austin. When she was six, her father bought a tract of land near Austin, where he built a residence for his family. Whitten commented about this home: "In it were combined the changeful scenery of flowery meadow and shady woodland, towering cliffs and sloping hillside, and all this bounded by a bright sparkling stream that laughed and sang and charmed my very soul."

At the age of fourteen, she was sent to McKenzie College, and soon after, wrote her poem "Do They Miss Me at Home?" She was a classmate of Florence Duval West.

== Career ==
On September 23, 1858, she married Thomas Miller Bostick. Their children included William, Daniel, Taliaferro, and Thomas. Widowed in 1866 at the age of 24, she was left without money or home and little knowledge of business. She resorted to teaching as a means of support for herself and her young sons, and soon secured a comfortable home and other property. She married Aaron Hill Whitten, circa 1871.

Whitten wrote on a variety of subjects and displayed great versatility in her poems, which were often descriptive and treated historical subjects. Her poems were collected in 1886 in book-form under the title of Texas Garlands. The collection won appreciation in the literary world and were a financial success. She wrote many poems after the publication of her book. She read a poem before a Chautauqua audience on Poet's Day, July 23, 1888, and one written by request, and read in Tuscola, Illinois, July 4, 1889, to a large audience. In the 1890s, she was engaged on her Sketch-Book, containing prose and poetry, letters of travel and fiction.

== Personal life ==
She married twice and reared a large family, living her entire life in Austin, with the exception of a short period during the Civil War. She was affiliated with the University United Methodist Church.

Whitten became paralyzed on February 1, 1917, and was hospitalized in Austin, unable to speak after the attack. She died February 8, 1917, in Austin, survived by four children and three brothers.

== Selected works ==
- Texas Garlands (1886)

=== Hymns ===
- Christian soldier, don thy armor, Have thy burnish'd
- Full many a ship that was nobly manned
- Heard you not that railroad whistle
- I long, O my Savior and God
- Loudly sounds the thrilling signal
- The holy Christmas comes again
- The Lord is risen, the Lord is risen
- 'Tis sweet, 'tis passing sweet to know
- With stealthy tread the years have crept
