= Grace Heritage Center =

Church building in Georgetown, Texas, U.S.

- Grace Episcopal Church
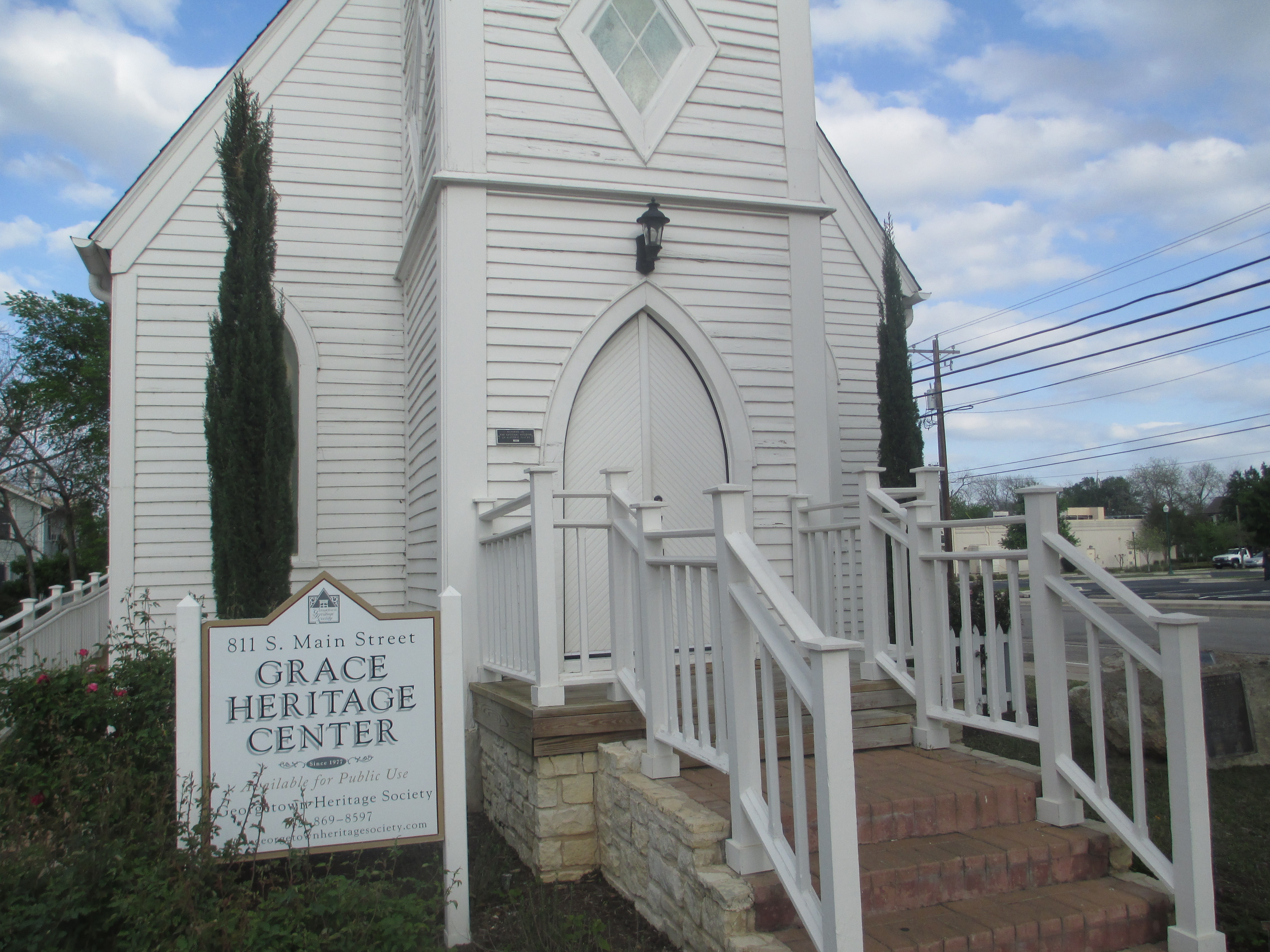
- The building's exterior in 2013
- Grace Heritage Center
- 30.63591°N 97.67674°W
- Location: Georgetown, Texas
- Country: United States
- Denomination: Episcopal
- Website: Official website

Architecture
- Heritage designation: National Register of Historic Places
- Designated: 1986-1999
- Years built: 1881

Specifications
- Materials: Wood

Grace Heritage Center (formerly Grace Episcopal Church) is a church building located at 817 South Main Street in Georgetown, Texas, United States. Built in 1881, the building is the city's oldest wood-framed church.

The building was added to the National Register of Historic Places on April 29, 1986, and later removed on February 17, 1999.

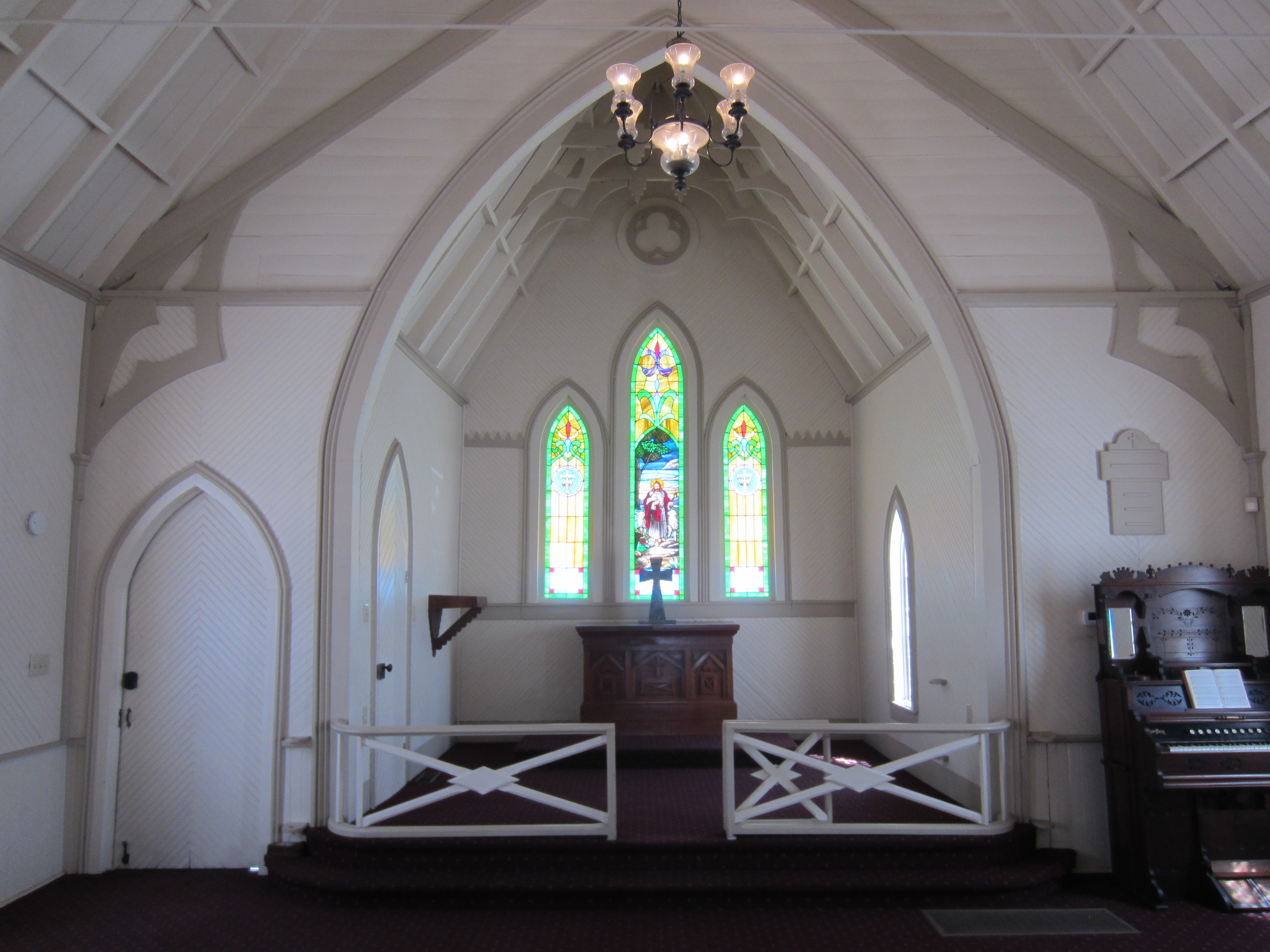
Interior, 2018

== See also ==
- National Register of Historic Places listings in Williamson County, Texas
