= Harper–Chesser House =

Historic house in Texas, United States

- U.S. National Register of Historic Places
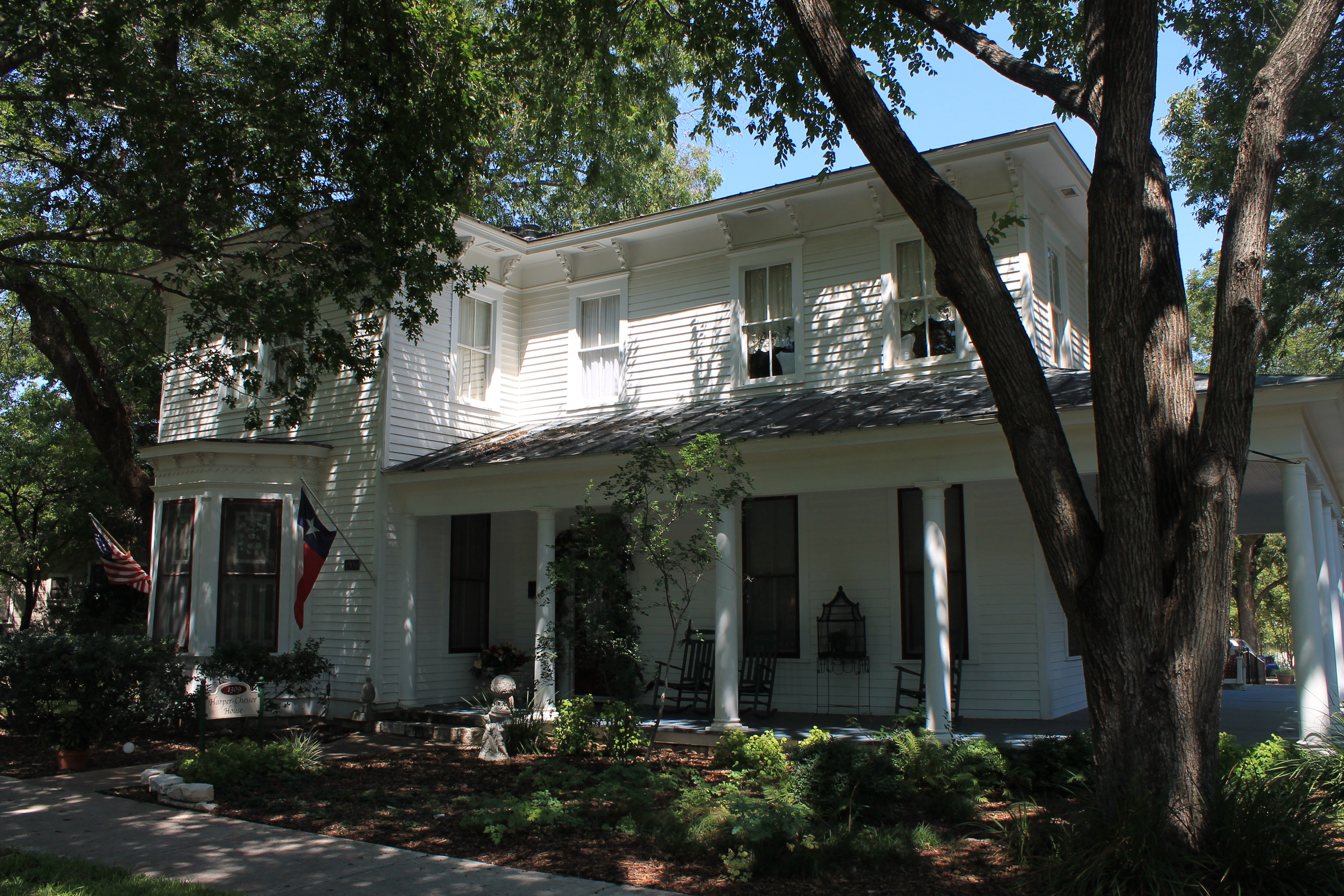
- Harper–Chesser House in 2012

- Location within Texas Location within the United States
- Location: 1309 College, Georgetown, Texas
- Coordinates: 30°37′54″N 97°40′17″W
- Area: less than one acre
- Built: 1860
- MPS: Georgetown MRA
- NRHP reference No.: 86000969
- Added to NRHP: April 29, 1986

Harper–Chesser House is a historic house listed on the National Register of Historic Places in Georgetown, Texas, United States. The house was built in 1890 by County Judge D.S. Chesser. It is located at 1309 College Street.

== Photo gallery ==
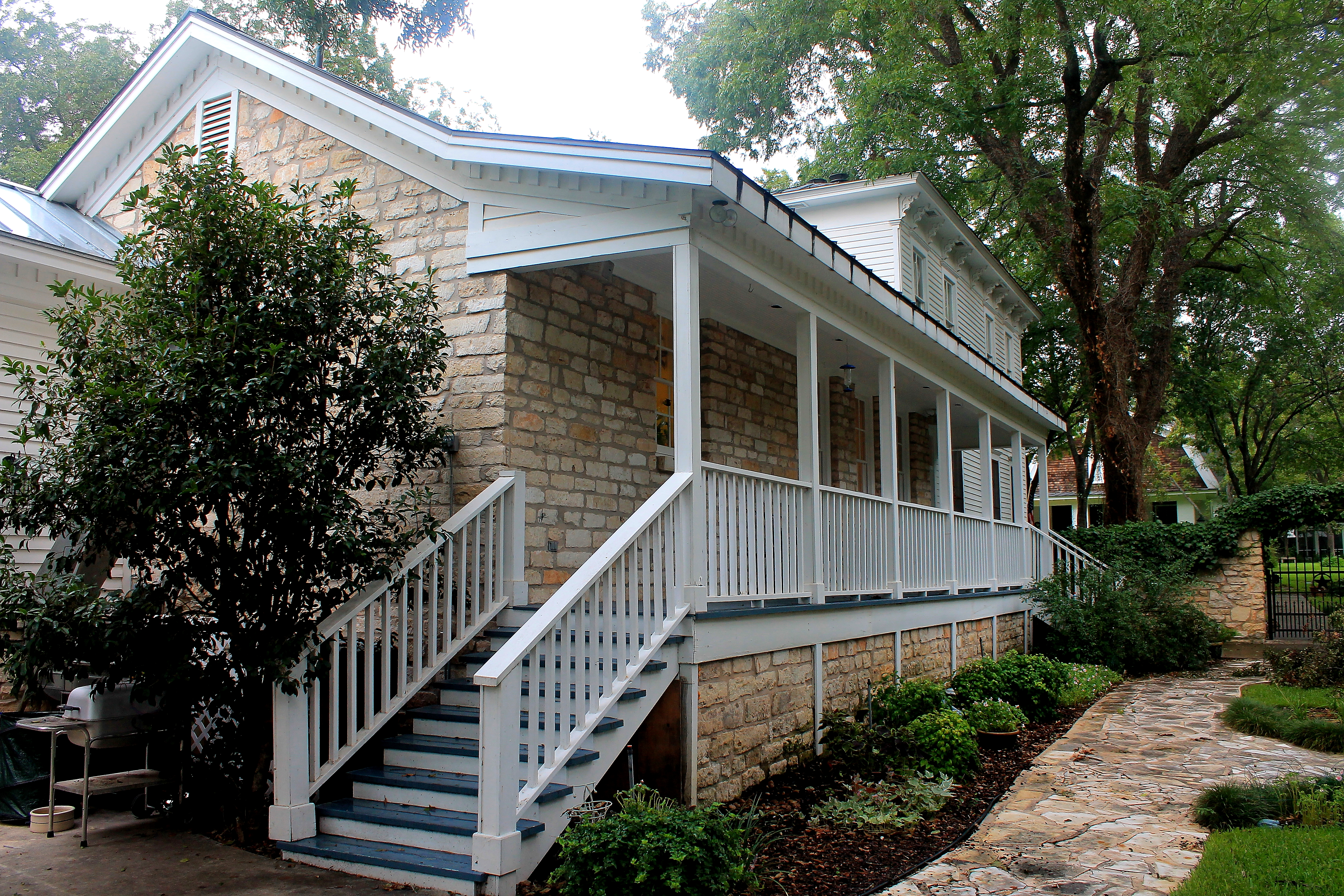

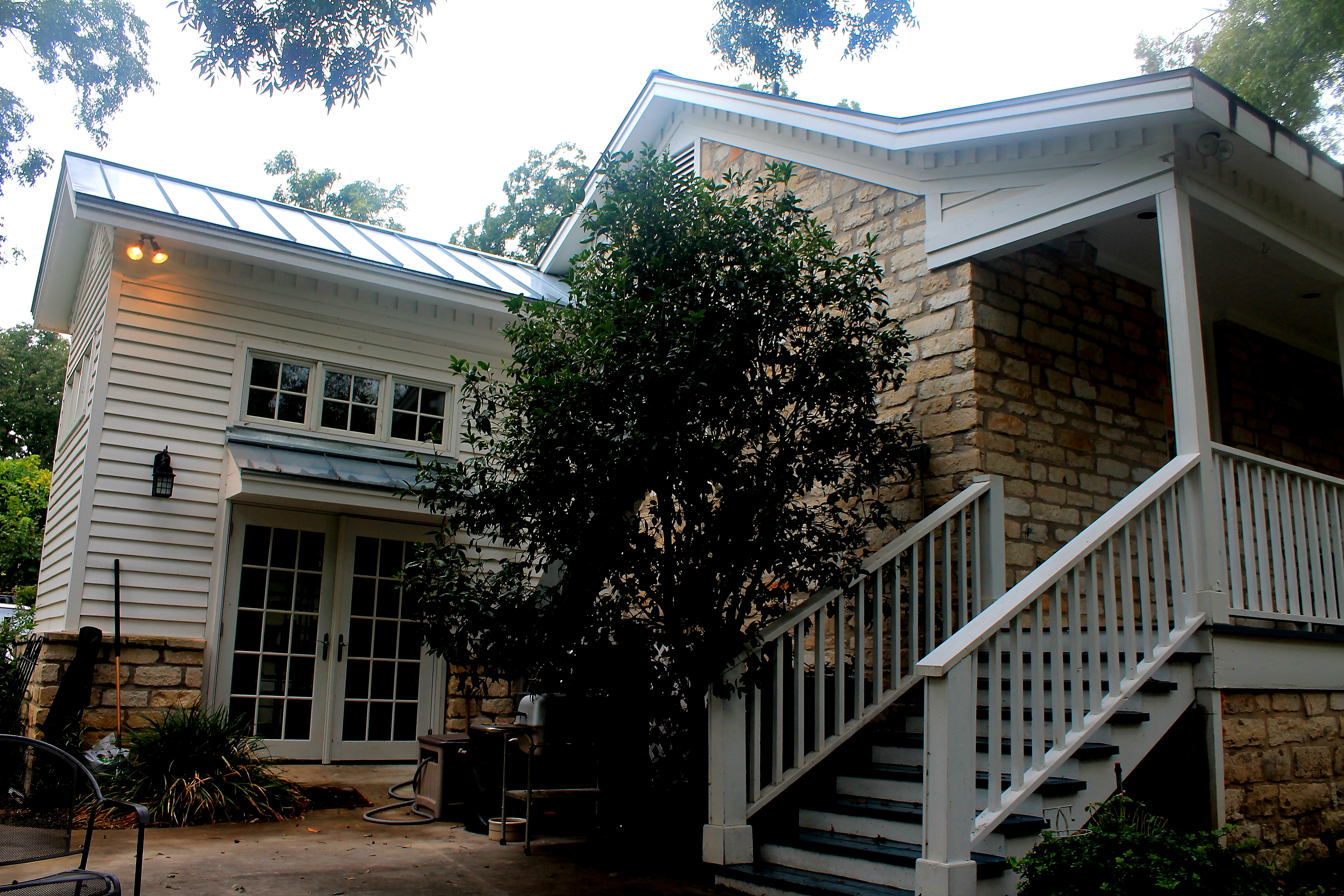

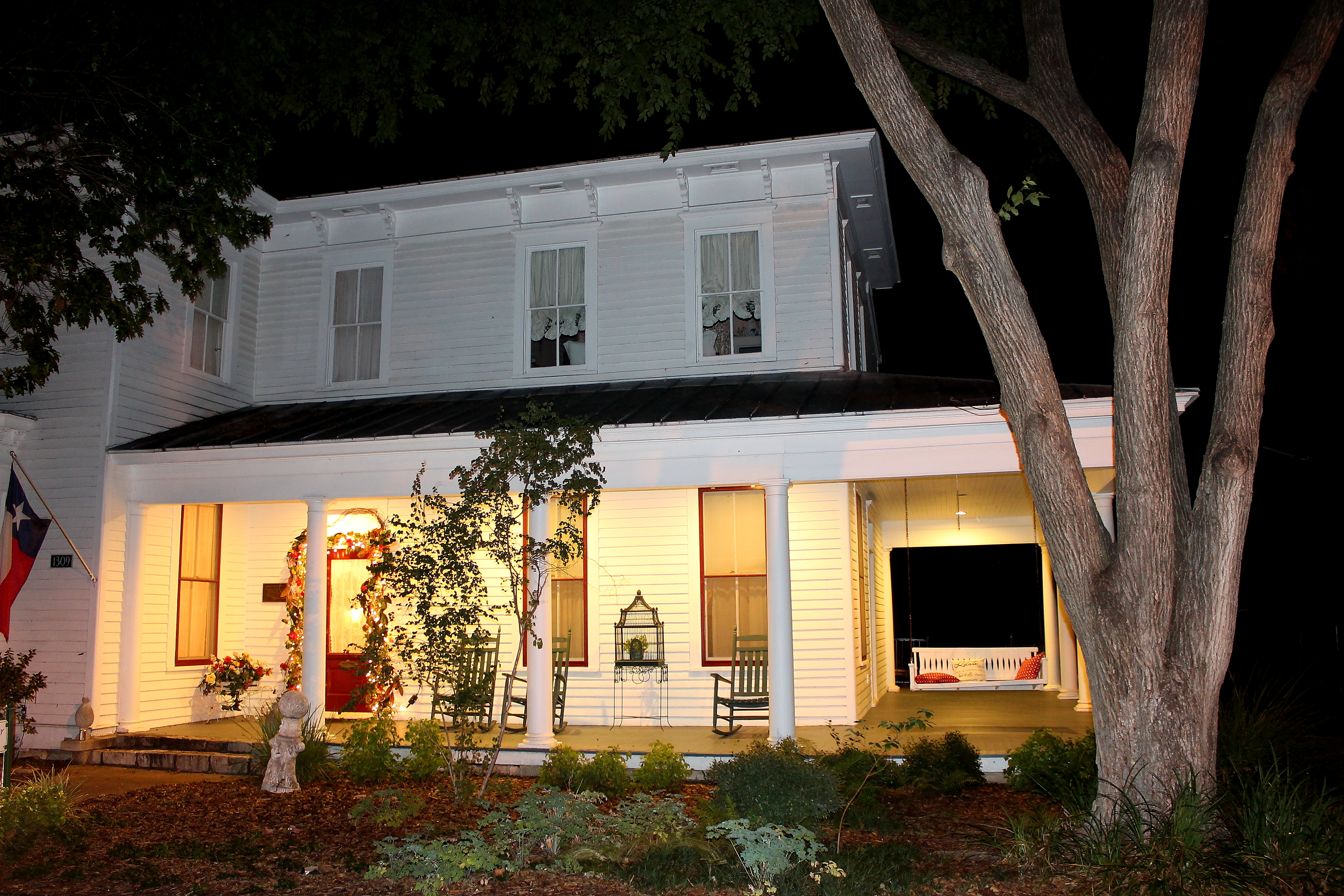

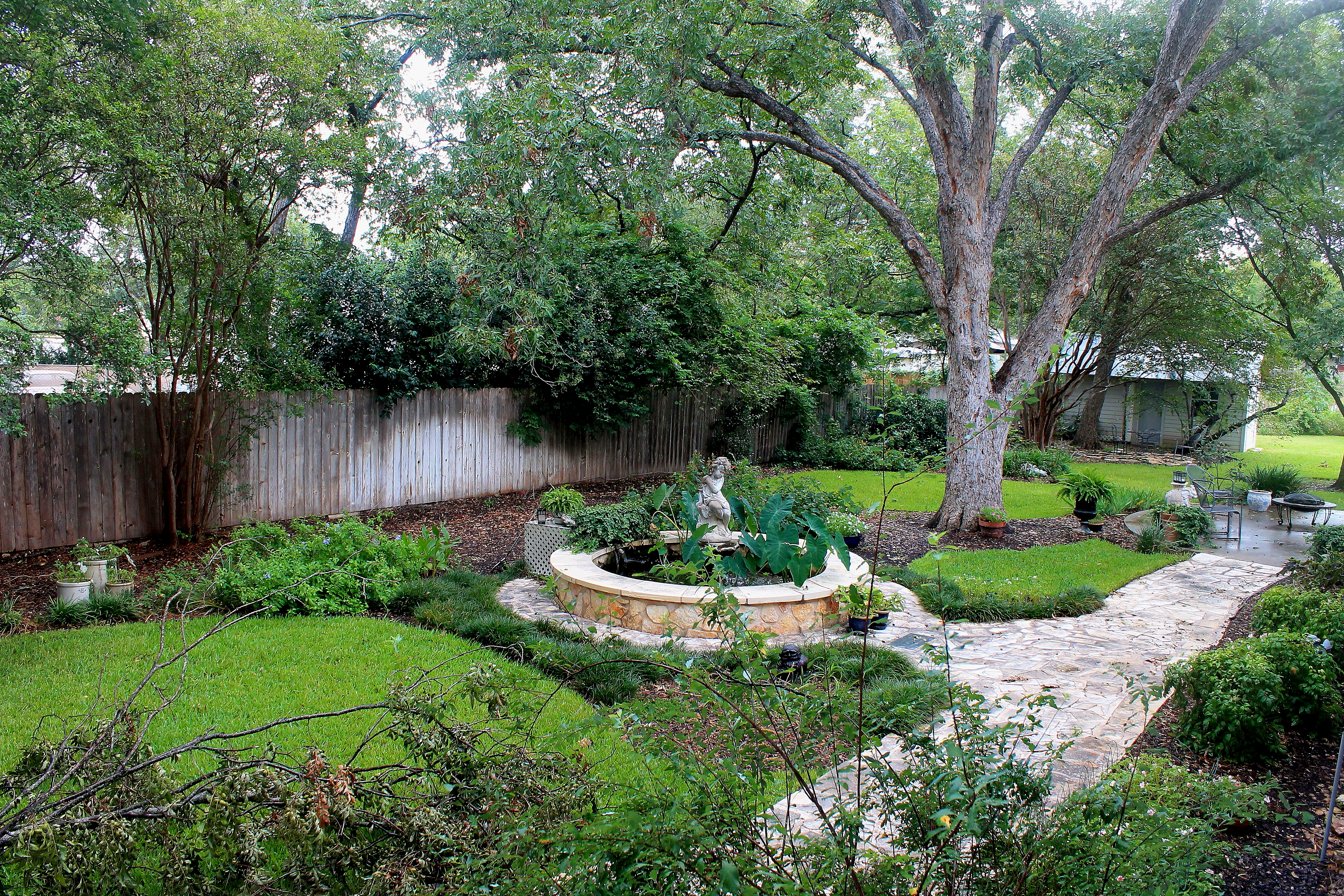

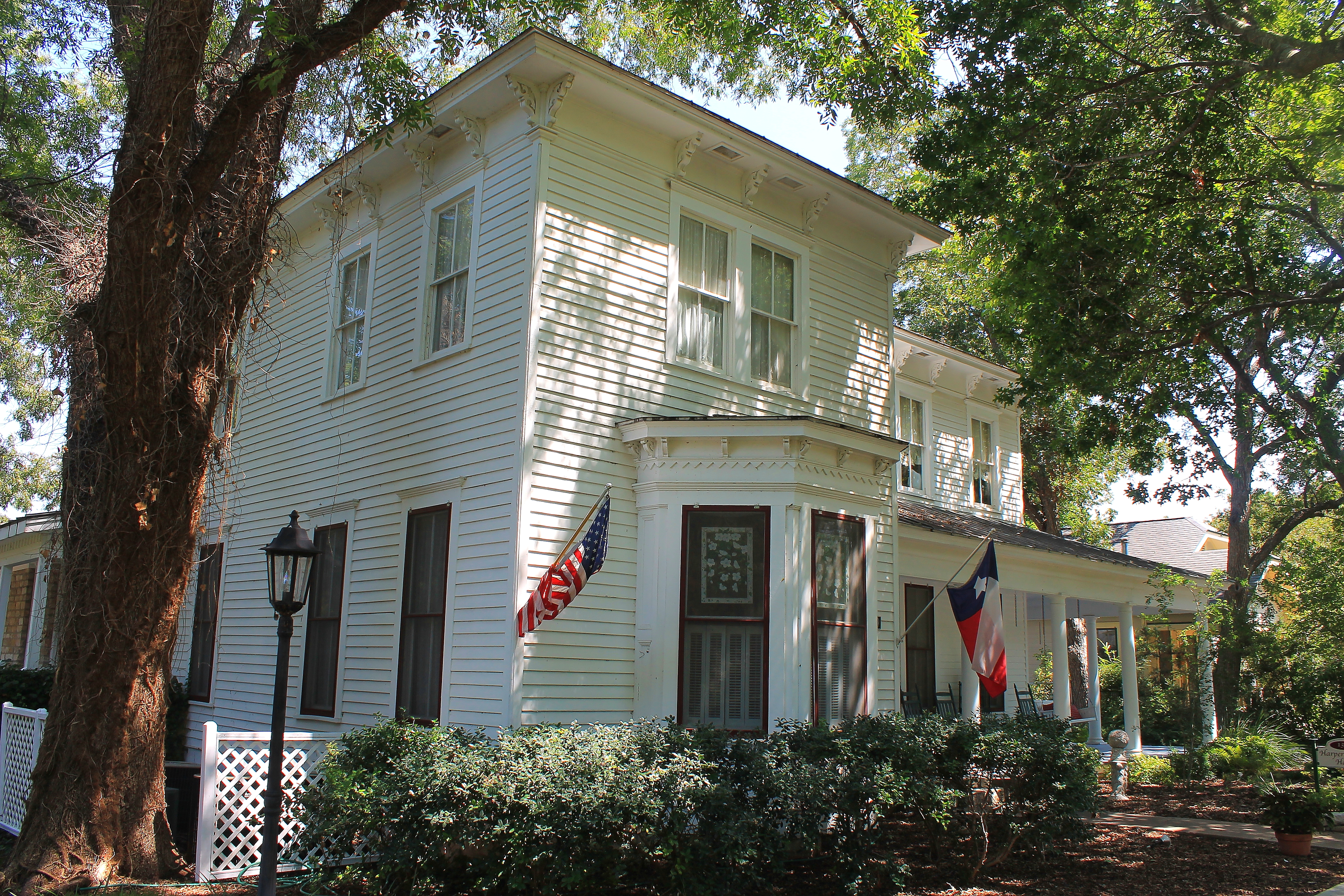

== See also ==
- National Register of Historic Places listings in Williamson County, Texas
