= First Methodist Church (Georgetown, Texas) =

Historic church in Texas, United States

- U.S. National Register of Historic Places
- Recorded Texas Historic Landmark
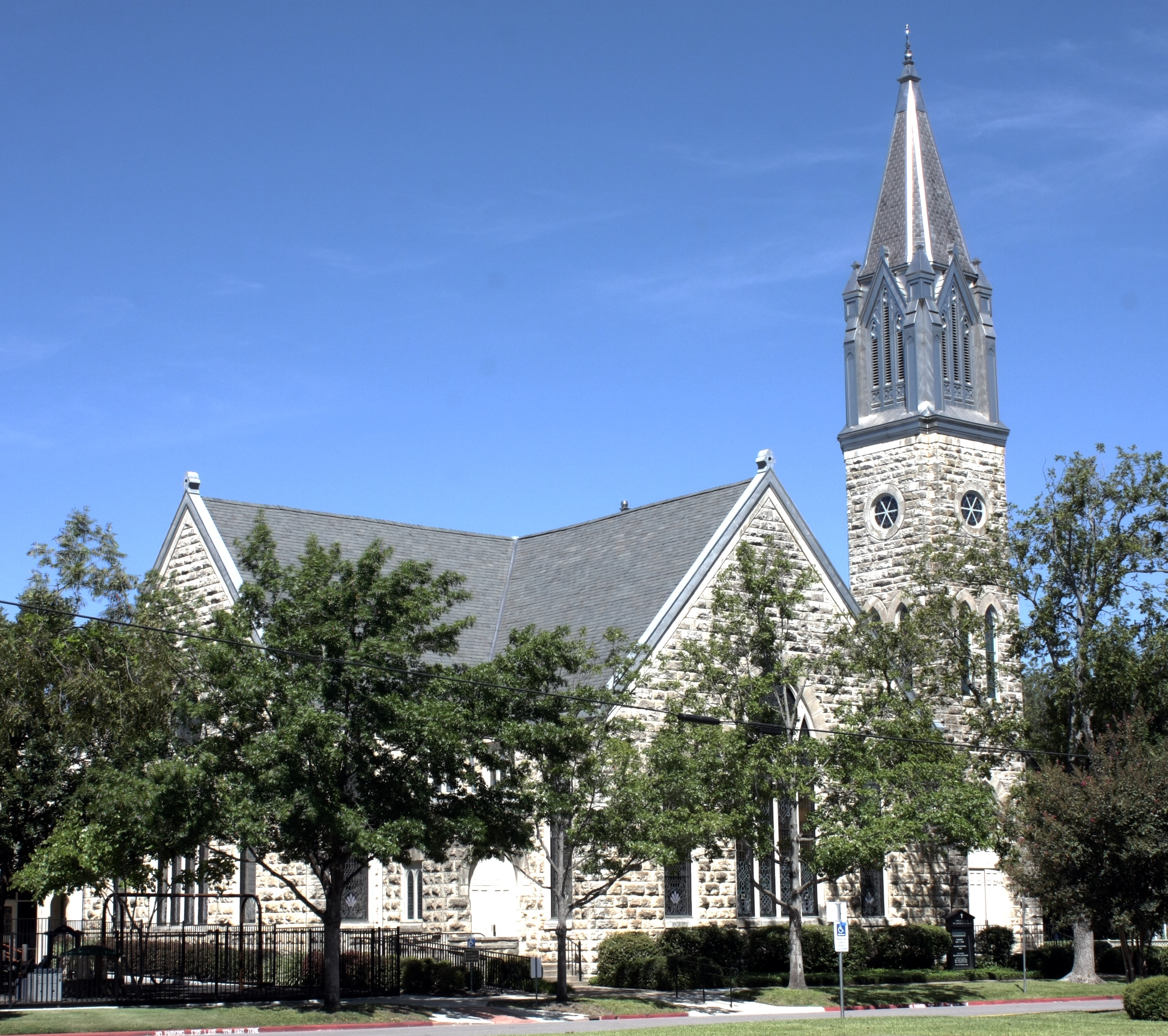
- First Methodist Church in 2012

- Location within Texas Location within the United States
- Location: 410 E. University, Georgetown, Texas
- Coordinates: 30°37′58″N 97°40′23″W
- Area: less than one acre
- Built: 1891
- Architect: Dr. Robert S. Hyer
- Architectural style: Gothic Revival
- MPS: Georgetown MRA
- NRHP reference No.: 86001368
- RTHL No.: 9090

Significant dates
- Added to NRHP: June 17, 1986
- Designated RTHL: 1974

First Methodist Church is a historic church at 410 E. University in Georgetown, Texas.

It was built in 1891 and added to the National Register in Texas.

== See also ==
- National Register of Historic Places listings in Williamson County, Texas
- Recorded Texas Historic Landmarks in Williamson County
