= McKenzie College (Texas) =

- Dormitories at McKenzie College
- Type: Private
- Active: 1841–1868
- Affiliations: Methodist
- Location: Clarksville, Texas, United States
- Campus: Rural 421 acres

McKenzie College, also called McKenzie's College, was a private college located on the plantation of Reverend John W. P. McKenzie, a Methodist minister, in Clarksville, Texas, United States. Starting in 1841, the school grew from 16 students educated in a log cabin to over 300 students and 9 faculty members occupying four large buildings in 1854. (Note: Three of the buildings were dormitories - one for girls and two for boys.) It was the largest institution of higher education in Texas during the 1850s and 1860s. Before the American Civil War began, it trained almost all of the new Methodist ministers in the state. Unable to retain financial support after the War, Rev. McKenzie closed the school in June, 1868. He served for a year as the first president of another Methodist school, Marvin College in Waxahachie, Texas, then completely retired from church-related work. He died in Clarksville on June 20, 1881.

== History ==
John Witherspoon Pettigrew McKenzie (most often abbreviated to John W. P. McKenzie) was a native of North Carolina who was admitted to the Tennessee Conference of the Methodist Episcopal Church in 1836. He was soon transferred into the Arkansas Conference, which had been established on the Texas frontier. This conference assigned John and his wife Matilda (Note: McKenzie had married Matilda Hye Parkes on September 29, 1829, in Burke County, North Carolina.) as missionaries to the people of the Choctaw Nation, who had just been removed from their homes in various Southeastern states to the Indian Territory., p. 13. In 1839, the conference appointed John and Matilda to the Clarksville Circuit inside the Republic of Texas. (Note: The Clarksville Circuit, also named as the Sulphur Fork Circuit, involved responsibility for the area from the Red River on the north. east to the Sulphur River on the south. then west ro the area of present day Dallas and Denison. It took several months ro make one trip around the circuit in those days., p.13.) In 1836, Matilda became a teacher in the first school for girls opened in the Choctaw Nation of Indian Territory (near Shawneetown in present-day McCurtain County, Oklahoma.)

Suffering from poor health, Reverend John W. P. McKenzie retired from missionary work in 1841 and moved to a 421-acre (1.70 km^{2}) plantation 3 miles (4.8 km) southwest of Clarksville, Texas. He began offering classes for local boys in his home, which he named Itinerant's Retreat. As the school grew, a separate log cabin was built. Most of the first students were receiving primary and secondary education, although the school awarded its first bachelor's degree in 1844. By 1845, the school was divided into three departments: preparatory, collegiate, and female. Four buildings were built in 1853 to accommodate the school's rapid growth.

McKenzie, and most of the school's other instructors, were Methodists, but did not pressure their students who adhered to other denominations to become Methodists. For example, B. F. Fuller, a Baptist, admitted later that he was nervous about enrolling in McKenzie College and the difficulty he anticipated having there because of doctrinal differences. The experience allayed his fear. He not only continued his education there, but a few years later, still a Baptist, became a teacher at McKenzie., p. 13.

Always considered a Methodist institution, McKenzie's school was actually controlled by the Methodist Conference for one year, (Note: Rev. McKenzie initially attempted to deed the school to the church in 1855, but the agreement was rejected because of certain conditions the founder included that the Conference could not fulfill. In 1860, the school reported a total enrollment of 246 students, with a faculty of eight teachers., p.15. He tried again in 1860, but by the end of that school year, most of the all-male student body had enlisted in the Confederate Army, so the church returned the property to Rev. McKenzie.) After 1860, the college formed a military department that organized all male students into companies, in which they performed daily drills. In June 1861, McKenzie cancelled the final examinations and the graduation ceremonies that normally ended the school year.

By 1863, the enrollment had dropped to 33, and rose to an average of 74 for the period 1864–67. Unable to keep the institution financially independent, McKenzie and his son-in-law, Smith Ragsdale, closed it on June 25, 1868.

Giving up on restoring his school, McKenzie accepted an appointment as the first president of the Church-owned Marvin College in Waxahachie, Texas, but served for only one year, 1868–9. (Marvin College closed in 1878.) McKenzie returned to Clarksville and retired. He died there early in the morning of Monday, June 20, 1881, just after his school's regular morning prayers.

== Student life ==
The Handbook of Texas states that about half of the students came from the Red River area, 40 percent came from other parts of Texas and 10 percent came from Arkansas and Louisiana. The school year was 10 months long, and the cost for 10 months tuition, board, room and laundry was $180. (Note: If the student could not pay cash, other arrangements could be made, such as payment in produce or even with the horse and saddle that the student rode from his home to the school.)

Initially, the student body was all male. It is unclear when the first females were admitted, but Jordan notes that during the prosperous 1845-1860 period the school had two competing newspapers: The Bee, which was run by young women, and The Owl, run by young men. A third paper, The School Monthly, began publication somewhat later.

The college was home to two literary societies, the Philologian Society and Dialectic Society.

Female students were enrolled in the Female Department, which was supervised by the founder's wife. Their academic curriculum was substantially the same as that required for the young men, but upon graduation, they were awarded diplomas, rather than degrees.

== Facilities ==
McKenzie College first opened in the fall of 1841, with 16 to 18 students at the high school or elementary levels. Classes met in a single log cabin that was 16 feet (4.9 m) by 20 feet (6.1 m) in size. By 1853–4, the school had expanded into what was described by one student as "... four large, multi-story buildings." The McKenzie's home also served as a dormitory for young women. Two of the new buildings, named Grant and Duke, to honor their donors, became dormitories for male students. Two floors of the Main Building contained the chapel, offices, recitation rooms, laboratory, and library, as well as a book store. The third floor was used by the literary societies for their meetings, debates, and oratory., p. 15.

== Notable alumni ==
- Martha E. Whitten (1842–1917), author
- William Johnson McDonald (1844-1926) lawyer, banker, philanthropist
