= Creekology =

Creekology is a petroleum prospecting method which appeared in the 19th century in US south gas-oil states. In its simplest form, it is the search for above-ground indications of oil, such as natural seeps and creeks. Creekologists also placed wells on singular points of a territory in accordance with landscape features. The placing of wells often occurred near, or on, linear objects - erosion relief forms (valleys, creeks, etc.) - giving rise to the term creekology. The success rates of some creekologists in the 19th century were very high - 80-90% of their wells gave production.

== New creekology ==
In the middle of the 20th century some geologists formed an idea about existing fault-fold systems in the Earth's crust, in sediment cover, and this gave creekology a "scientific base". Linear forms in Earth landscape connect with fault tectonics, and some folds near faults can be reservoirs of hydrocarbons. The non-fold types of traps mark by lineation too (paleo-rivers formed on faults). Now some geologists mark probable gas-oil areas with the help of space image lineation interpreting. This activity can be defined as "new creekology".

== See also ==
- Oil Exploration
