= National Register of Historic Places listings in Williamson County, Texas =

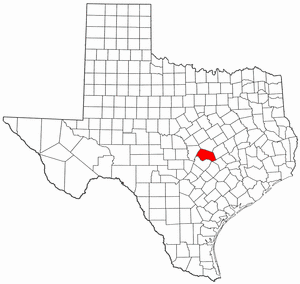
Location of Williamson County in Texas

This is a list of the National Register of Historic Places listings in Williamson County, Texas.

This is intended to be a complete list of properties and districts listed on the National Register of Historic Places in Williamson County, Texas. There are eight districts, 66 individual properties, and one former property listed on the National Register in the county. Individually listed properties include one State Antiquities Landmark and 20 Recorded Texas Historic Landmarks while six districts include several more Recorded Texas Historic Landmarks including one that is also a State Antiquities Landmark.

This National Park Service list is complete through NPS recent listings posted March 21, 2025.

== Current listings ==
The publicly disclosed locations of National Register properties and districts may be seen in a mapping service provided.

	Name on the Register	Image	Date listed	Location	City or town	Description
1	Martin C. Amos House	Martin C. Amos House	April 29, 1986 (#86000989)	1408 Olive; 30°37′53″N 97°40′01″W	Georgetown	Recorded Texas Historic Landmark; part of Olive Street Historic District; Historic Resources of Georgetown MRA
2	Arnold-Torbet House	Arnold-Torbet House	April 29, 1986 (#86000990)	908 Pine; 30°38′07″N 97°40′13″W	Georgetown	Historic Resources of Georgetown MRA
3	Atkinson House	Atkinson House	April 29, 1986 (#86000992)	911 Walnut; 30°38′08″N 97°40′13″W	Georgetown	Recorded Texas Historic Landmark; Historic Resources of Georgetown MRA
4	Bartlett Commercial Historic District	Bartlett Commercial Historic District	September 30, 1980 (#80004076)	E. Clark St. 30°47′42″N 97°25′37″W	Bartlett	Extends into Bell County
5	Belford Historic District	Belford Historic District	April 29, 1986 (#86000991)	Roughly bounded by University Ave., Main, E. Eighteenth, and Austin; 30°37′48″N 97°40′39″W	Georgetown	Includes Recorded Texas Historic Landmarks; Historic Resources of Georgetown MRA
6	Bowlen House		January 14, 1986 (#86000180)	1405 Forest; 30°37′53″N 97°40′44″W	Georgetown	Historic Resources of Georgetown MRA; house no longer present
7	Bryson Stage Coach Stop	Bryson Stage Coach Stop	December 1, 1978 (#78003000)	Northwest of Liberty Hill on TX 29; 30°40′40″N 97°56′37″W	Liberty Hill	Recorded Texas Historic Landmark
8	Burcham House	Burcham House	April 29, 1986 (#86000993)	1310 College; 30°37′54″N 97°40′19″W	Georgetown	Recorded Texas Historic Landmark; Historic Resources of Georgetown MRA
9	Casey House	Casey House	January 14, 1986 (#86000184)	705 E. Third; 30°38′27″N 97°40′12″W	Georgetown	Historic Resources of Georgetown MRA
10	Caswell House	Caswell House	April 29, 1986 (#86000994)	207 E. Ninth; 30°38′09″N 97°40′31″W	Georgetown	Historic Resources of Georgetown MRA
11	Chesser-Morgan House	Chesser-Morgan House	January 14, 1986 (#86000185)	1202 E. Fifteenth; 30°37′49″N 97°39′56″W	Georgetown	Part of Olive Street Historic District; Historic Resources of Georgetown MRA
12	Jesse and Sara Cooper House	Jesse and Sara Cooper House	February 16, 1996 (#96000073)	1.8 mi (2.9 km). east of Georgetown Hwy. 29; 30°38′32″N 97°38′48″W	Georgetown	Recorded Texas Historic Landmark; Historic Resources of Georgetown MRA
13	E. M. Daughtrey House		April 29, 1986 (#86000984)	1316 E. University; 30°37′58″N 97°39′47″W	Georgetown	Historic Resources of Georgetown MRA; Moved or demolished
14	Dr. James L. Dickey House	Dr. James L. Dickey House	February 21, 2017 (#100000675)	500 Burkett Rd. 30°34′20″N 97°24′18″W	Taylor	Destroyed by fire July 10, 2022
15	John J. Dimmitt House	John J. Dimmitt House	February 16, 1996 (#96000076)	W. University (TX 29) 0.5 mi. west of the junction with Austin Highway. 30°38′05″N 97°41′12″W	Georgetown	Recorded Texas Historic Landmark; Historic Resources of Georgetown MRA
16	S. A. Easley House	S. A. Easley House	April 29, 1986 (#86000983)	1310 Olive; 30°37′55″N 97°40′02″W	Georgetown	Recorded Texas Historic Landmark; part of Olive Street Historic District; Historic Resources of Georgetown MRA
17	First Methodist Church	First Methodist Church	June 17, 1986 (#86001368)	410 E. University; 30°37′58″N 97°40′23″W	Georgetown	Recorded Texas Historic Landmark; Historic Resources of Georgetown MRA
18	D. D. Fowler House	D. D. Fowler House	April 29, 1986 (#86000985)	1531 Ash; 30°37′45″N 97°40′21″W	Georgetown	Historic Resources of Georgetown MRA
19	Georgetown Light and Water Works	Georgetown Light and Water Works	February 16, 1996 (#96000074)	403 W. 9th 30°38′10″N 97°40′49″W	Georgetown	Historic Resources of Georgetown MRA
20	Harper-Chesser House	Harper-Chesser House	April 29, 1986 (#86000969)	1309 College; 30°37′54″N 97°40′17″W	Georgetown	Historic Resources of Georgetown MRA
21	Moses Harrell House	Moses Harrell House	January 14, 1986 (#86000169)	1001 Church; 30°38′04″N 97°40′32″W	Georgetown	Historic Resources of Georgetown MRA
22	E. M. Harris House	E. M. Harris House	January 14, 1986 (#86000168)	404 E. Seventh; 30°38′13″N 97°40′24″W	Georgetown	Historic Resources of Georgetown MRA
23	A. W. Hawnen House	A. W. Hawnen House	April 29, 1986 (#86000967)	1409 Olive; 30°37′54″N 97°39′59″W	Georgetown	Part of Olive Street Historic District; Historic Resources of Georgetown MRA
24	M. S. Hewitt House	M. S. Hewitt House	February 16, 1996 (#96000071)	1019 S. College; 30°38′01″N 97°40′24″W	Georgetown	Historic Resources of Georgetown MRA
25	House at 214 W. University	House at 214 W. University	April 29, 1986 (#86000987)	214 W. University; 30°37′58″N 97°40′41″W	Georgetown	Historic Resources of Georgetown MRA
26	House at 801 West	House at 801 West	January 14, 1986 (#86000172)	801 West; 30°38′10″N 97°40′52″W	Georgetown	Historic Resources of Georgetown MRA
27	House at 907 Pine	House at 907 Pine	January 14, 1986 (#86000171)	907 Pine; 30°38′09″N 97°40′11″W	Georgetown	Historic Resources of Georgetown MRA
28	Hutto Commercial Historic District	Hutto Commercial Historic District	August 4, 2011 (#11000515)	101-205 East St., 202 Farley St. & 204 US 79; 30°32′38″N 97°31′50″W	Hutto	
29	Dr. Robert Hyer House	Dr. Robert Hyer House	January 14, 1986 (#86000175)	904 Ash; 30°38′07″N 97°40′23″W	Georgetown	Historic Resources of Georgetown MRA
30	Imhoff House	Imhoff House	January 14, 1986 (#86000176)	208 Austin; 30°38′27″N 97°40′41″W	Georgetown	Historic Resources of Georgetown MRA
31	Inn at Brushy Creek	Inn at Brushy Creek	October 15, 1970 (#70000777)	Taylor Exit off U.S. 79, off I-35; 30°30′57″N 97°41′22″W	Round Rock	
32	George Irvine House	George Irvine House	April 29, 1986 (#86000973)	409 E. University; 30°38′00″N 97°40′24″W	Georgetown	Recorded Texas Historic Landmark; Historic Resources of Georgetown MRA
33	J. J. Johnson Farm		January 14, 1986 (#86000178)	Rabbitt Hill Rd. 30°34′59″N 97°40′18″W	Georgetown	Historic Resources of Georgetown MRA; house no longer present
34	Kenney's Fort Site (41WM465)	Kenney's Fort Site (41WM465)	April 20, 1987 (#87000565)	Address restricted	Round Rock	
35	Lane-Riley House	Lane-Riley House	April 29, 1986 (#86000975)	1302 College; 30°37′55″N 97°40′19″W	Georgetown	Recorded Texas Historic Landmark; Historic Resources of Georgetown MRA
36	Will and Mary Leake House	Will and Mary Leake House	April 29, 1986 (#86000976)	313 E. Seventh; 30°38′14″N 97°40′26″W	Georgetown	Historic Resources of Georgetown MRA
37	John Leavell House	John Leavell House	April 29, 1986 (#86000979)	803 College; 30°38′12″N 97°40′18″W	Georgetown	Historic Resources of Georgetown MRA
38	M. B. and Annie Lockett House	M. B. and Annie Lockett House	April 29, 1986 (#86000981)	811 E. University; 30°38′00″N 97°40′08″W	Georgetown	Historic Resources of Georgetown MRA
39	Frank and Mellie Love House	Frank and Mellie Love House	April 29, 1986 (#86000977)	1415 Ash; 30°37′50″N 97°40′20″W	Georgetown	Historic Resources of Georgetown MRA
40	W. K. and Kate Makemson House	W. K. and Kate Makemson House	January 14, 1986 (#86000190)	1002 Ash; 30°38′04″N 97°40′23″W	Georgetown	Historic Resources of Georgetown MRA
41	McFadin House	McFadin House	April 9, 1980 (#80004160)	North of Taylor; 30°38′18″N 97°25′33″W	Taylor	Recorded Texas Historic Landmark
42	McKnight-Ebb House		January 14, 1986 (#86000191)	502 W. Eighteenth; 30°37′34″N 97°40′53″W	Georgetown	Historic Resources of Georgetown MRA; Moved or demolished
43	McMurray House	McMurray House	January 14, 1986 (#86000192)	611 Church; 30°38′13″N 97°40′30″W	Georgetown	Historic Resources of Georgetown MRA
44	Capt. Nelson Merrell House	Capt. Nelson Merrell House	October 15, 1970 (#70000778)	Northeast of Round Rock on U.S. 79; 30°31′02″N 97°39′41″W	Round Rock	
45	Miller-Ellyson House	Miller-Ellyson House	January 14, 1986 (#86000193)	303 E. Ninth; 30°38′09″N 97°40′28″W	Georgetown	Historic Resources of Georgetown MRA
46	Old Georgetown High School	Old Georgetown High School	January 14, 1986 (#86000195)	507 E. University; 30°38′01″N 97°40′20″W	Georgetown	Recorded Texas Historic Landmark; Historic Resources of Georgetown MRA
47	Olive Street Historic District	Olive Street Historic District	August 20, 2013 (#13000615)	Olive St. between E. University Ave. & 17th St. plus a portion of E. 15th St. 30°37′51″N 97°40′01″W	Georgetown	Includes Recorded Texas Historic Landmarks; Historic Resources of Georgetown MRA
48	Paige-DeCrow-Weir House	Paige-DeCrow-Weir House	January 14, 1986 (#86000194)	I-35 and State Route 2243; 30°37′24″N 97°41′30″W	Georgetown	Recorded Texas Historic Landmark; Historic Resources of Georgetown MRA
49	Woodson and Margaret Patrick House	Woodson and Margaret Patrick House	January 14, 1986 (#86000197)	211 E. Fifth; 30°38′21″N 97°40′31″W	Georgetown	Historic Resources of Georgetown MRA
50	Pegues House	Pegues House	January 14, 1986 (#86000196)	904 E. University; 30°37′59″N 97°40′07″W	Georgetown	Historic Resources of Georgetown MRA
51	Preslar-Hewitt Building	Preslar-Hewitt Building	May 1, 2003 (#03000331)	321-323 N. Main; 30°34′13″N 97°24′35″W	Taylor	Recorded Texas Historic Landmark; part of Taylor Downtown Historic District
52	R. H. and Martha Price House	R. H. and Martha Price House	April 29, 1986 (#86000982)	209 E. Tenth; 30°38′05″N 97°40′31″W	Georgetown	Historic Resources of Georgetown MRA
53	Railroad Produce Depot	Railroad Produce Depot	November 7, 1979 (#79003024)	401 W. 6th St. 30°38′18″N 97°40′49″W	Georgetown	State Antiquities Landmark
54	J. H. Reedy House	J. H. Reedy House	April 29, 1986 (#86000949)	908 E. University; 30°37′59″N 97°40′06″W	Georgetown	Historic Resources of Georgetown MRA
55	Round Rock Commercial Historic District	Round Rock Commercial Historic District	June 9, 1983 (#83003170)	100 and 200 blocks of E. Main St. 30°30′30″N 97°40′39″W	Round Rock	Includes Recorded Texas Historic Landmarks
56	Round Rock Post Office and William M. Owen House	Round Rock Post Office and William M. Owen House	July 7, 1983 (#83003171)	Chisholm Trail and Emanuel St. 30°30′55″N 97°41′24″W	Round Rock	Recorded Texas Historic Landmark
57	Rouser House	Rouser House	January 14, 1986 (#86000198)	602 Myrtle; 30°38′16″N 97°40′30″W	Georgetown	Historic Resources of Georgetown MRA
58	Saint John's Methodist Church	Saint John's Methodist Church	April 29, 1986 (#86000950)	301 E University Ave; 30°38′01″N 97°40′29″W	Georgetown	Historic Resources of Georgetown MRA
59	Sansom-Schmalenbeck House		January 14, 1986 (#86000199)	813 Church; 30°38′09″N 97°40′32″W	Georgetown	Historic Resources of Georgetown MRA; Demolished or moved
60	Saxon Motor Car Store	Saxon Motor Car Store	June 17, 1986 (#86001366)	316 E. Sixth St. 30°38′17″N 97°40′27″W	Georgetown	Historic Resources of Georgetown MRA
61	A. W. Sillure House	A. W. Sillure House	April 29, 1986 (#86000951)	1414 Ash; 30°37′50″N 97°40′23″W	Georgetown	Recorded Texas Historic Landmark; Historic Resources of Georgetown MRA
62	Southwestern University Administration Building and Mood Hall	Southwestern University Administration Building and Mood Hall	April 23, 1975 (#75002013)	1001 E. University Ave., Southwestern University campus 30°38′00″N 97°40′01″W	Georgetown	Recorded Texas Historic Landmark
63	Robert and Lula Stone House	Robert and Lula Stone House	January 14, 1986 (#86000200)	1102 Ash; 30°38′01″N 97°40′23″W	Georgetown	Historic Resources of Georgetown MRA
64	Taylor Downtown Historic District	Taylor Downtown Historic District	October 26, 2005 (#05001193)	Roughly bounded by 5th, Washburn, 1st & Vance Sts. 30°34′16″N 97°24′36″W	Taylor	Includes Recorded Texas Historic Landmarks
65	Taylor High School Campus	Taylor High School Campus	May 17, 2018 (#100002437)	410 W. 7th St. 30°34′07″N 97°24′51″W	Taylor	
66	Taylor National Bank	Taylor National Bank	May 23, 1980 (#80004159)	200 Main St. 30°34′07″N 97°24′33″W	Taylor	Recorded Texas Historic Landmark; part of Taylor Downtown Historic District
67	Taylor-Cooper House	Taylor-Cooper House	January 14, 1986 (#86000203)	105 E 5th 30°38′22″N 97°40′36″W	Georgetown	Historic Resources of Georgetown MRA
68	Tinnen House	Tinnen House	August 25, 1970 (#70000776)	1220 Austin St. 30°37′53″N 97°40′37″W	Georgetown	Part of Belford Historic District
69	University Avenue-Elm Street Historic District	University Avenue-Elm Street Historic District	December 6, 1979 (#79003025)	E. University and Elm Sts. 30°37′44″N 97°40′18″W	Georgetown	Includes Recorded Texas Historic Landmarks
70	W. C. and Kate Vaden House	W. C. and Kate Vaden House	April 29, 1986 (#86000952)	711 E. University; 30°38′01″N 97°40′13″W	Georgetown	Recorded Texas Historic Landmark; Historic Resources of Georgetown MRA
71	Wesley Chapel A.M.E Church	Wesley Chapel A.M.E Church	January 14, 1986 (#86000204)	508 W. Fourth; 30°38′24″N 97°40′53″W	Georgetown	Recorded Texas Historic Landmark; Historic Resources of Georgetown MRA
72	D. K. and Inez Wilcox House	D. K. and Inez Wilcox House	April 29, 1986 (#86000954)	1307 Olive; 30°37′55″N 97°40′00″W	Georgetown	Part of Olive Street Historic District; Historic Resources of Georgetown MRA
73	Wilcox-Graves House	Wilcox-Graves House	April 29, 1986 (#86000953)	1403 Olive; 30°37′55″N 97°39′59″W	Georgetown	Part of Olive Street Historic District; Historic Resources of Georgetown MRA
74	Williamson County Courthouse Historic District	Williamson County Courthouse Historic District	July 26, 1977 (#77001480); April 29, 1986 boundary increase (#86000955)	Rock and 9th Sts., Main and 7th Sts. (includes both sides); 30°38′12″N 97°40′39″W	Georgetown	Includes State Antiquities Landmark, Recorded Texas Historic Landmarks; Historic Resources of Georgetown MRA (boundary increase)
75	Zidell House	Zidell House	May 12, 2009 (#09000308)	2015 W. Lake Dr. 30°34′33″N 97°25′53″W	Taylor	

== Former listings ==
	Name on the Register	Image	Date listed	Date removed	Location	City or town	Description
1	Grace Episcopal Church	Grace Episcopal Church	April 29, 1986 (#86000986)	February 17, 1999	811 S. Main St. 30°38′09″N 97°40′36″W	Georgetown	Historic Resources of Georgetown MRA; formerly located at 1314 E University while NRHP-listed

== See also ==
- National Register of Historic Places listings in Texas
- Recorded Texas Historic Landmarks in Williamson County
