= Saxon Motor Car Store =

- U.S. National Register of Historic Places
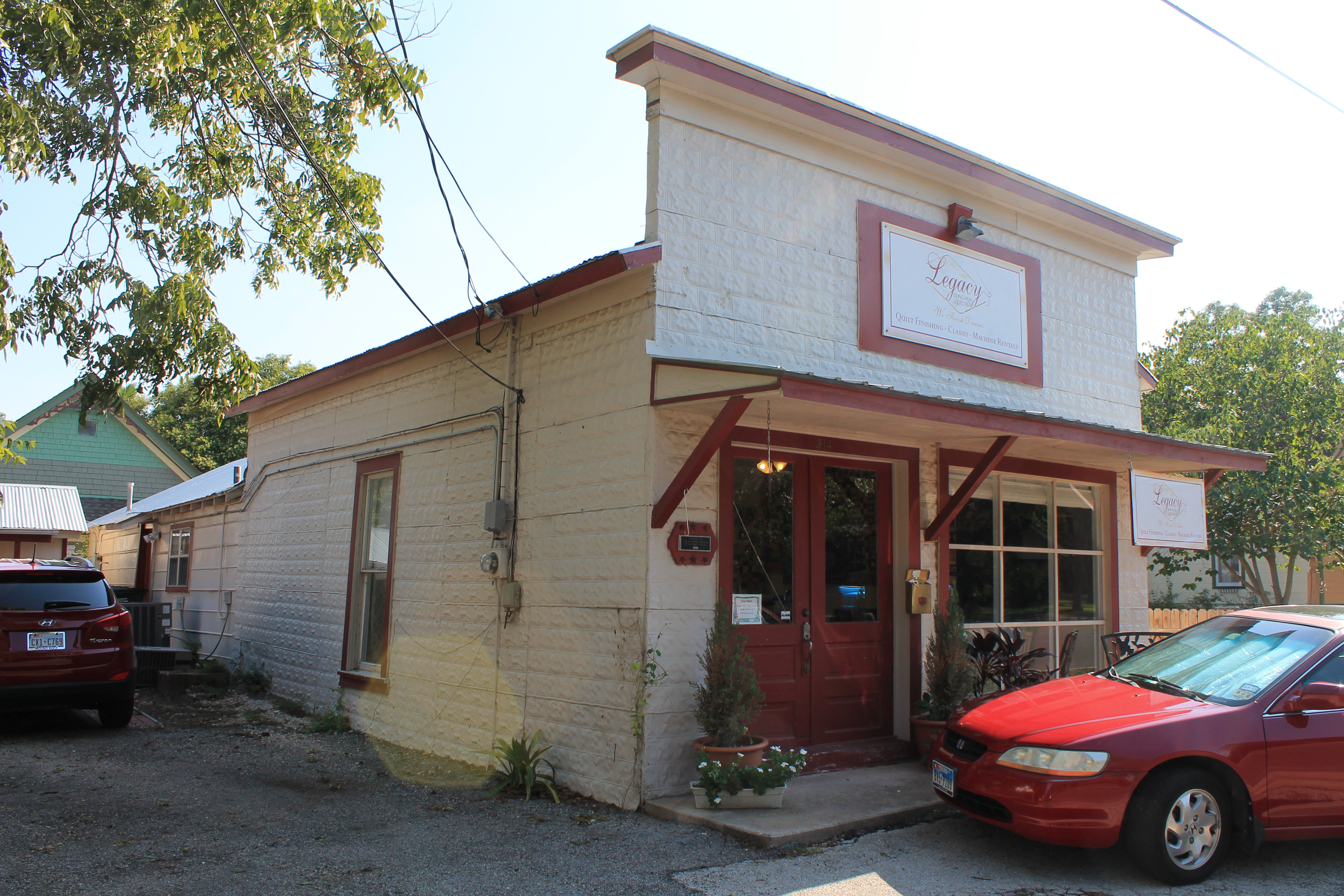

- Location within Texas Location within the United States
- Location: 316 E. Sixth St., Georgetown, Texas
- Coordinates: 30°38′17″N 97°40′27″W
- Area: less than one acre
- Built: 1920
- MPS: Georgetown MRA
- NRHP reference No.: 86001366
- Added to NRHP: June 17, 1986

The Saxon Motor Car Store, at 316 E. Sixth St. in Georgetown, Texas, was built in 1920. It was listed on the National Register of Historic Places in 1986.

It is a wood frame commercial building.
