= National Register of Historic Places listings in the Central region of Texas: Bell, Coryell and Lampasas counties =

This page is one of two listing the National Register of Historic Places listings in Texas's Central region.

The Central region is an area of 20 counties defined by the Texas Comptroller for economic reporting in 2022, as mapped here. The region included 2020 population of 1.3 million, or 4.3 percent of Texas's population, with Bell County having about 30 percent of Central's population. Bell County, along with Coryell and Lampasas counties, is part of the Killeen–Temple–Fort Hood metropolitan area, a MSA.

This page covers Bell, Coryell, and Lampasas counties only, the three that make up the Killeen–Temple–Fort Hood metropolitan area. As of the 2020 census, the MSA had a population of 475,367. The area is sometimes called the "Centroplex", akin to the Dallas-Fort Worth metroplex.

For the other 17, please see this.

To see all locations together in a map, click on "Map all coordinates using OpenSourceMap" at right.

== Bell County ==
1

	Name on the Register	Image	Date listed	Location	City or town	Description
1	Anderson House and Store	Anderson House and Store	April 5, 1983 (#83003076)	Main St. 30°56′46″N 97°32′12″W	Salado	Recorded Texas Historic Landmark; Historic Resources of Salado MRA
2	Armstrong-Adams House	Armstrong-Adams House	April 5, 1983 (#83003077)	Main St. and Thomas Arnold Rd. 30°56′49″N 97°32′14″W	Salado	Recorded Texas Historic Landmark; Historic Resources of Salado MRA
3	F. K. and Mary Austin House	F. K. and Mary Austin House	December 26, 1990 (#90001891)	702 N. Penelope St. 31°03′44″N 97°27′35″W	Belton	Historic and Architectural Resources of Belton MPS
4	Ele Baggett House	Ele Baggett House	December 26, 1990 (#90001882)	1019 N. Main St. 31°03′57″N 97°27′36″W	Belton	Recorded Texas Historic Landmark; Historic and Architectural Resources of Belton MPS
5	Silas and Ellen Baggett House	Silas and Ellen Baggett House	December 26, 1990 (#90001881)	1018 N. Main St. 31°03′58″N 97°27′38″W	Belton	Historic and Architectural Resources of Belton MPS
6	George Washington Baines House	George Washington Baines House	April 5, 1983 (#83003078)	316 Royal St. 30°56′31″N 97°31′59″W	Salado	Recorded Texas Historic Landmark; Historic Resources of Salado MRA
7	Barbee-Berry Mercantile Building	Barbee-Berry Mercantile Building	August 22, 1984 (#84001571)	Main and Royal St. 30°56′35″N 97°32′13″W	Salado	Historic Resources of Salado MRA
8	Barclay-Bryan House	Barclay-Bryan House	May 10, 1984 (#84001572)	804 S. 25th St. 31°05′32″N 97°21′28″W	Temple	
9	Bartlett Commercial Historic District	Bartlett Commercial Historic District	September 30, 1980 (#80004076)	E. Clark St. 30°47′42″N 97°25′37″W	Bartlett	Extends into Williamson County
10	Barton House	Barton House	April 5, 1983 (#83003079)	Main St. 30°56′51″N 97°32′07″W	Salado	Historic Resources of Salado MRA
11	Baylor Female College Historic District	Baylor Female College Historic District	December 26, 1990 (#90001869)	Bounded by King, College and W. Ninth Sts. 31°04′01″N 97°27′50″W	Belton	Includes Recorded Texas Historic Landmark; Historic and Architectural Resources of Belton MPS
12	William Beamer House	William Beamer House	December 26, 1990 (#90001875)	1202 S. Beal St. 31°02′41″N 97°27′52″W	Belton	Historic and Architectural Resources of Belton MPS
13	Bell County Courthouse	Bell County Courthouse	December 12, 1976 (#76002004)	Public Sq. 31°03′21″N 97°27′49″W	Belton	State Antiquities Landmark, Recorded Texas Historic Landmark; part of Belton Commercial Historic District
14	Belton Academy	Belton Academy	December 26, 1990 (#90001937)	404 E. Ninth St. 31°03′49″N 97°27′28″W	Belton	Recorded Texas Historic Landmark; Historic and Architectural Resources of Belton MPS; also called Charles Wedemeyer House
15	Belton Commercial Historic District	Belton Commercial Historic District	December 26, 1990 (#90001868)	Roughly bounded by Nolan Valley Rd., Penelope St. and Nolan Cr.. 31°03′23″N 97°27′45″W	Belton	Includes State Antiquities Landmark, Recorded Texas Historic Landmarks; Historic and Architectural Resources of Belton MPS
16	Belton Farmers' Gin Coop	Belton Farmers' Gin Coop	December 26, 1990 (#90001870)	219 S. East Ave., Building 4; 31°03′18″N 97°27′45″W	Belton	Recorded Texas Historic Landmark; Historic and Architectural Resources of Belton MPS
17	Belton Standpipe	Belton Standpipe	December 26, 1990 (#90001900)	NW of jct. of TX 317 & I-35; 31°02′58″N 97°28′12″W	Belton	Historic and Architectural Resources of Belton MPS
18	Belton Yarn Mill	Belton Yarn Mill	December 26, 1990 (#90001899)	805 E. Fourth St. 31°03′28″N 97°27′14″W	Belton	Historic and Architectural Resources of Belton MPS
19	T. Hamp and Beulah Birdwell House	T. Hamp and Beulah Birdwell House	December 26, 1990 (#90001896)	503 N. Wall; 31°03′37″N 97°27′32″W	Belton	Historic and Architectural Resources of Belton MPS
20	R. F. and Lena Burford House	R. F. and Lena Burford House	December 26, 1990 (#90001893)	920 N. Penelope St. 31°03′01″N 97°27′33″W	Belton	Historic and Architectural Resources of Belton MPS
21	Carnegie Public Library	Carnegie Public Library	March 4, 1985 (#85000473)	201 N. Main St. 31°03′27″N 97°27′48″W	Belton	Recorded Texas Historic Landmark; part of Belton Commercial Historic District
22	Cornelison House	Cornelison House	December 26, 1990 (#90001886)	1102 N. Pearl St. 31°04′01″N 97°27′41″W	Belton	Historic and Architectural Resources of Belton MPS
23	Davis House	Davis House	April 5, 1983 (#83003080)	Main St. 30°56′41″N 97°32′11″W	Salado	Historic Resources of Salado MRA
24	Joel Elliott House	Joel Elliott House	December 26, 1990 (#90001876)	716 N. College St. 31°03′50″N 97°27′51″W	Belton	Historic and Architectural Resources of Belton MPS
25	Ferguson House	Ferguson House	December 8, 1978 (#78002888)	518 N. 7th St. 31°06′12″N 97°20′36″W	Temple	Recorded Texas Historic Landmark
26	James A. Ferguson House	James A. Ferguson House	December 26, 1990 (#90001874)	1123 N. Beal St. 31°03′57″N 97°27′19″W	Belton	Historic and Architectural Resources of Belton MPS
27	James E. and Miriam Ferguson House	James E. and Miriam Ferguson House	December 26, 1990 (#90001889)	604 N. Penelope St. 31°03′41″N 97°27′37″W	Belton	Historic and Architectural Resources of Belton MPS
28	First Christian Church Parsonage	First Christian Church Parsonage	December 26, 1990 (#90001890)	608 N. Penelope St. 31°03′43″N 97°27′36″W	Belton	Historic and Architectural Resources of Belton MPS
29	Fowler House	Fowler House	April 5, 1983 (#83003081)	Main St. 30°57′30″N 97°31′58″W	Salado	Recorded Texas Historic Landmark; Historic Resources of Salado MRA
30	Dr. Jacob Moore Frazier House	Dr. Jacob Moore Frazier House	December 26, 1990 (#90001897)	618 N. Wall; 31°03′42″N 97°27′32″W	Belton	Historic and Architectural Resources of Belton MPS
31	Gault Archaeological Site	Gault Archaeological Site	May 29, 2018 (#100002469)	Address Restricted	Florence	
32	Gray Rental Houses	Gray Rental Houses	December 26, 1990 (#90001934)	702-708 N. Pearl St. 31°03′48″N 97°27′46″W	Belton	Historic and Architectural Resources of Belton MPS
33	Capt. Robert Halley House	Capt. Robert Halley House	April 5, 1983 (#83003082)	Main St. 30°57′15″N 97°31′57″W	Salado	Recorded Texas Historic Landmark; Historic Resources of Salado MRA
34	John P. Hammersmith House	John P. Hammersmith House	December 26, 1990 (#90001883)	520 S. Main St. 31°03′10″N 97°27′56″W	Belton	Recorded Texas Historic Landmark; Historic and Architectural Resources of Belton MPS; also called Clark House
35	Capt. Andrew Jackson Harris House	Capt. Andrew Jackson Harris House	December 26, 1990 (#90001871)	1001 W. Tenth Ave. 31°04′02″N 97°28′09″W	Belton	Recorded Texas Historic Landmark; Historic and Architectural Resources of Belton MPS
36	Hendrickson-Caskey House	Hendrickson-Caskey House	February 10, 1995 (#95000054)	Center Circle; 30°56′42″N 97°31′54″W	Salado	Historic Resources of Salado MRA
37	High View		December 29, 2020 (#100005990)	731 Wolf St. 31°06′46″N 97°44′15″W	Killeen	
38	House at 402 N. East St.		December 26, 1990 (#90001878)	402 N. East St. 31°03′33″N 97°27′44″W	Belton	Historic and Architectural Resources of Belton MPS; House demolished or moved
39	House at 730 N. Beal St.	House at 730 N. Beal St.	December 26, 1990 (#90001936)	730 N. Beal St. 31°03′45″N 97°27′26″W	Belton	Historic and Architectural Resources of Belton MPS
40	Dr. Taylor Hudson House	Dr. Taylor Hudson House	December 26, 1990 (#90001879)	324 N. Main St. 31°03′33″N 97°27′48″W	Belton	Historic and Architectural Resources of Belton MPS
41	James House		December 26, 1990 (#90001873)	805 N. Beal St. 31°03′48″N 97°27′22″W	Belton	Historic and Architectural Resources of Belton MPS
42	Killeen Downtown Historic District	Killeen Downtown Historic District	March 31, 2014 (#14000098)	Roughly bounded by Avenue A, Santa Fe Plaza, North 4th & North 8th Streets; 31°07′19″N 97°43′38″W	Killeen	
43	Killeen High School	Killeen High School	May 18, 2015 (#15000244)	101 North College Street; 31°07′16″N 97°44′00″W	Killeen	Recorded Texas Historic Landmark
44	L. B. Kinchion House	L. B. Kinchion House	December 26, 1990 (#90001887)	702 S. Pearl St. 31°03′04″N 97°27′58″W	Belton	Historic and Architectural Resources of Belton MPS
45	Kyle Hotel	Kyle Hotel	August 5, 1993 (#93000772)	111 Main St. 31°05′54″N 97°20′26″W	Temple	Part of Temple Commercial Historic District
46	Walter J. Lee House		December 26, 1990 (#90001877)	804 N. College St. 31°03′52″N 97°27′49″W	Belton	Historic and Architectural Resources of Belton MPS; House demolished or moved
47	George and Martha McWhirter House	George and Martha McWhirter House	December 26, 1990 (#90001884)	400 N. Pearl St. 31°03′36″N 97°27′50″W	Belton	Historic and Architectural Resources of Belton MPS
48	V. R. Means House	V. R. Means House	December 26, 1990 (#90001938)	609 E. 14th St. 31°04′04″N 97°27′05″W	Belton	Historic and Architectural Resources of Belton MPS
49	J. Z. Miller House		December 26, 1990 (#90001892)	804 N. Penelope St. 31°03′47″N 97°27′33″W	Belton	Historic and Architectural Resources of Belton MPS
50	Miller-Curtis House	Miller-Curtis House	April 7, 1983 (#83003083)	1004 N. Main St. 31°03′56″N 97°27′38″W	Belton	Recorded Texas Historic Landmark; also called Curtis Mansion
51	Missouri, Kansas & Texas Railroad Bridge at the Leon River		December 26, 1990 (#90001898)	Across the Leon R. at Taylor's Valley Rd. 31°03′44″N 97°26′35″W	Belton	Historic and Architectural Resources of Belton MPS
52	Missouri, Kansas and Texas (MK&T-Katy) Railway Passenger Depot	Missouri, Kansas and Texas (MK&T-Katy) Railway Passenger Depot	December 26, 1990 (#100007401)	620 Central Ave. 31°05′43″N 97°20′02″W	Temple	
53	Morey House	Morey House	December 26, 1990 (#90001880)	328 N. Main St. 31°03′33″N 97°27′47″W	Belton	Historic and Architectural Resources of Belton MPS
54	Mount Zion United Methodist Church	Mount Zion United Methodist Church	December 26, 1990 (#90001872)	218 Alexander St. 31°03′35″N 97°27′57″W	Belton	Historic and Architectural Resources of Belton MPS
55	Robert Naismith House		December 26, 1990 (#90001888)	440 N. Penelope St. 31°03′36″N 97°27′39″W	Belton	Historic and Architectural Resources of Belton MPS; House demolished or moved
56	Norton-Orgain House	Norton-Orgain House	March 25, 1992 (#92000185)	Main St. 30°56′50″N 97°32′11″W	Salado	Recorded Texas Historic Landmark; Historic Resources of Salado MRA
57	Old St. Luke's Episcopal Church	Old St. Luke's Episcopal Church	January 17, 1974 (#74002056)	438 N. Wall St. 31°03′36″N 97°27′33″W	Belton	
58	Arthur Potts House	Arthur Potts House	December 26, 1990 (#90001895)	445 N. Wall; 31°03′35″N 97°27′33″W	Belton	Historic and Architectural Resources of Belton MPS
59	Col. Elijah Sterling Clack Robertson Plantation	Col. Elijah Sterling Clack Robertson Plantation	April 5, 1983 (#83003084)	I-35; 30°56′32″N 97°32′34″W	Salado	Recorded Texas Historic Landmark; Historic Resources of Salado MRA
60	Maj. A. J. Rose House	Maj. A. J. Rose House	May 22, 1978 (#78002887)	Wm. Rose Way and Royal St. 30°56′26″N 97°31′46″W	Salado	Recorded Texas Historic Landmark
61	Salado College Archeological Site	Salado College Archeological Site	March 1, 1985 (#85000403)	Main St & College Hill; 30°56′30″N 97°32′14″W	Salado	Historic Resources of Salado MRA; Smithsonian trinomial 41BL241
62	Salado United Methodist Church	Salado United Methodist Church	August 22, 1984 (#84001573)	Off Royal St. 30°56′30″N 97°31′44″W	Salado	Recorded Texas Historic Landmark; Historic Resources of Salado MRA; built in 1890; moved from its original location in 2005.
63	Stagecoach Inn	Stagecoach Inn	April 5, 1983 (#83003085); October 10, 2017 boundary increase (#100001721)	Main and Front Sts.; also 401 S. Stagecoach Rd. 30°56′31″N 97°32′15″W	Salado	Recorded Texas Historic Landmark; Historic Resources of Salado MRA; second set of addresses represent a boundary increase approved October 10, 2017.
64	State Highway 53 Bridge at the Leon River	State Highway 53 Bridge at the Leon River	October 10, 1996 (#96001119)	FM 817, 2.5 mi (4.0 km). E of jct. with FM 93; 31°03′59″N 97°26′33″W	Belton	Historic Bridges of Texas, 1866-1945 MPS
65	Temple Commercial Historic District	Temple Commercial Historic District	October 28, 2005 (#05001192)	Roughly bounded by French Av., 3rd St., Av. D & 6th St. 31°05′53″N 97°20′28″W	Temple	Includes Recorded Texas Historic Landmarks
66	Levi Tenney House	Levi Tenney House	April 5, 1983 (#83003086)	Pace Park Dr. 30°56′49″N 97°32′08″W	Salado	Historic Resources of Salado MRA
67	Twelve Oaks	Twelve Oaks	April 5, 1983 (#83003088)	Center Cirlce; 30°56′45″N 97°31′55″W	Salado	Recorded Texas Historic Landmark; Historic Resources of Salado MRA
68	Tyler House	Tyler House	April 5, 1983 (#83003087)	Main St. 30°56′45″N 97°32′15″W	Salado	Historic Resources of Salado MRA
69	W. J. Venable House		December 26, 1990 (#90001894)	426 N. Wall; 31°03′32″N 97°27′34″W	Belton	Historic and Architectural Resources of Belton MPS; House demolished or moved
70	Vickrey House	Vickrey House	April 5, 1983 (#83003089)	Main St. 30°57′04″N 97°32′11″W	Salado	Recorded Texas Historic Landmark; Historic Resources of Salado MRA
71	H. A. and Helena Ware House	H. A. and Helena Ware House	December 26, 1990 (#90001885)	401 N. Pearl St. 31°03′35″N 97°27′48″W	Belton	Historic and Architectural Resources of Belton MPS
72	White-Aiken House	White-Aiken House	April 5, 1983 (#83003090)	I-35; 30°57′36″N 97°31′58″W	Salado	Historic Resources of Salado MRA
73	Ralph and Sunny Wilson Sr. House	Ralph and Sunny Wilson Sr. House	November 25, 1998 (#98001374)	1714 S. 61st. St. 31°05′17″N 97°22′50″W	Temple	

==[[National Register of Historic Places listings in Bosque County, Texas|Bosque County]]== 2 {{:National Register of Historic Places listings in Bosque County, Texas}} ==[[National Register of Historic Places listings in Brazos County, Texas|Brazos County]]== 3 {{:National Register of Historic Places listings in Brazos County, Texas}} ==[[National Register of Historic Places listings in Burleson County, Texas|Burleson County]]== 4 {{:National Register of Historic Places listings in Burleson County, Texas}}

== Coryell County ==
5

	Name on the Register	Image	Date listed	Location	City or town	Description
1	Copperas Cove Stagestop and Post Office	Copperas Cove Stagestop and Post Office	September 26, 1979 (#79002928)	1.6 mi. SW of Copperas Cove off U.S. 190; 31°06′15″N 97°55′44″W	Copperas Cove	State Antiquities Landmark; known as Ogletree Stagestop and Post Office; built in 1878
2	Coryell County Courthouse	Coryell County Courthouse	August 18, 1977 (#77001435)	Bounded by 6th, 7th, Main and Leon Streets; 31°26′04″N 97°45′01″W	Gatesville	State Antiquities Landmark; Italian Renaissance Revival style building completed in 1898
3	Leon Street Bridge at the Leon River	Leon Street Bridge at the Leon River	February 28, 2017 (#100000694)	Leon St. at Leon R. 31°25′58″N 97°45′42″W	Gatesville	Recorded Texas Historic Landmark
4	Mother Neff State Park and F. A. S. 21-B(1) Historic District	Mother Neff State Park and F. A. S. 21-B(1) Historic District	October 2, 1992 (#92001303)	Jct. of TX 236 and the Leon R. 31°18′57″N 97°28′18″W	Moody	First park in the Texas state park system; Many CCC structures in the park

==[[National Register of Historic Places listings in Falls County, Texas|Falls County]]== 6 {{:National Register of Historic Places listings in Falls County, Texas}} ==[[National Register of Historic Places listings in Freestone County, Texas|Freestone County]]== 7 {{:National Register of Historic Places listings in Freestone County, Texas}} ==[[National Register of Historic Places listings in Grimes County, Texas|Grimes County]]== 8 {{:National Register of Historic Places listings in Grimes County, Texas}} ==[[National Register of Historic Places listings in Hamilton County, Texas|Hamilton County]]== 9 {{:National Register of Historic Places listings in Hamilton County, Texas}} ==[[National Register of Historic Places listings in Hill County, Texas|Hill County]]== 10 {{:National Register of Historic Places listings in Hill County, Texas}}

== Lampasas County ==
	Name on the Register	Image	Date listed	Location	City or town	Description
1	Lampasas Colored School	Lampasas Colored School	April 24, 2002 (#02000404)	514 College St. 31°03′53″N 98°10′23″W	Lampasas	Recorded Texas Historic Landmark
2	Lampasas County Courthouse	Lampasas County Courthouse	June 21, 1971 (#71000944)	Bounded by S. Live Oak, E. 4th, S. Pecan, and E. 3rd Sts. 31°03′56″N 98°10′40″W	Lampasas	State Antiquities Landmark, Recorded Texas Historic Landmark, part of Lampasas Downtown Historic District
3	Lampasas Downtown Historic District	Lampasas Downtown Historic District	January 28, 2004 (#03001540)	Roughly bounded by Second St., Pecan St., Fourth St. and Chestnut St. 31°04′03″N 98°10′45″W	Lampasas	Includes State Antiquities Landmark, multiple Recorded Texas Historic Landmarks
4	Markward Homestead	Markward Homestead	October 11, 2016 (#16000719)	101 East FM 580; 31°05′00″N 98°10′02″W	Lampasas	
5	Phillips and Trosper Buildings	Phillips and Trosper Buildings	April 30, 1987 (#87000676)	408 and 410 E. Third St. 31°03′56″N 98°10′42″W	Lampasas	Recorded Texas Historic Landmark, part of Lampasas Downtown Historic District
6	US 190 Bridge at the Colorado River	US 190 Bridge at the Colorado River	October 10, 1996 (#96001125)	US 190 at the Lampasas and San Saba Cnty. line 31°13′04″N 98°33′50″W	Lometa	

== [[National Register of Historic Places listings in Leon County, Texas|Leon County]]== {{:National Register of Historic Places listings in Leon County, Texas}} ==[[National Register of Historic Places listings in Limestone County, Texas|Limestone County]]== {{:National Register of Historic Places listings in Limestone County, Texas}} ==[[National Register of Historic Places listings in Madison County, Texas|Madison County]]== {{:National Register of Historic Places listings in Madison County, Texas}} ==[[National Register of Historic Places listings in McLennan County, Texas|McLennan County]]== 15 {{:National Register of Historic Places listings in McLennan County, Texas}} ==[[National Register of Historic Places listings in Milam County, Texas|Milam County]]== {{:National Register of Historic Places listings in Milam County, Texas}} ==[[National Register of Historic Places listings in Mills County, Texas|Mills County]]== {{:National Register of Historic Places listings in Mills County, Texas}} ==[[National Register of Historic Places listings in Robertson County, Texas|Robertson County]]== {{:National Register of Historic Places listings in Robertson County, Texas}} ==[[National Register of Historic Places listings in San Saba County, Texas|San Saba County]]== {{:National Register of Historic Places listings in San Saba County, Texas}} ==[[National Register of Historic Places listings in Washington County, Texas|Washington County]]== 20 {{:National Register of Historic Places listings in Washington County, Texas}}
