= Richard Foster Jones =

American academci (1886–1965)

- Born: July 7, 1886; Salado, Texas, US
- Died: September 12, 1965 (aged 79)

Academic background
- Education: UT Austin (BA); Columbia University (MA, PhD)

Academic work
- Discipline: English literature
- Sub-discipline: Early modern English literature
- Institutions: Washington University; Stanford University

Richard Foster Jones (July 7, 1886 – September 12, 1965) was a professor of English at Stanford University, and executive head of the university's English department. His research interests included early modern English literature (especially Sir Francis Bacon), the history of science, and the writings of Jonathan Swift.

== Life ==
Born in Salado, Texas, he was the son of Samuel J. Jones, who had been the head of Salado College before it closed, and who then established in its former building the Thomas Arnold High School, a private academy which he headed from 1890 until 1913.

Following his graduation from his father's school, Jones attended the University of Texas at Austin, from which he received a bachelor's degree in 1907. He then went to Columbia University, where he received a master's degree, and a doctorate in 1918. Jones joined the faculty of Washington University in St. Louis in 1919 and remained at that school until 1945, by which time he had risen to the position of Dean of the Graduate School. He retired from teaching in 1952 but continued his research and publishing until near the end of his life.

Though Jones spent only the last seven years of his academic career at Stanford, his name is closely associated with it. Stanford's Jones Room, a meeting and reading room for students in Stanford's creative writing program, is named for both Richard Foster Jones, who established the program, and his brother, Dr. E. H. Jones, who financed the program's establishment and whose E. H. Jones Endowment has been the primary source of the grants provided to recipients of the program's Stegner Fellowships.

== Works ==
- Ancients and Moderns: A Study of the Rise of the Scientific Movement in Seventeenth-Century England, St. Louis: Washington University Studies, 1936. Second edition, 1961.
- Ancients and Moderns: A Study of the Background of The Battle of the Books. St. Louis: Washington University Studies, 1936.
- Bacon, Francis. Essays, Advancement of Learning, New Atlantis and Other Pieces. New York: Odyssey Press, 1937, editor
- The Seventeenth Century: Studies in the History of English Thought and Literature from Bacon to Pope. Stanford University Press, 1951, (with others)
- Triumph of the English Language. Stanford University Press, 1953.
