= Norton-Orgain House =

Historic house in Texas, US

- U.S. National Register of Historic Places
- Recorded Texas Historic Landmark
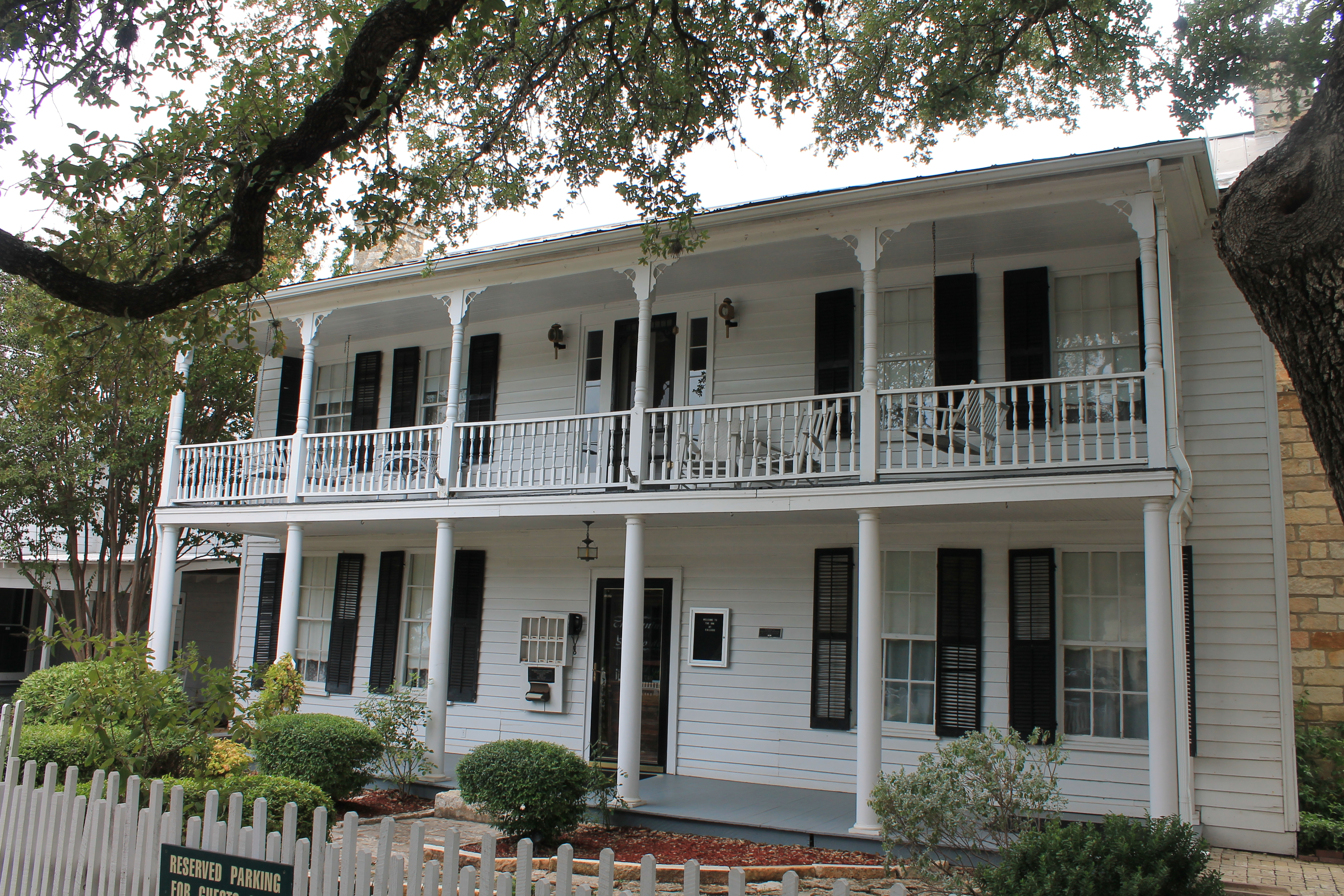
- The Norton-Orgain House in 2012

- Location within Texas
- Coordinates: 30.947222°N 97.536389°W
- NRHP reference No.: 1. 92000185
- Added to NRHP: March 25, 1992

The Norton-Orgain House is a historic house in Salado, Texas, United States.

== History ==
The Norton-Orgain House was built in 1872 by R. A. Buckles. In 1873, he sold it to Nimrod Lindsay Norton. In 1882, Norton sold the house to John and Kate Alma Orgain, both prominent educators in Salado. The house was also used as a boardinghouse and inn at times. It was listed on the National Register of Historic Places on March 25, 1992, and was listed as a Recorded Texas Historic Landmark in 1992.

== See also ==
- List of Recorded Texas Historic Landmarks (Anderson-Callahan)
- National Register of Historic Places listings in Bell County, Texas
