= Salado United Methodist Church =

Historic church in Texas, United States

- U.S. National Register of Historic Places
- Recorded Texas Historic Landmark
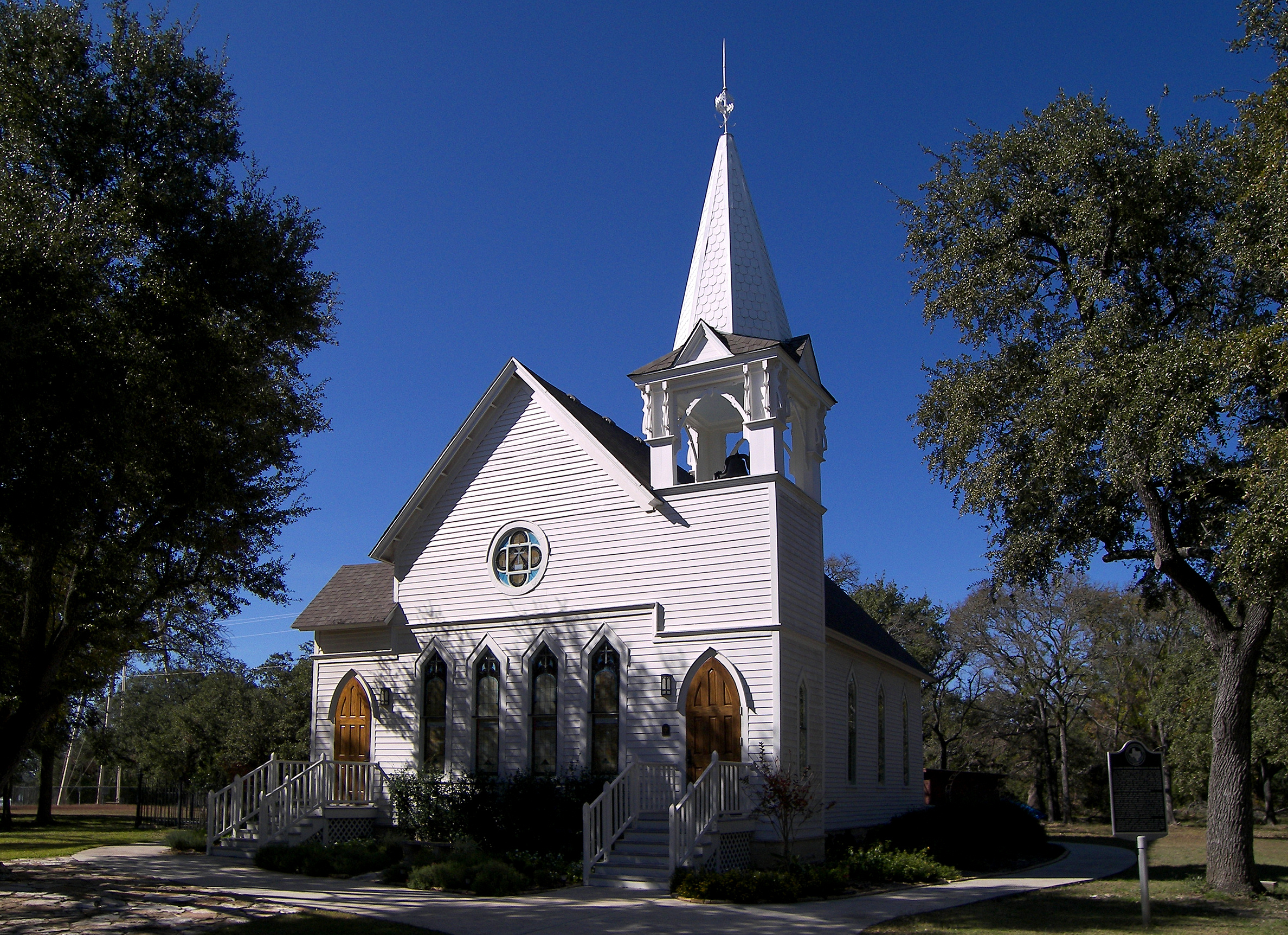
- Salado Methodist Church in 2008

- Location within Texas Location within the United States
- Location: Thomas Arnold Rd. and Church St., Salado, Texas
- Coordinates: 30°56′50″N 97°32′16″W
- Area: less than one acre
- Built: 1890
- Architectural style: Gothic, Carpenter Gothic
- MPS: Salado MRA
- NRHP reference No.: 84001573
- RTHL No.: 4494

Significant dates
- Added to NRHP: August 22, 1984
- Designated RTHL: 1969

Salado United Methodist Church is a historic church at Thomas Arnold Road and Church Street in Salado, Texas.

It was built in 1890 and added to the National Register of Historic Places in 1984.

== See also ==
- National Register of Historic Places listings in Bell County, Texas
- Recorded Texas Historic Landmarks in Bell County
