= Barton House (Salado, Texas) =

Historic house in Texas, United States

- U.S. National Register of Historic Places
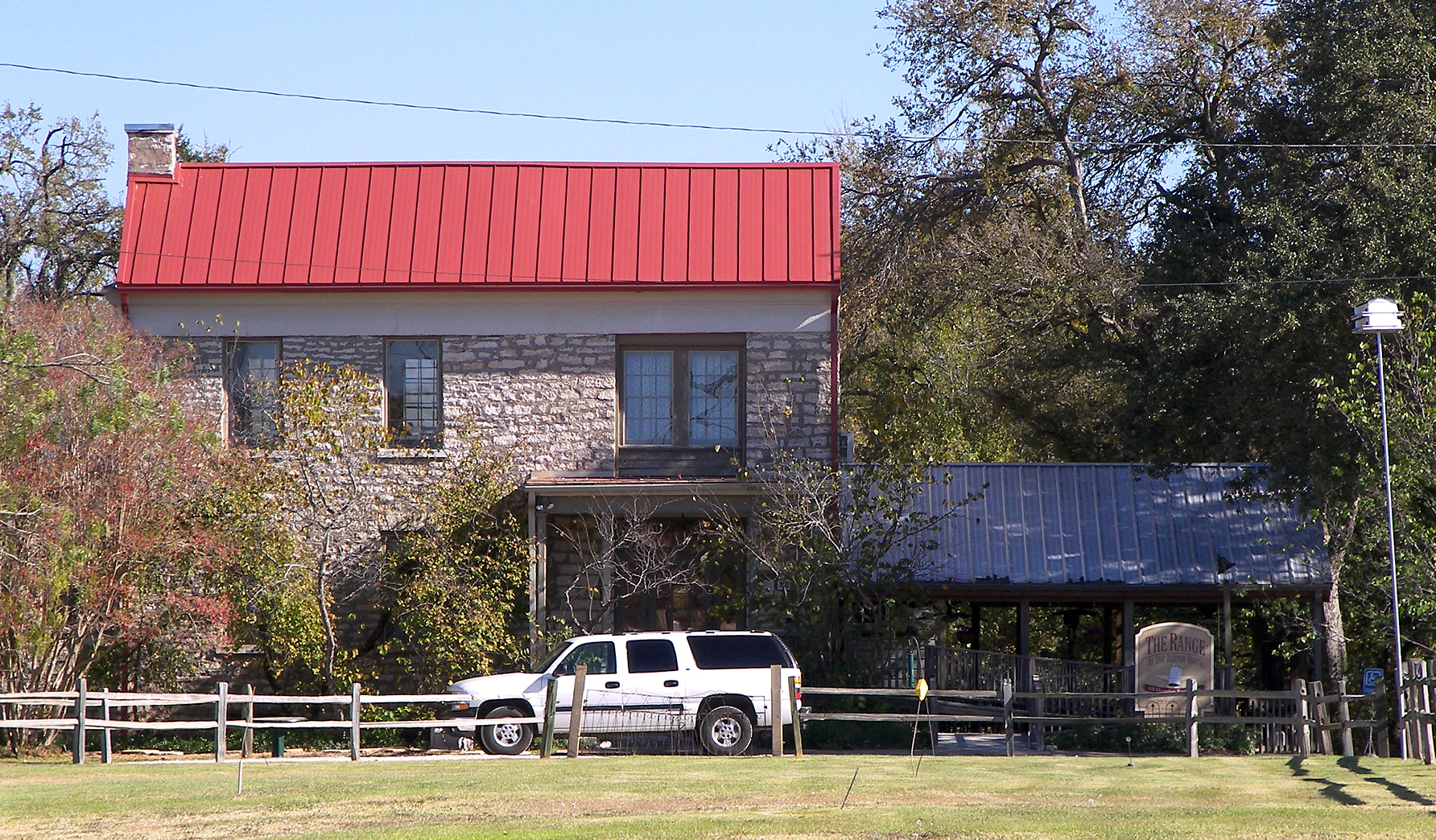
- Barton House in 2008

- Location within Texas Location within the United States
- Location: Main St., Salado, Texas
- Coordinates: 30°56′51″N 97°32′7″W
- Area: less than one acre
- Built: 1866
- Built by: John Hendrickson
- MPS: Salado MRA
- NRHP reference No.: 83003079
- Added to NRHP: April 5, 1983

The Barton House in Salado, Texas was built in 1866. It was listed on the National Register of Historic Places in 1983.

It is a stone house made of quarry-faced limestone ashlar, built into a hillside. It was built as a home for an early doctor in early Salado. It shows skill in stonemasonry and is unusual for its period in its asymmetrical placement of door and its having a wing.

It was listed as part of a group nomination of Salado-area historic resources.

== See also ==
- National Register of Historic Places listings in Bell County, Texas
