= National Register of Historic Places listings in Bell County, Texas =

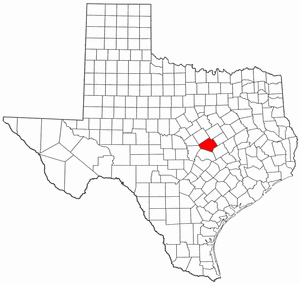
Location of Bell County in Texas

This is a list of the National Register of Historic Places listings in Bell County, Texas.

This is intended to be a complete list of properties and districts listed on the National Register of Historic Places in Bell County, Texas. There are four districts, 66 individual properties, and one former property listed on the National Register in the county. The individually listed properties include 23 that are designated or contain Recorded Texas Historic Landmarks including one that is also a State Antiquities Landmark. Two districts contain several more Recorded Texas Historic Landmarks.

This National Park Service list is complete through NPS recent listings posted August 1, 2025.

== Current listings ==
The locations of National Register properties and districts may be seen in a mapping service provided.

	Name on the Register	Image	Date listed	Location	City or town	Description
1	Anderson House and Store	Anderson House and Store	April 5, 1983 (#83003076)	Main St. 30°56′46″N 97°32′12″W	Salado	Recorded Texas Historic Landmark; Historic Resources of Salado MRA
2	Armstrong-Adams House	Armstrong-Adams House	April 5, 1983 (#83003077)	Main St. and Thomas Arnold Rd. 30°56′49″N 97°32′14″W	Salado	Recorded Texas Historic Landmark; Historic Resources of Salado MRA
3	F. K. and Mary Austin House	F. K. and Mary Austin House	December 26, 1990 (#90001891)	702 N. Penelope St. 31°03′44″N 97°27′35″W	Belton	Historic and Architectural Resources of Belton MPS
4	Ele Baggett House	Ele Baggett House	December 26, 1990 (#90001882)	1019 N. Main St. 31°03′57″N 97°27′36″W	Belton	Recorded Texas Historic Landmark; Historic and Architectural Resources of Belton MPS
5	Silas and Ellen Baggett House	Silas and Ellen Baggett House	December 26, 1990 (#90001881)	1018 N. Main St. 31°03′58″N 97°27′38″W	Belton	Historic and Architectural Resources of Belton MPS
6	George Washington Baines House	George Washington Baines House	April 5, 1983 (#83003078)	316 Royal St. 30°56′31″N 97°31′59″W	Salado	Recorded Texas Historic Landmark; Historic Resources of Salado MRA
7	Barbee-Berry Mercantile Building	Barbee-Berry Mercantile Building	August 22, 1984 (#84001571)	Main and Royal St. 30°56′35″N 97°32′13″W	Salado	Historic Resources of Salado MRA
8	Barclay-Bryan House	Barclay-Bryan House	May 10, 1984 (#84001572)	804 S. 25th St. 31°05′32″N 97°21′28″W	Temple	
9	Bartlett Commercial Historic District	Bartlett Commercial Historic District	September 30, 1980 (#80004076)	E. Clark St. 30°47′42″N 97°25′37″W	Bartlett	Extends into Williamson County
10	Barton House	Barton House	April 5, 1983 (#83003079)	Main St. 30°56′51″N 97°32′07″W	Salado	Historic Resources of Salado MRA
11	Baylor Female College Historic District	Baylor Female College Historic District	December 26, 1990 (#90001869)	Bounded by King, College and W. Ninth Sts. 31°04′01″N 97°27′50″W	Belton	Includes Recorded Texas Historic Landmark; Historic and Architectural Resources of Belton MPS
12	William Beamer House	William Beamer House	December 26, 1990 (#90001875)	1202 S. Beal St. 31°02′41″N 97°27′52″W	Belton	Historic and Architectural Resources of Belton MPS
13	Bell County Courthouse	Bell County Courthouse	December 12, 1976 (#76002004)	Public Sq. 31°03′21″N 97°27′49″W	Belton	State Antiquities Landmark, Recorded Texas Historic Landmark; part of Belton Commercial Historic District
14	Belton Academy	Belton Academy	December 26, 1990 (#90001937)	404 E. Ninth St. 31°03′49″N 97°27′28″W	Belton	Recorded Texas Historic Landmark; Historic and Architectural Resources of Belton MPS; also called Charles Wedemeyer House
15	Belton Commercial Historic District	Belton Commercial Historic District	December 26, 1990 (#90001868)	Roughly bounded by Nolan Valley Rd., Penelope St. and Nolan Cr.. 31°03′23″N 97°27′45″W	Belton	Includes State Antiquities Landmark, Recorded Texas Historic Landmarks; Historic and Architectural Resources of Belton MPS
16	Belton Farmers' Gin Coop	Belton Farmers' Gin Coop	December 26, 1990 (#90001870)	219 S. East Ave., Building 4; 31°03′18″N 97°27′45″W	Belton	Recorded Texas Historic Landmark; Historic and Architectural Resources of Belton MPS
17	Belton Standpipe	Belton Standpipe	December 26, 1990 (#90001900)	NW of jct. of TX 317 & I-35; 31°02′58″N 97°28′12″W	Belton	Historic and Architectural Resources of Belton MPS
18	Belton Yarn Mill	Belton Yarn Mill	December 26, 1990 (#90001899)	805 E. Fourth St. 31°03′28″N 97°27′14″W	Belton	Historic and Architectural Resources of Belton MPS
19	T. Hamp and Beulah Birdwell House	T. Hamp and Beulah Birdwell House	December 26, 1990 (#90001896)	503 N. Wall; 31°03′37″N 97°27′32″W	Belton	Historic and Architectural Resources of Belton MPS
20	R. F. and Lena Burford House	R. F. and Lena Burford House	December 26, 1990 (#90001893)	920 N. Penelope St. 31°03′01″N 97°27′33″W	Belton	Historic and Architectural Resources of Belton MPS
21	Carnegie Public Library	Carnegie Public Library	March 4, 1985 (#85000473)	201 N. Main St. 31°03′27″N 97°27′48″W	Belton	Recorded Texas Historic Landmark; part of Belton Commercial Historic District
22	Cornelison House	Cornelison House	December 26, 1990 (#90001886)	1102 N. Pearl St. 31°04′01″N 97°27′41″W	Belton	Historic and Architectural Resources of Belton MPS
23	Davis House	Davis House	April 5, 1983 (#83003080)	Main St. 30°56′41″N 97°32′11″W	Salado	Historic Resources of Salado MRA
24	Joel Elliott House	Joel Elliott House	December 26, 1990 (#90001876)	716 N. College St. 31°03′50″N 97°27′51″W	Belton	Historic and Architectural Resources of Belton MPS
25	Ferguson House	Ferguson House	December 8, 1978 (#78002888)	518 N. 7th St. 31°06′12″N 97°20′36″W	Temple	Recorded Texas Historic Landmark
26	James A. Ferguson House	James A. Ferguson House	December 26, 1990 (#90001874)	1123 N. Beal St. 31°03′57″N 97°27′19″W	Belton	Historic and Architectural Resources of Belton MPS
27	James E. and Miriam Ferguson House	James E. and Miriam Ferguson House	December 26, 1990 (#90001889)	604 N. Penelope St. 31°03′41″N 97°27′37″W	Belton	Historic and Architectural Resources of Belton MPS
28	First Christian Church Parsonage	First Christian Church Parsonage	December 26, 1990 (#90001890)	608 N. Penelope St. 31°03′43″N 97°27′36″W	Belton	Historic and Architectural Resources of Belton MPS
29	Fowler House	Fowler House	April 5, 1983 (#83003081)	Main St. 30°57′30″N 97°31′58″W	Salado	Recorded Texas Historic Landmark; Historic Resources of Salado MRA
30	Dr. Jacob Moore Frazier House	Dr. Jacob Moore Frazier House	December 26, 1990 (#90001897)	618 N. Wall; 31°03′42″N 97°27′32″W	Belton	Historic and Architectural Resources of Belton MPS
31	Gault Archaeological Site	Gault Archaeological Site	May 29, 2018 (#100002469)	Address Restricted	Florence	
32	Gray Rental Houses	Gray Rental Houses	December 26, 1990 (#90001934)	702-708 N. Pearl St. 31°03′48″N 97°27′46″W	Belton	Historic and Architectural Resources of Belton MPS
33	Capt. Robert Halley House	Capt. Robert Halley House	April 5, 1983 (#83003082)	Main St. 30°57′15″N 97°31′57″W	Salado	Recorded Texas Historic Landmark; Historic Resources of Salado MRA
34	John P. Hammersmith House	John P. Hammersmith House	December 26, 1990 (#90001883)	520 S. Main St. 31°03′10″N 97°27′56″W	Belton	Recorded Texas Historic Landmark; Historic and Architectural Resources of Belton MPS; also called Clark House
35	Capt. Andrew Jackson Harris House	Capt. Andrew Jackson Harris House	December 26, 1990 (#90001871)	1001 W. Tenth Ave. 31°04′02″N 97°28′09″W	Belton	Recorded Texas Historic Landmark; Historic and Architectural Resources of Belton MPS
36	Hendrickson-Caskey House	Hendrickson-Caskey House	February 10, 1995 (#95000054)	Center Circle; 30°56′42″N 97°31′54″W	Salado	Historic Resources of Salado MRA
37	High View		December 29, 2020 (#100005990)	731 Wolf St. 31°06′46″N 97°44′15″W	Killeen	
38	House at 402 N. East St.		December 26, 1990 (#90001878)	402 N. East St. 31°03′33″N 97°27′44″W	Belton	Historic and Architectural Resources of Belton MPS; House demolished or moved
39	House at 730 N. Beal St.	House at 730 N. Beal St.	December 26, 1990 (#90001936)	730 N. Beal St. 31°03′45″N 97°27′26″W	Belton	Historic and Architectural Resources of Belton MPS
40	Dr. Taylor Hudson House	Dr. Taylor Hudson House	December 26, 1990 (#90001879)	324 N. Main St. 31°03′33″N 97°27′48″W	Belton	Historic and Architectural Resources of Belton MPS
41	James House		December 26, 1990 (#90001873)	805 N. Beal St. 31°03′48″N 97°27′22″W	Belton	Historic and Architectural Resources of Belton MPS
42	Killeen Downtown Historic District	Killeen Downtown Historic District	March 31, 2014 (#14000098)	Roughly bounded by Avenue A, Santa Fe Plaza, North 4th & North 8th Streets; 31°07′19″N 97°43′38″W	Killeen	
43	Killeen High School	Killeen High School	May 18, 2015 (#15000244)	101 North College Street; 31°07′16″N 97°44′00″W	Killeen	Recorded Texas Historic Landmark
44	L. B. Kinchion House	L. B. Kinchion House	December 26, 1990 (#90001887)	702 S. Pearl St. 31°03′04″N 97°27′58″W	Belton	Historic and Architectural Resources of Belton MPS
45	Kyle Hotel	Kyle Hotel	August 5, 1993 (#93000772)	111 Main St. 31°05′54″N 97°20′26″W	Temple	Part of Temple Commercial Historic District
46	Walter J. Lee House		December 26, 1990 (#90001877)	804 N. College St. 31°03′52″N 97°27′49″W	Belton	Historic and Architectural Resources of Belton MPS; House demolished or moved
47	George and Martha McWhirter House	George and Martha McWhirter House	December 26, 1990 (#90001884)	400 N. Pearl St. 31°03′36″N 97°27′50″W	Belton	Historic and Architectural Resources of Belton MPS
48	V. R. Means House	V. R. Means House	December 26, 1990 (#90001938)	609 E. 14th St. 31°04′04″N 97°27′05″W	Belton	Historic and Architectural Resources of Belton MPS
49	J. Z. Miller House		December 26, 1990 (#90001892)	804 N. Penelope St. 31°03′47″N 97°27′33″W	Belton	Historic and Architectural Resources of Belton MPS
50	Miller-Curtis House	Miller-Curtis House	April 7, 1983 (#83003083)	1004 N. Main St. 31°03′56″N 97°27′38″W	Belton	Recorded Texas Historic Landmark; also called Curtis Mansion
51	Missouri, Kansas & Texas Railroad Bridge at the Leon River		December 26, 1990 (#90001898)	Across the Leon R. at Taylor's Valley Rd. 31°03′44″N 97°26′35″W	Belton	Historic and Architectural Resources of Belton MPS
52	Missouri, Kansas and Texas (MK&T-Katy) Railway Passenger Depot	Missouri, Kansas and Texas (MK&T-Katy) Railway Passenger Depot	December 26, 1990 (#100007401)	620 Central Ave. 31°05′43″N 97°20′02″W	Temple	
53	Morey House	Morey House	December 26, 1990 (#90001880)	328 N. Main St. 31°03′33″N 97°27′47″W	Belton	Historic and Architectural Resources of Belton MPS
54	Mount Zion United Methodist Church	Mount Zion United Methodist Church	December 26, 1990 (#90001872)	218 Alexander St. 31°03′35″N 97°27′57″W	Belton	Historic and Architectural Resources of Belton MPS
55	Robert Naismith House		December 26, 1990 (#90001888)	440 N. Penelope St. 31°03′36″N 97°27′39″W	Belton	Historic and Architectural Resources of Belton MPS; House demolished or moved
56	Norton-Orgain House	Norton-Orgain House	March 25, 1992 (#92000185)	Main St. 30°56′50″N 97°32′11″W	Salado	Recorded Texas Historic Landmark; Historic Resources of Salado MRA
57	Old St. Luke's Episcopal Church	Old St. Luke's Episcopal Church	January 17, 1974 (#74002056)	438 N. Wall St. 31°03′36″N 97°27′33″W	Belton	
58	Arthur Potts House	Arthur Potts House	December 26, 1990 (#90001895)	445 N. Wall; 31°03′35″N 97°27′33″W	Belton	Historic and Architectural Resources of Belton MPS
59	Col. Elijah Sterling Clack Robertson Plantation	Col. Elijah Sterling Clack Robertson Plantation	April 5, 1983 (#83003084)	I-35; 30°56′32″N 97°32′34″W	Salado	Recorded Texas Historic Landmark; Historic Resources of Salado MRA
60	Maj. A. J. Rose House	Maj. A. J. Rose House	May 22, 1978 (#78002887)	Wm. Rose Way and Royal St. 30°56′26″N 97°31′46″W	Salado	Recorded Texas Historic Landmark
61	Salado College Archeological Site	Salado College Archeological Site	March 1, 1985 (#85000403)	Main St & College Hill; 30°56′30″N 97°32′14″W	Salado	Historic Resources of Salado MRA; Smithsonian trinomial 41BL241
62	Salado United Methodist Church	Salado United Methodist Church	August 22, 1984 (#84001573)	Off Royal St. 30°56′30″N 97°31′44″W	Salado	Recorded Texas Historic Landmark; Historic Resources of Salado MRA; built in 1890; moved from its original location in 2005.
63	Stagecoach Inn	Stagecoach Inn	April 5, 1983 (#83003085); October 10, 2017 boundary increase (#100001721)	Main and Front Sts.; also 401 S. Stagecoach Rd. 30°56′31″N 97°32′15″W	Salado	Recorded Texas Historic Landmark; Historic Resources of Salado MRA; second set of addresses represent a boundary increase approved October 10, 2017.
64	State Highway 53 Bridge at the Leon River	State Highway 53 Bridge at the Leon River	October 10, 1996 (#96001119)	FM 817, 2.5 mi (4.0 km). E of jct. with FM 93; 31°03′59″N 97°26′33″W	Belton	Historic Bridges of Texas, 1866-1945 MPS
65	Temple Commercial Historic District	Temple Commercial Historic District	October 28, 2005 (#05001192)	Roughly bounded by French Av., 3rd St., Av. D & 6th St. 31°05′53″N 97°20′28″W	Temple	Includes Recorded Texas Historic Landmarks
66	Levi Tenney House	Levi Tenney House	April 5, 1983 (#83003086)	Pace Park Dr. 30°56′49″N 97°32′08″W	Salado	Historic Resources of Salado MRA
67	Twelve Oaks	Twelve Oaks	April 5, 1983 (#83003088)	Center Cirlce; 30°56′45″N 97°31′55″W	Salado	Recorded Texas Historic Landmark; Historic Resources of Salado MRA
68	Tyler House	Tyler House	April 5, 1983 (#83003087)	Main St. 30°56′45″N 97°32′15″W	Salado	Historic Resources of Salado MRA
69	W. J. Venable House		December 26, 1990 (#90001894)	426 N. Wall; 31°03′32″N 97°27′34″W	Belton	Historic and Architectural Resources of Belton MPS; House demolished or moved
70	Vickrey House	Vickrey House	April 5, 1983 (#83003089)	Main St. 30°57′04″N 97°32′11″W	Salado	Recorded Texas Historic Landmark; Historic Resources of Salado MRA
71	H. A. and Helena Ware House	H. A. and Helena Ware House	December 26, 1990 (#90001885)	401 N. Pearl St. 31°03′35″N 97°27′48″W	Belton	Historic and Architectural Resources of Belton MPS
72	White-Aiken House	White-Aiken House	April 5, 1983 (#83003090)	I-35; 30°57′36″N 97°31′58″W	Salado	Historic Resources of Salado MRA
73	Ralph and Sunny Wilson Sr. House	Ralph and Sunny Wilson Sr. House	November 25, 1998 (#98001374)	1714 S. 61st. St. 31°05′17″N 97°22′50″W	Temple	

== Former listing ==
	Name on the Register	Image	Date listed	Date removed	Location	City or town	Description
1	Dr. R. S. Farr House		December 26, 1990 (#90001935)	August 30, 1994	801 E Central Ave.	Belton	Delisted after being relocated to Salado in 1993.

== See also ==
- National Register of Historic Places listings in Texas
- Recorded Texas Historic Landmarks in Bell County
