= Bartlett Commercial Historic District =

Historic district in Texas, United States

- U.S. National Register of Historic Places
- U.S. Historic district
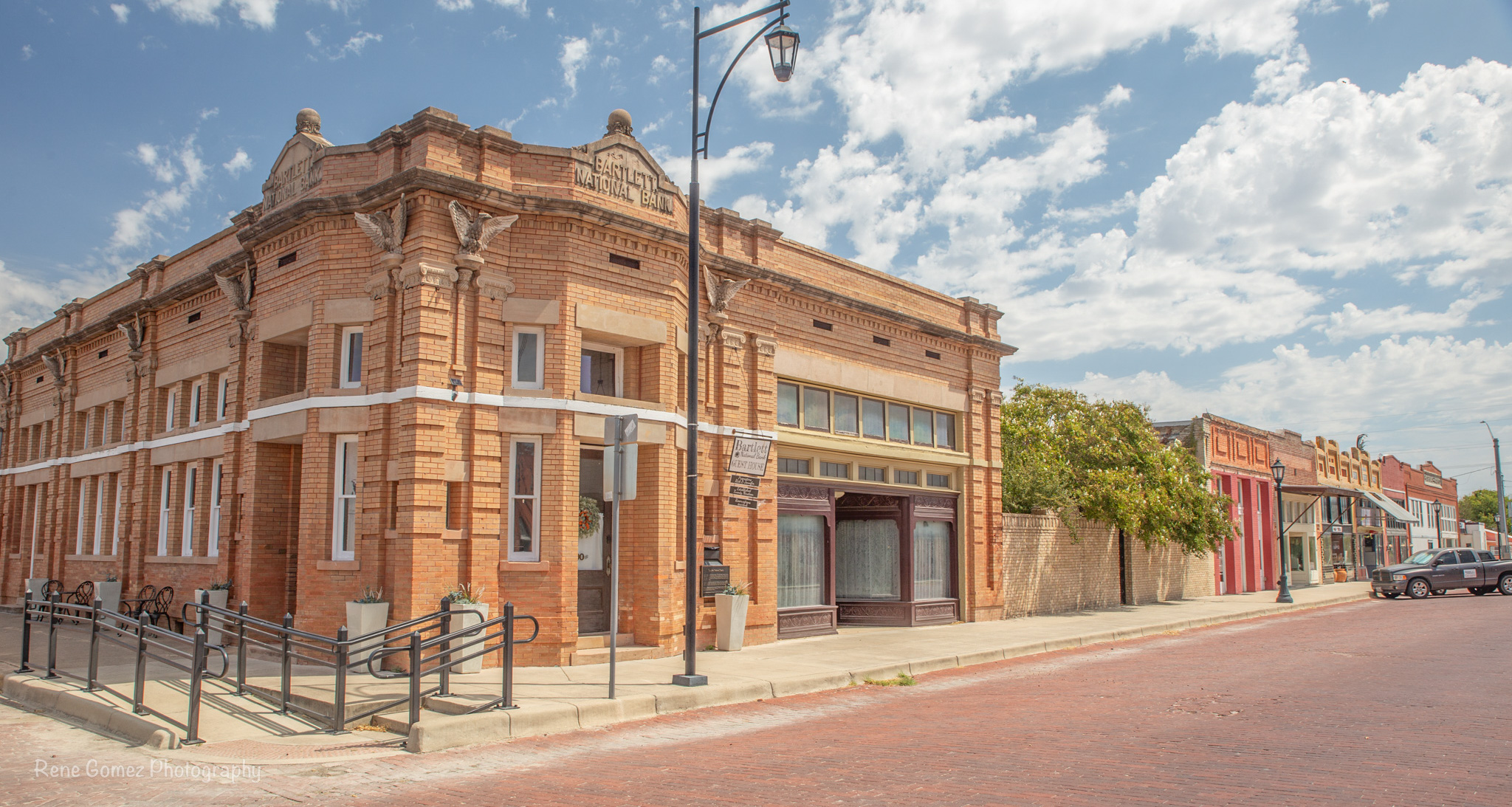
- Bartlett Historic District in 2023

- Location within Texas Location within the United States
- Location: E. Clark St., Bartlett, Texas
- Coordinates: 30°47′42″N 97°25′37″W
- Area: 8 acres (3.2 ha)
- Architectural style: Early Commercial, Beaux Arts
- NRHP reference No.: 80004076
- Added to NRHP: September 30, 1980

The Bartlett Historic District is a historic district in Bartlett, Texas, that is listed on the National Register of Historic Places. The district consists of a two block area of early 20th century commercial row buildings centered along E. Clark Street and is bounded on the east by State Highway 95 and on the west by railroad tracks. Evie Street dissects the district, and the boundaries extend one block north and one half block south along Evie to include virtually all of Bartlett's commercial buildings.

The Bartlett Historic District stands as a cohesive grouping of early 1900s commercial buildings and reflects the town's prosperity achieved during the early 20th century as a cotton shipping center in central Texas. Presenting a remarkably intact main street, the district includes the core of the city's past and present commercial activities within a well-defined boundary. Particularly noteworthy is the high percentage of contributing structures within the district—88%. Although many of the buildings remain in fair condition, few have been significantly altered.

== See also ==
- National Register of Historic Places listings in Bell County, Texas
- National Register of Historic Places listings in Williamson County, Texas
- Recorded Texas Historic Landmarks in Bell County
- Recorded Texas Historic Landmarks in Williamson County
