= First Christian Church Parsonage =

- U.S. National Register of Historic Places
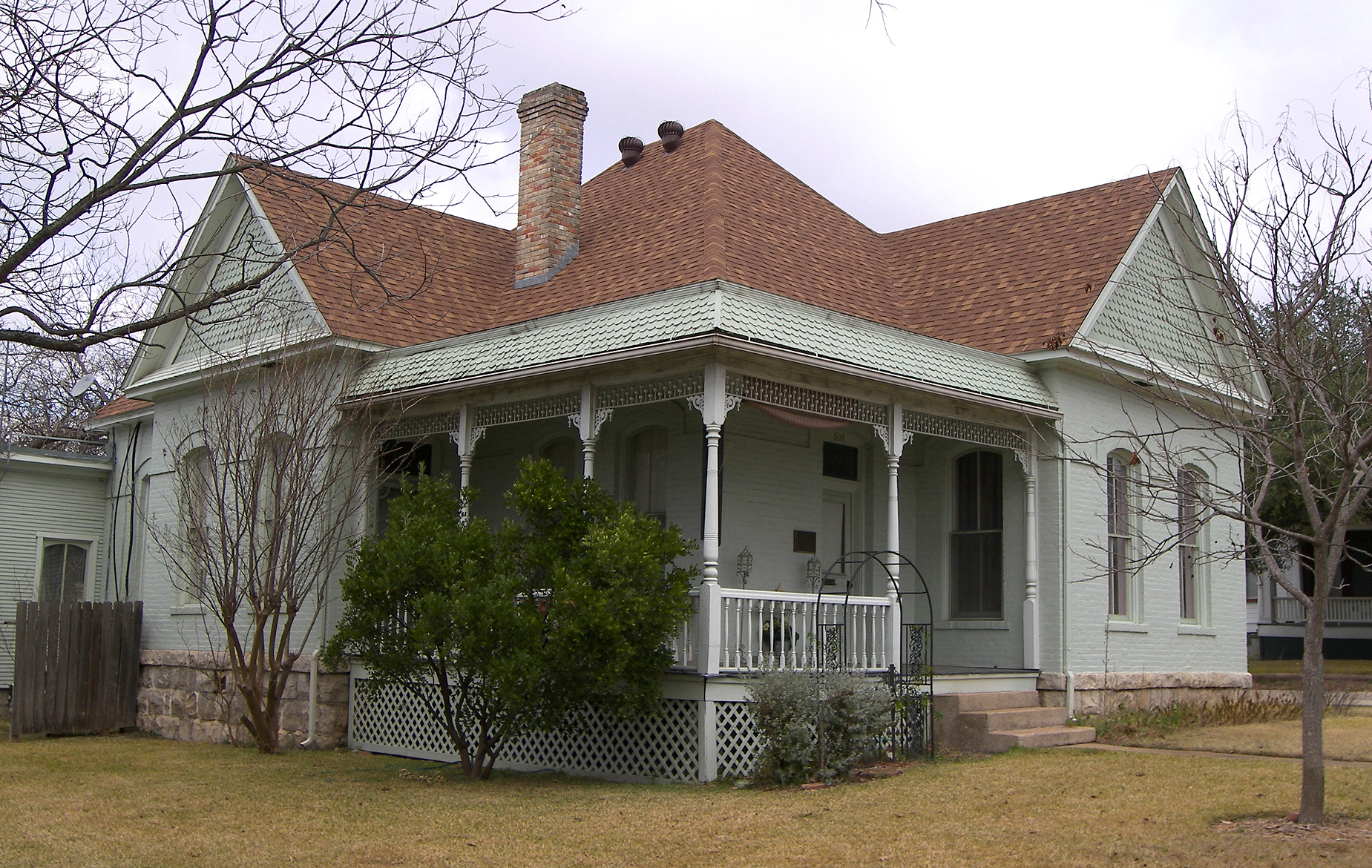
- Parsonage in 2009

- Location within Texas Location within the United States
- Location: 608 N. Penelope St., Belton, Texas
- Coordinates: 31°3′45″N 97°27′33″W
- Area: less than one acre
- Built: 1900
- Architectural style: Queen Anne, Italianate
- MPS: Belton MPS
- NRHP reference No.: 90001890
- Added to NRHP: December 26, 1990

First Christian Church Parsonage is a historic church parsonage at 608 N. Penelope Street in Belton, Texas.

It was built in 1900 and added to the National Register of Historic Places in 1990.

== See also ==
- National Register of Historic Places listings in Bell County, Texas
