= Stagecoach Inn (Salado, Texas) =

- U.S. National Register of Historic Places
- Recorded Texas Historic Landmark
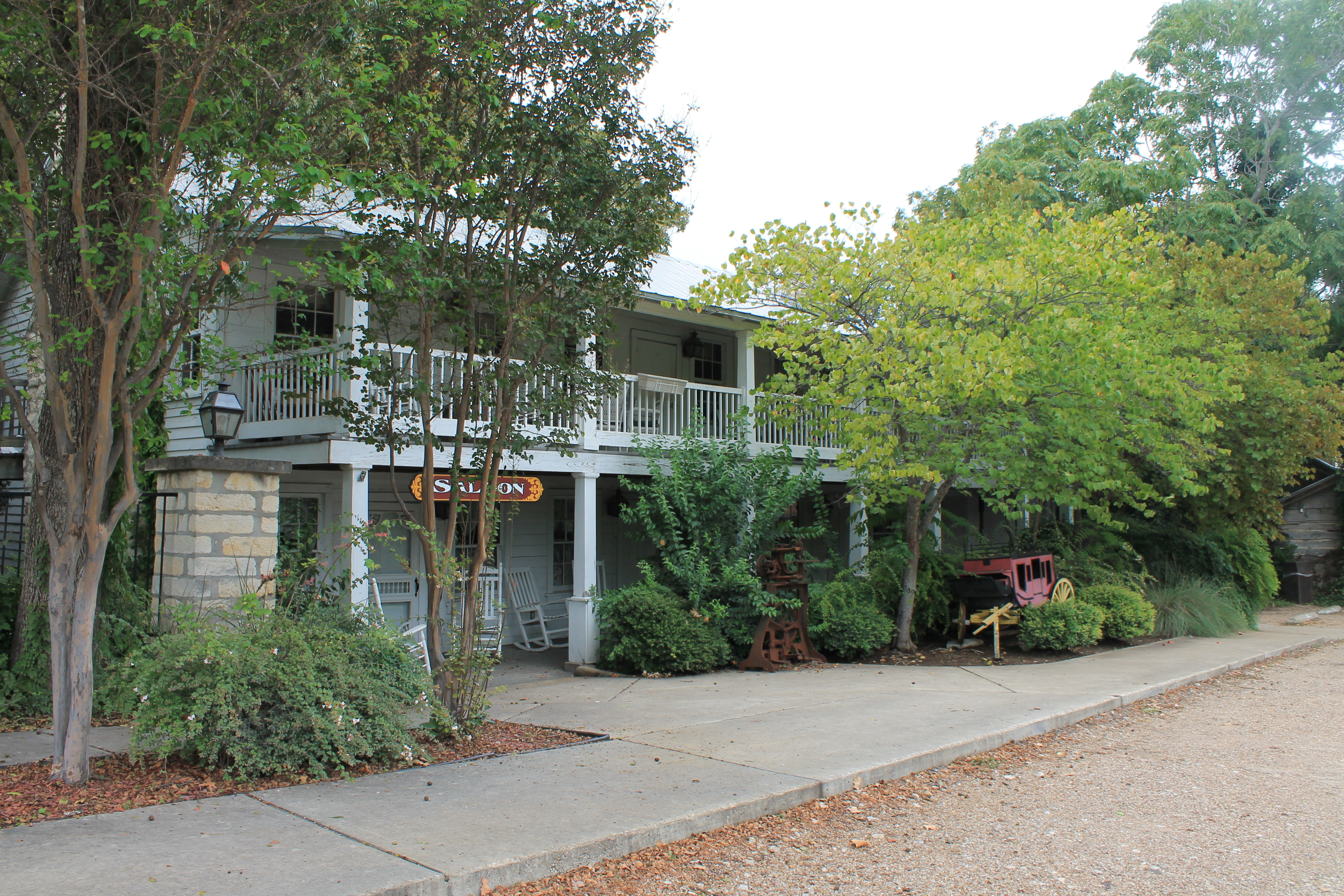

- Location within Texas Location within the United States
- Location: 401 S. Stagecoach Rd. Salado, Texas
- Coordinates: 30°56′34″N 97°32′20″W
- Built: 1852
- Built by: W.B. Armstrong
- Architectural style: Frontier vernacular
- MPS: Salado MRA
- NRHP reference No.: 83003085 (original); 100001721 (increase)
- RTHL No.: 5091

Significant dates
- Added to NRHP: April 5, 1983
- Boundary increase: October 10, 2017
- Designated RTHL: 1962

Built starting in 1852, the Stagecoach Inn of Salado, Texas, is thought to be the oldest extant structure in the village. The Inn was built as a stagecoach stop along the Chisholm Trail. The simple, two-story wood-frame building is in a frontier vernacular style. The structure was extended several times in the 1940s and 1950s to serve as a restaurant. The inn was listed on the National Register of Historic Places in 1983. The inn has also been a member of Historic Hotels of America, the official program of the National Trust for Historic Preservation, since 2018., although its current name with the organization is the "Shady Villa Hotel."

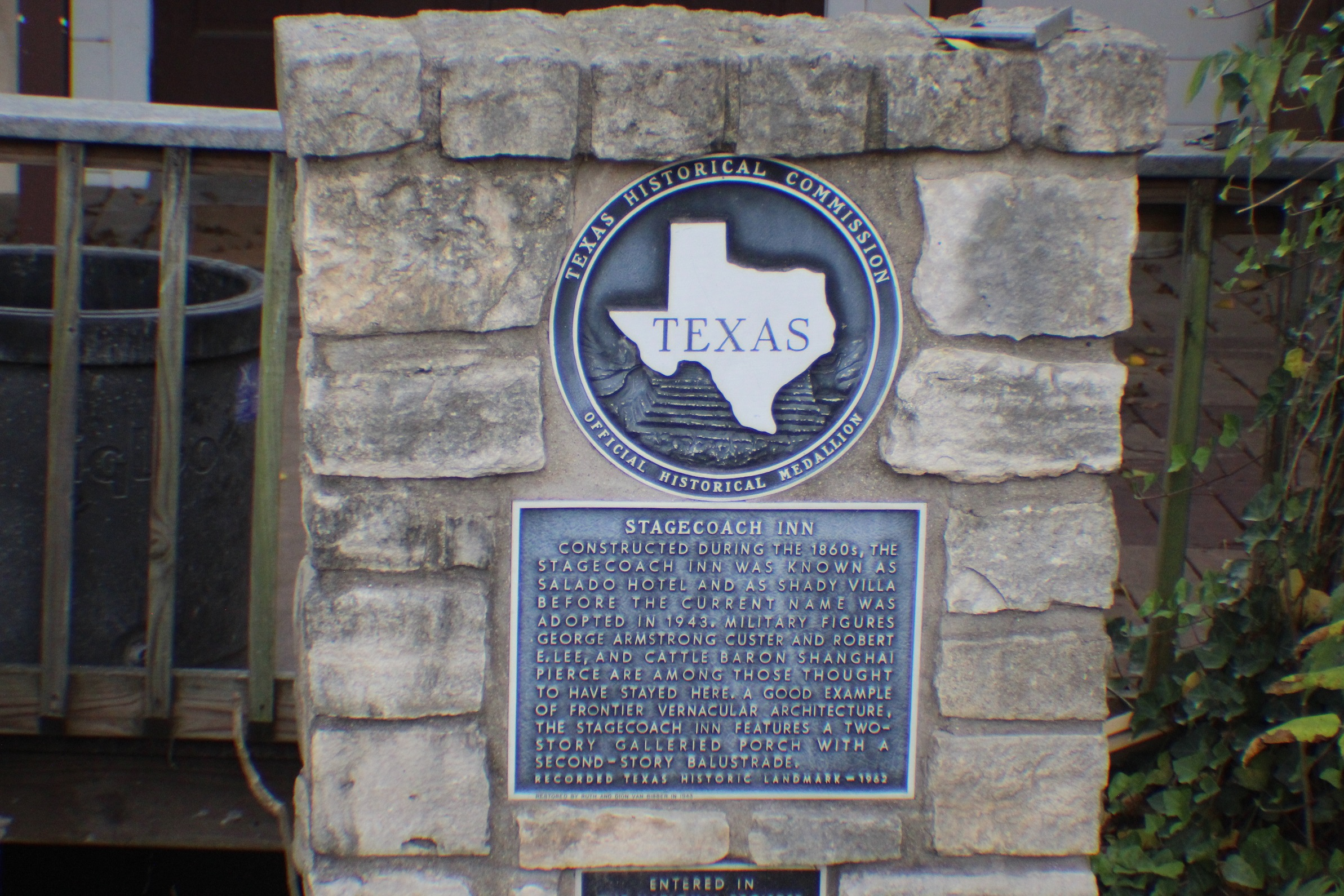
Stagecoach Inn Texas Historic Landmark

The nearby Salado Creek was designated a natural landmark in Texas in 1867.

== See also ==
- Stagecoach Inn of Chappell Hill, in Washington County
- Fanthorp Inn State Historic Site, in Grimes County
- National Register of Historic Places listings in Bell County, Texas
- Recorded Texas Historic Landmarks in Bell County
