= Mount Zion United Methodist Church (Belton, Texas) =

Historic church in Texas, United States

- U.S. National Register of Historic Places
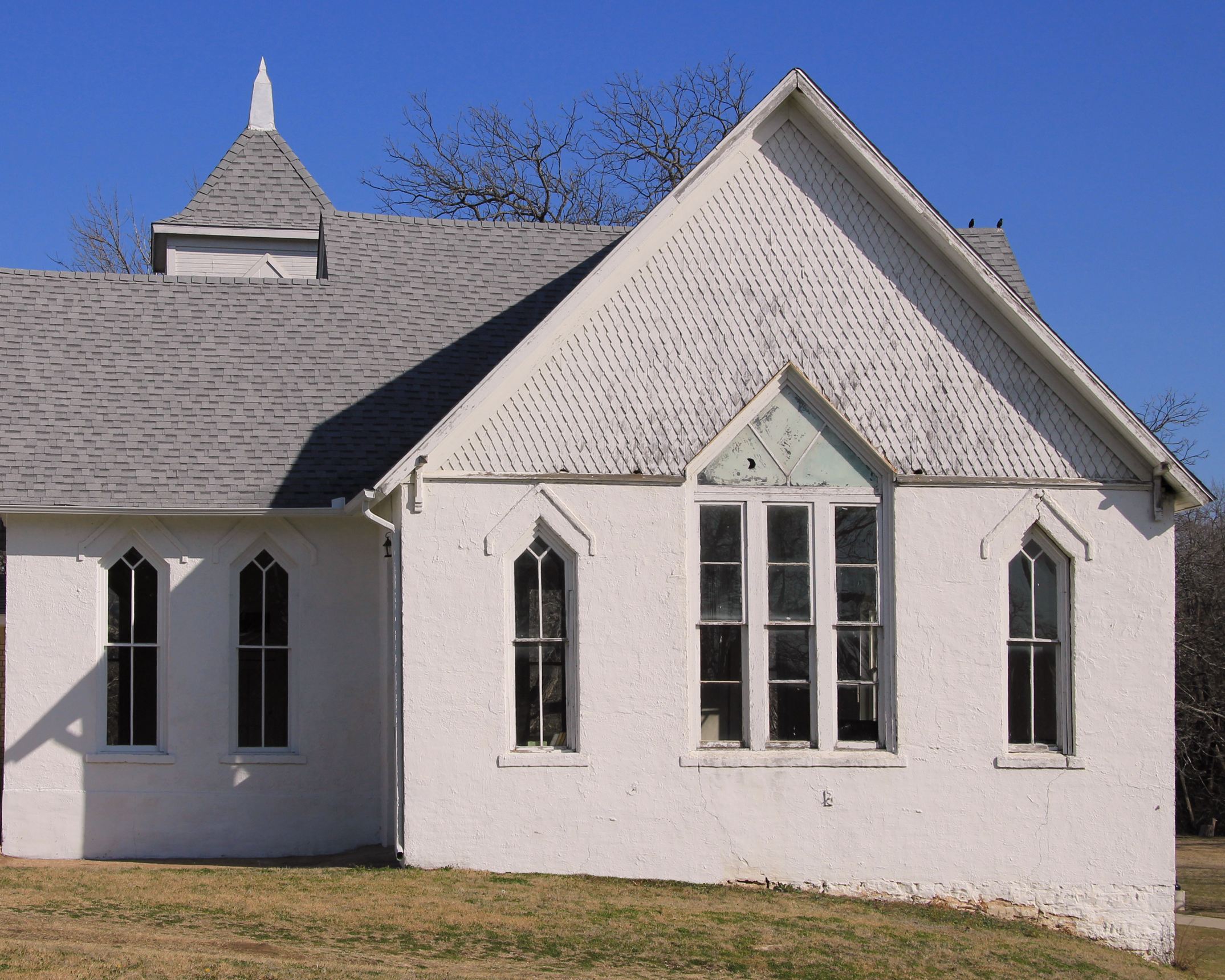
- South elevation of Mount Zion Church

- Location within Texas Location within the United States
- Location: 218 Alexander St., Belton, Texas
- Coordinates: 31°3′35″N 97°27′58″W
- Area: less than one acre
- Built: 1893
- Architectural style: Gothic Revival, Vernacular Gothic Revival
- MPS: Belton MPS
- NRHP reference No.: 90001872
- Added to NRHP: December 26, 1990

Mount Zion United Methodist Church is a historic church at 218 Alexander Street in Belton, Texas.

It was built in 1893 and added to the National Register of Historic Places in 1990.

It is located in a less than one acre area in Bell County, Texas.

== See also ==
- National Register of Historic Places listings in Bell County, Texas
