= George Washington Baines House =

Historic house in Salado, Texas

- U.S. National Register of Historic Places
- Recorded Texas Historic Landmark
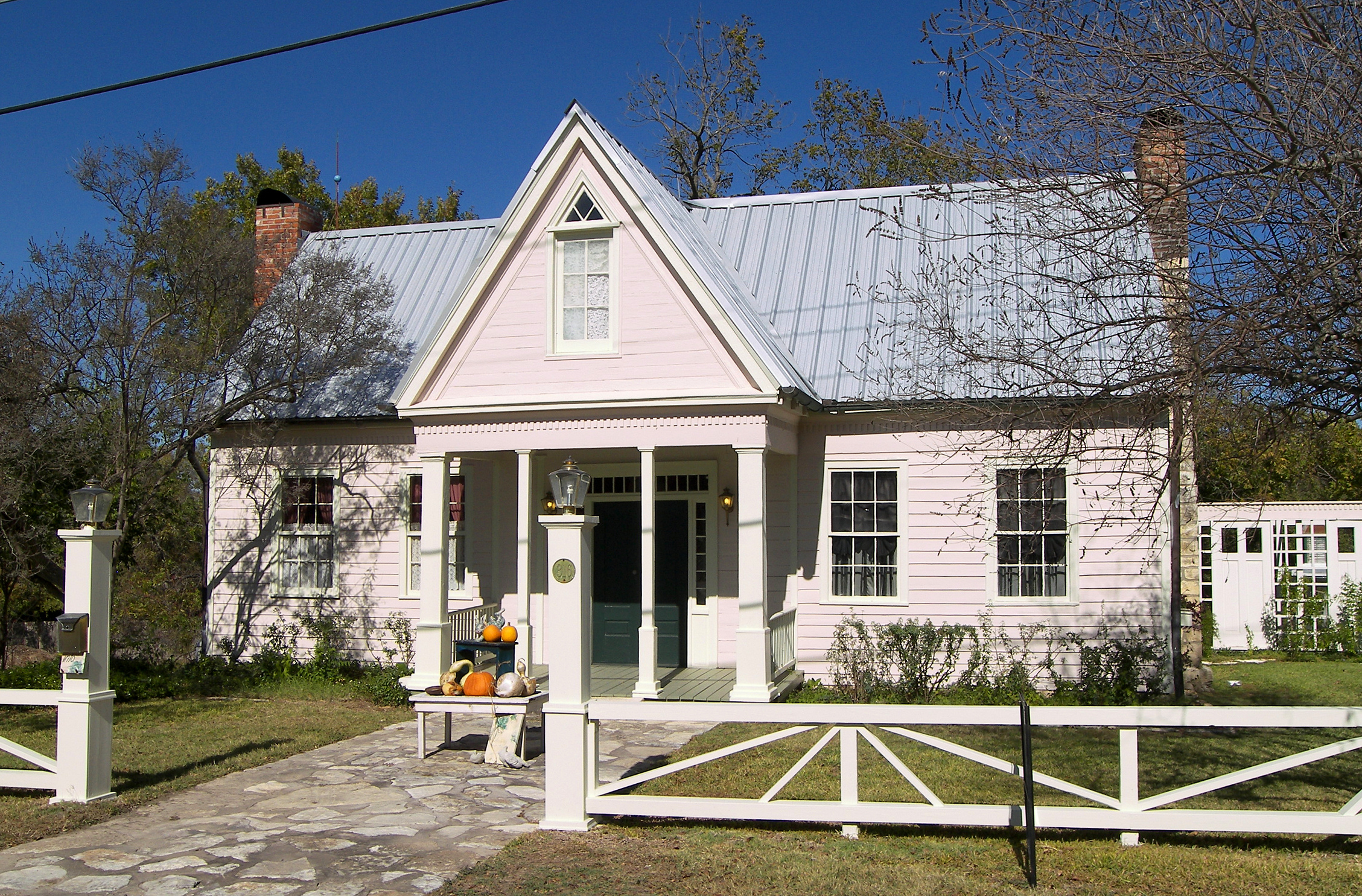
- George Washington Baines House
- Interactive map pinpointing the location of the house
- Location: 316 Royal St., Salado, Texas, U.S.
- Coordinates: 30°56′31″N 97°31′57″W
- Area: less than one acre
- Built: 1866
- Architectural style: Greek Revival
- MPS: Salado MRA
- NRHP reference No.: 83003078
- RTHL No.: 279

Significant dates
- Added to NRHP: April 5, 1983
- Designated RTHL: 1981

The George Washington Baines House is located in the city of Salado, Bell County, Texas. It was designated a Recorded Texas Historic Landmark in 1981 and added to the National Register of Historic Places in 1983.

George Washington Baines was the father of Joseph Wilson Baines, who was the father of Rebekah Baines, mother of Lyndon B. Johnson. A Baptist minister, Rev. Baines had been president of Baylor University, and traveled for the Baptist State Convention when he built this house around 1866. The Greek Revival style house is a one-and-one-half-story frame structure. The front of the house features a double-door transomed entrance. The porch is supported by square columns. Baines lived in this house from 1870 to 1882. Reverend Baines, his second wife Cynthia, daughter Anna Melissa, and son Taliaferro (Tollie) lived at the home.

The Baines House Bed, Breakfast & Beyond Inn formerly operated at the property. It described the home as an "original Greek revival, Texas dogtrot style home with [a] salt box roof".

== See also ==
- National Register of Historic Places listings in Bell County, Texas
- Recorded Texas Historic Landmarks in Bell County
