= Old St. Luke's Episcopal Church (Belton, Texas) =

Historic church in Texas, United States

- U.S. National Register of Historic Places
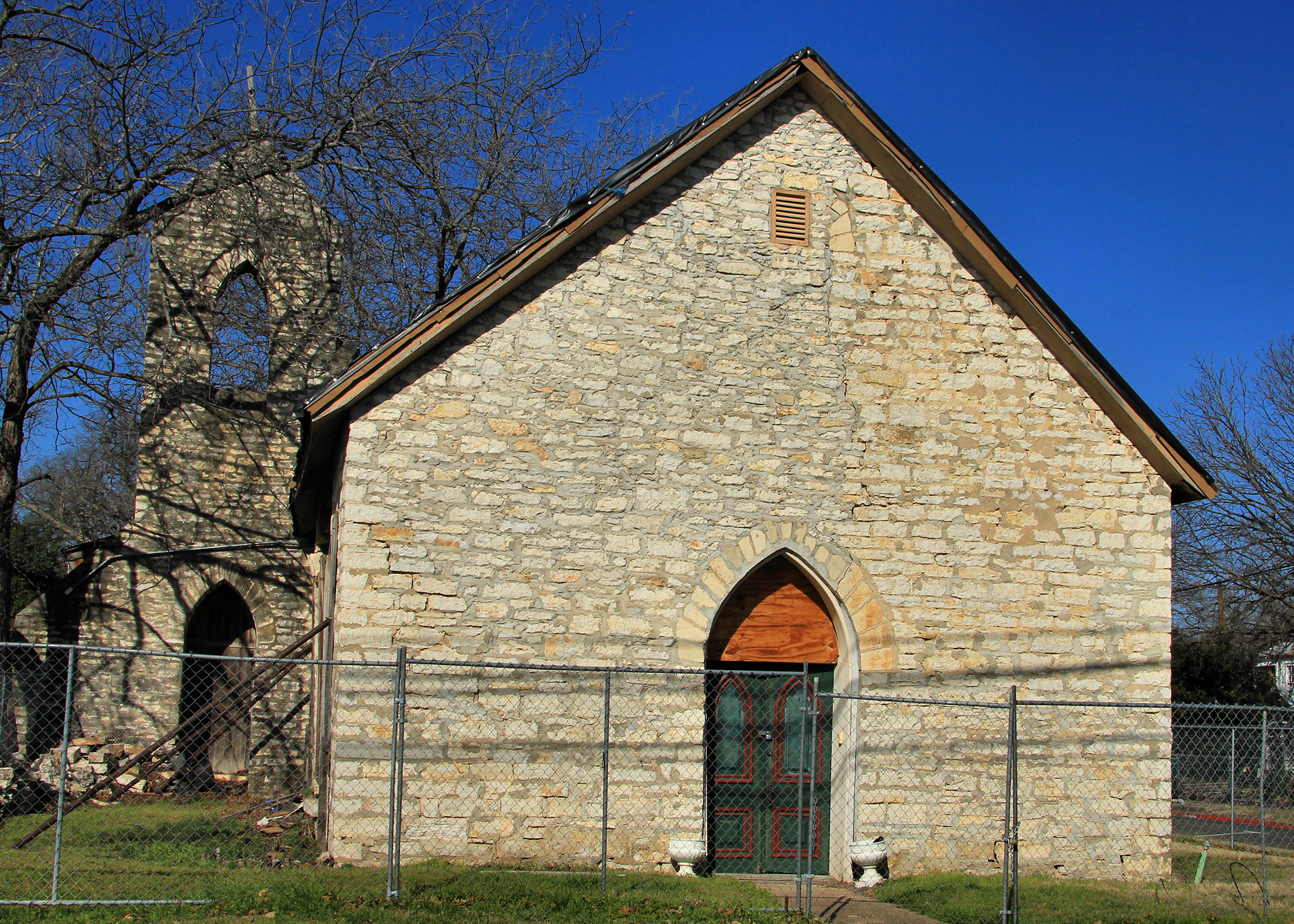
- Old St. Luke's Church in 2014

- Location within Texas Location within the United States
- Location: 438 N. Wall St., Belton, Texas
- Coordinates: 31°3′35″N 97°27′33″W
- Area: 1 acre (0.40 ha)
- Built: 1874
- Architectural style: Gothic, Vernacular Gothic
- NRHP reference No.: 74002056
- Added to NRHP: January 17, 1974

Old St. Luke's Episcopal Church is a historic church at 438 N. Wall Street in Belton, Texas.

It was built in 1874 in a Vernacular Gothic style and was added to the National Register of Historic Places in 1974.

== History ==
In 1999 local author Elizabeth Silverthorne wrote "A History of St. Luke's Episcopal Church in Belton" that detailed both the history of the building and the church. Despite being founded in 1860, the church wasn't admitted to the rolls of parishes of the Episcopal Church of Texas until 1863. During its early years, the congregation of St. Luke's used the meeting space of other area churches. In 1871, W.W. Patrick, a reverend in Waco, was appointed to minister St. Luke's one Sunday a month with John C. Moore, a lay reader, performing services the other weeks. Under Patrick's guidance, the congregation of St. Luke's raised the funds necessary to construct their own building. Patrick signed a contract to construct a 27-foot by 39-foot "rock house with a recess channel, semi-gothic in style". At the time, the cost for the endeavor was $3,000 — about $57,000 adjusted for inflation — and the stones were to be cut from Bell County quarries. The congregation raised about half of the needed money from the community and half was donated from other Episcopal churches throughout the country. Although construction of the building was completed in 1874, the new church was not consecrated by Alexander Gregg, the Episcopal bishop for Texas, until April 18, 1875. After the completion of the church Patrick relocated from Waco and became St. Luke's first full-time minister. However, by the 1960s things had picked up to the point that the congregation had outgrown their original building and on Sept. 10, 1968, a groundbreaking was held for a new church. Construction on the building lasted until early 1969. The new building was consecrated on March 23, 1969 — Palm Sunday. Shortly afterward, the 1874 building was deconsecrated. After its deconsecration, the building was sold to the Belton Fine Arts Association for $3,000, about $14,000 adjusted for inflation.

== See also ==
- National Register of Historic Places listings in Bell County, Texas
