= V. R. Means House =

Historic house in Texas, United States

- U.S. National Register of Historic Places
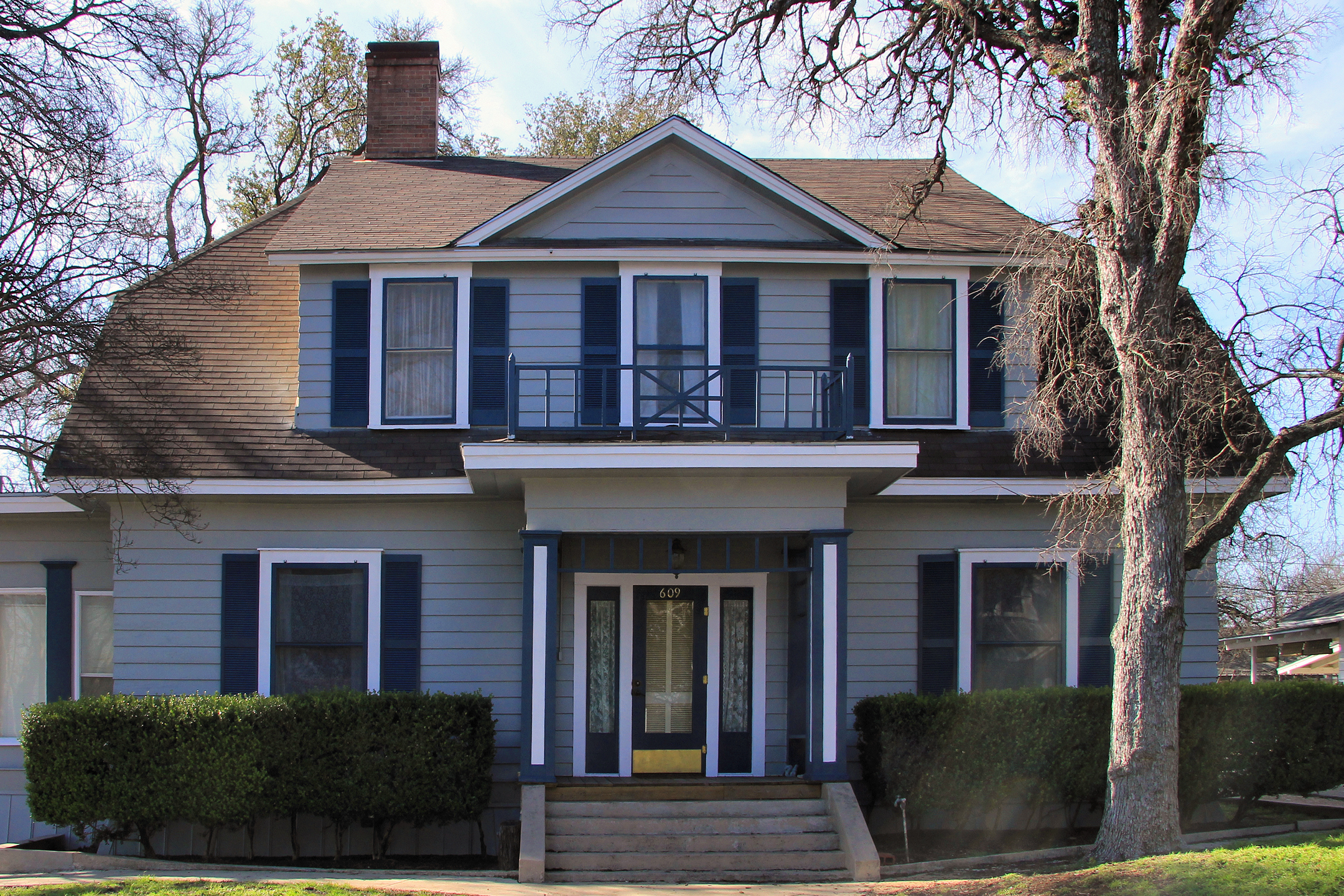
- Means House in 2014

- Location within Texas Location within the United States
- Location: 609 E. 14th St., Belton, Texas
- Coordinates: 31°4′1″N 97°27′2″W
- Area: less than one acre
- Built: 1913
- Built by: New Lumber Co.
- Architectural style: Colonial Revival
- MPS: Belton MPS
- NRHP reference No.: 90001938
- Added to NRHP: December 26, 1990

The V. R. Means House on E. 14th Street in Belton, Texas was built in 1913. It was listed on the National Register of Historic Places in 1990.

It was built by the New Lumber Co. for one of its officers, V.R. Means, and seems to have been intended as a model house for the firm's work. The firm eventually built more than 100 homes in the area.

== See also ==
- National Register of Historic Places listings in Bell County, Texas
