= Salado, Texas =

- Village
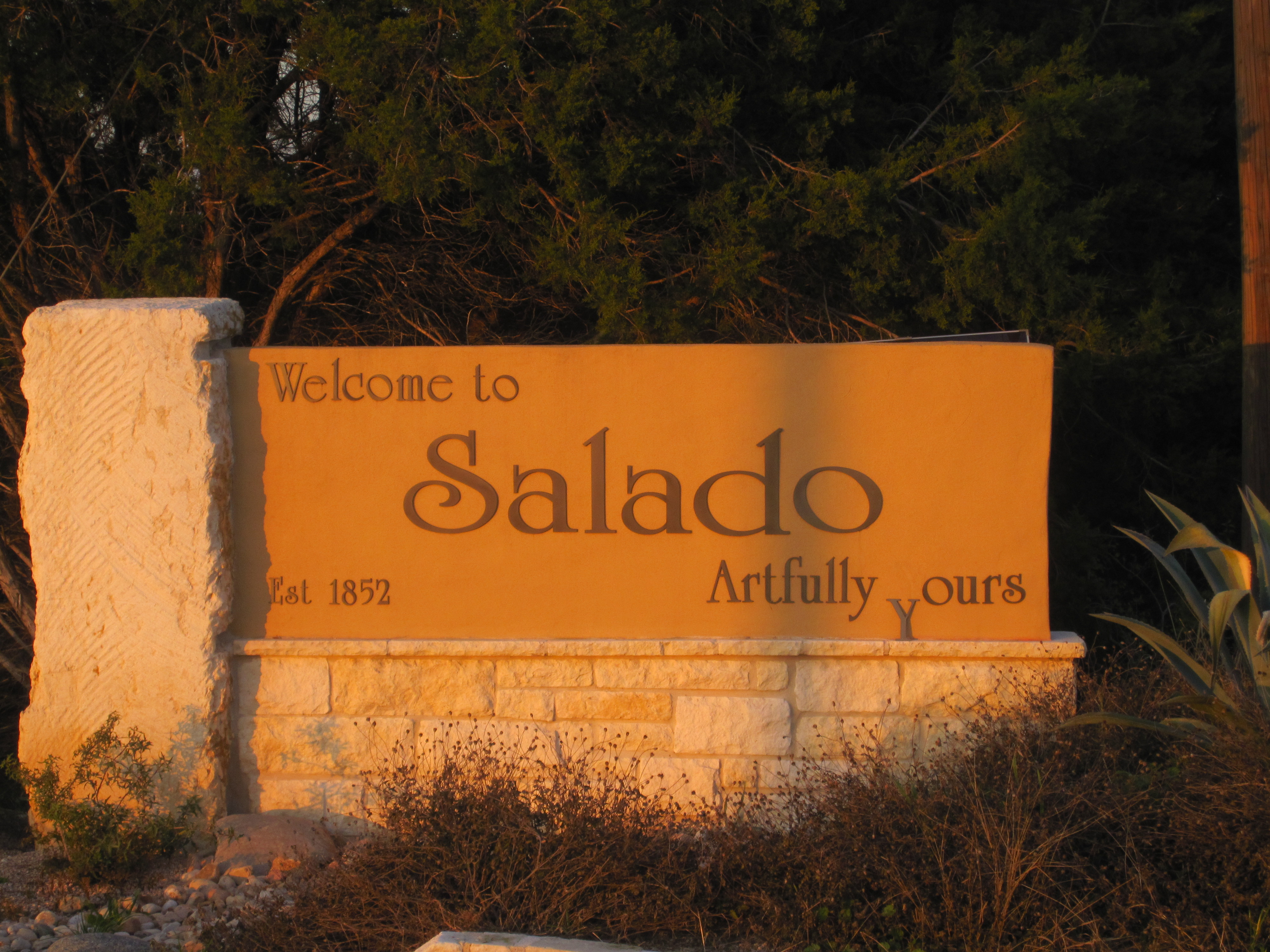
- Welcome sign in Salado (2009)
- Interactive map of Salado
- Location in Texas Location in the United States
- Coordinates: 30°56′50″N 97°31′44″W
- Country: United States
- State: Texas
- County: Bell

Area
  - Total: 3.15 sq mi (8.15 km^{2})
  - Land: 3.10 sq mi (8.03 km^{2})
  - Water: 0.046 sq mi (0.12 km^{2})
- Elevation: 620 ft (190 m)

Population (2020)
  - Total: 2,394
  - Density: 764.2/sq mi (295.04/km^{2})
- Time zone: UTC-6 (Central (CST))
  - Summer (DST): UTC-5 (CDT)
- ZIP code: 76571
- Area code: 254
- FIPS code: 48-64268
- GNIS ID: 2413586
- Website: saladotx.gov

Salado (/səˈleɪdoʊ/ sə-LAY-doh) is a village in Bell County, Texas. Salado was first incorporated in 1867 for the sole purpose of building a bridge across Salado Creek. In 2000, the citizens of Salado voted in favor of reincorporation, before which it was a census-designated place. Its population was 2,394 at the 2020 census.

== History ==
Archaeological evidence of a Paleolithic Native American settlement dating back about 15,500 years, the Buttermilk Creek Complex, has been unearthed in Salado.

The first record of white settlers in the area occurred in 1834, but by 1836, the pioneer settlers abandoned the area due to frequent Indian attacks and the invasion by General Santa Anna and the Mexican Army. The first permanent Anglo-American settler at Salado was Archibald Willingham in 1850. In 1852, the Salado Post Office was established. In 1859, the Salado College Joint Stock Company was created by Col. Elijah Sterling Clack Robertson, who donated 320 acres north and south of the springs to be broken into lots and form the village of Salado, with the proceeds of the sale going to form Salado College. The college operated from 1860 to 1885 and 1895 to 1913; the former college building was occupied by the Thomas Arnold High School.

From 1866 to 1885, the famous Chisholm Trail cattle drives passed through this area, with the Stagecoach Inn being one of the stops. In 1867, Salado incorporated to build a bridge across Salado Creek. By 1884, Salado had a population around 900, seven churches, 14 stores, two hotels, two blacksmiths, and three cotton gins. However, after the railroads bypassed Salado to the north and south, trade moved away from the town and the population began to dwindle, hitting 400 by 1914 and down to 200 by 1950.

The Stagecoach Inn is the oldest continuously running hotel in Texas.

Nineteen Salado locations are listed in the National Register of Historic Places, including the George Washington Baines House.

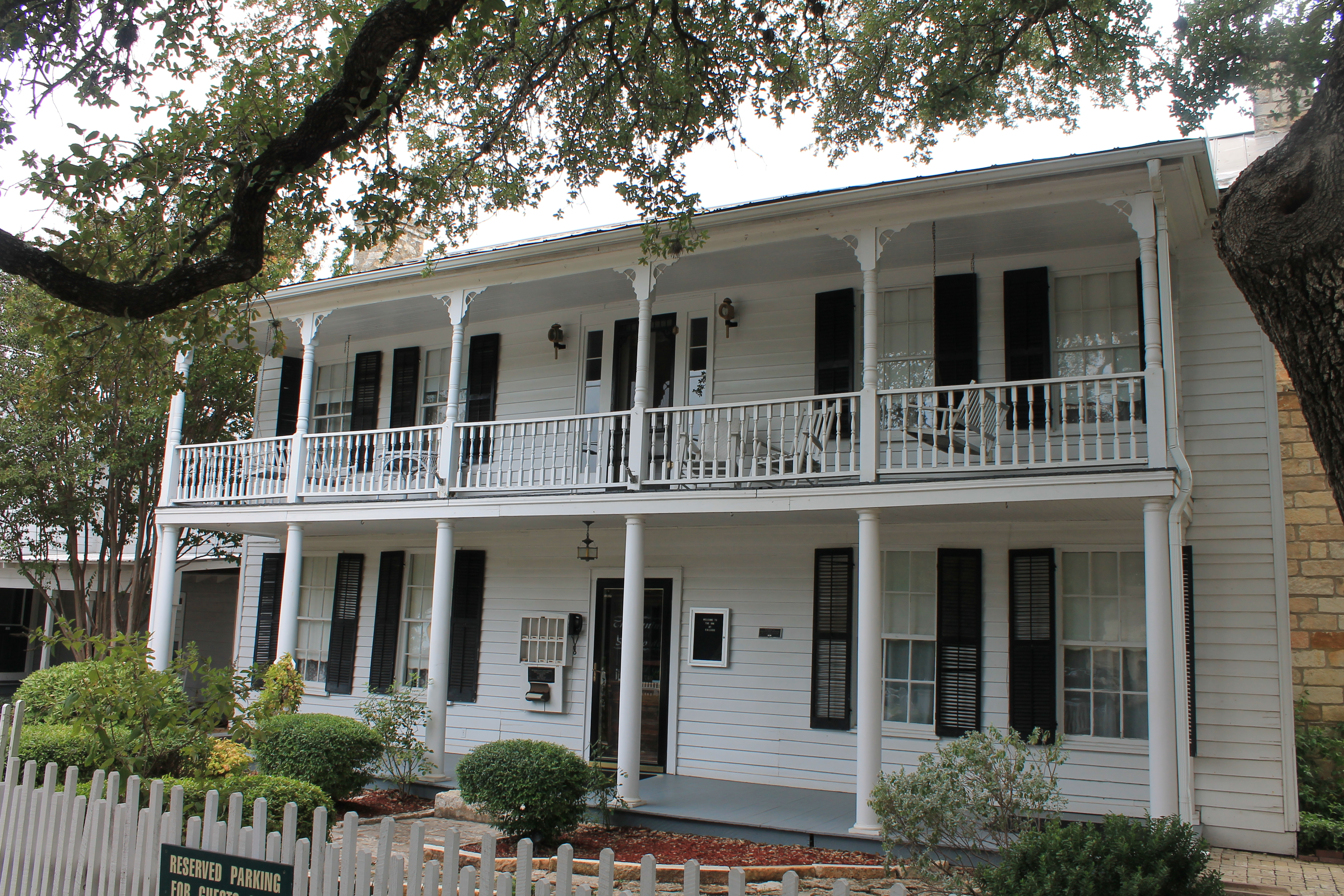
Norton-Orgain house

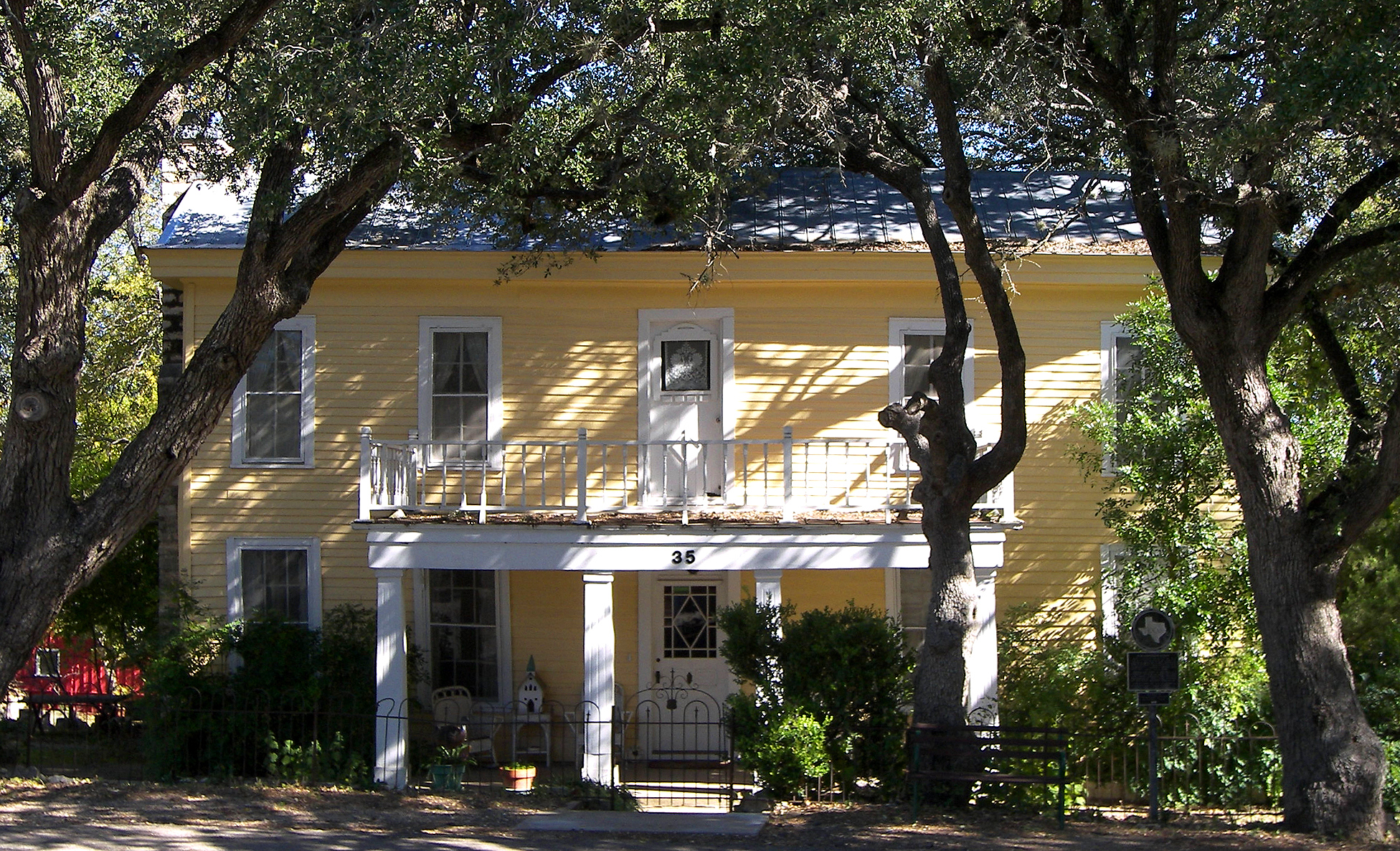
Anderson house

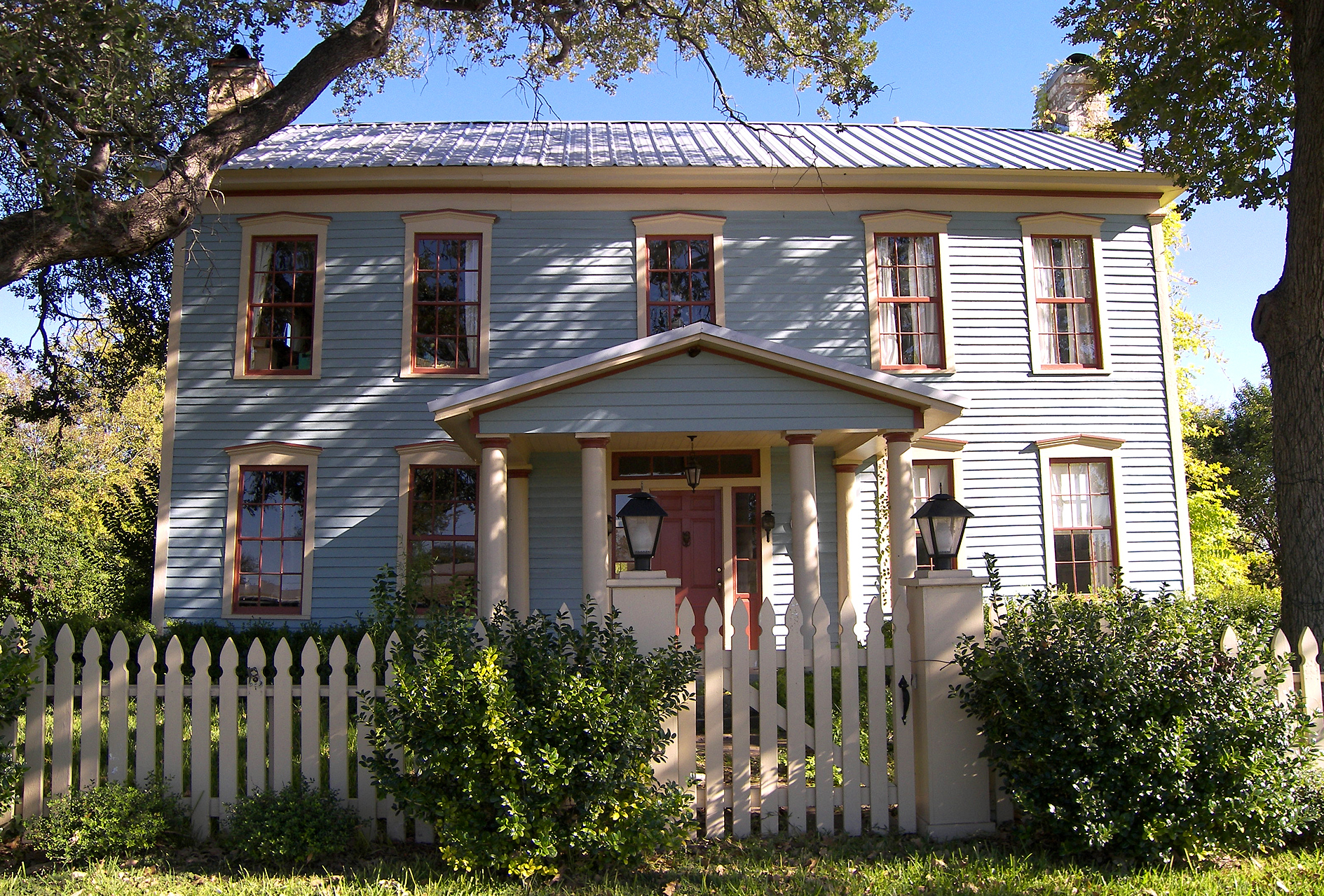
Fowler house

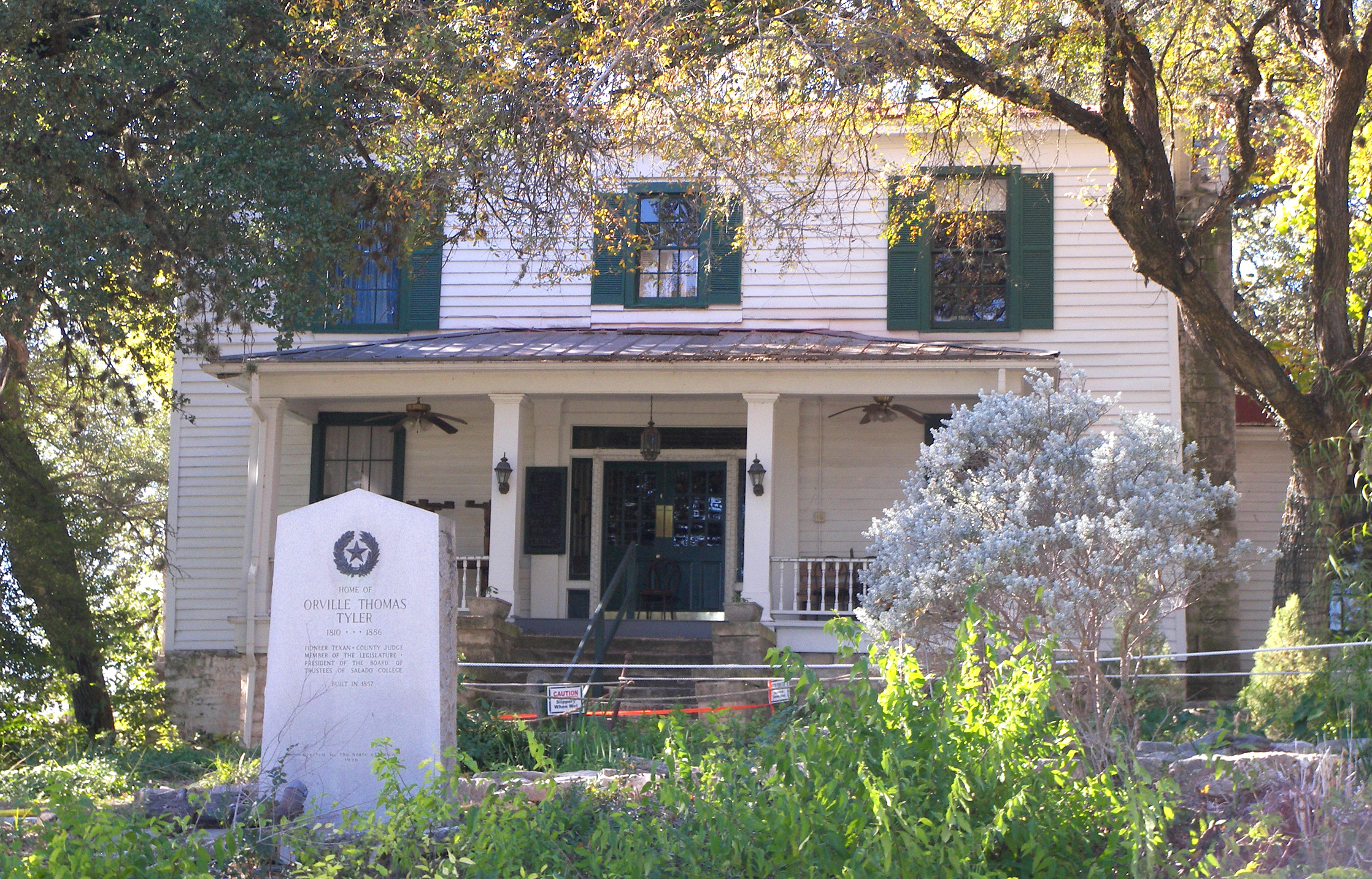
Tyler house

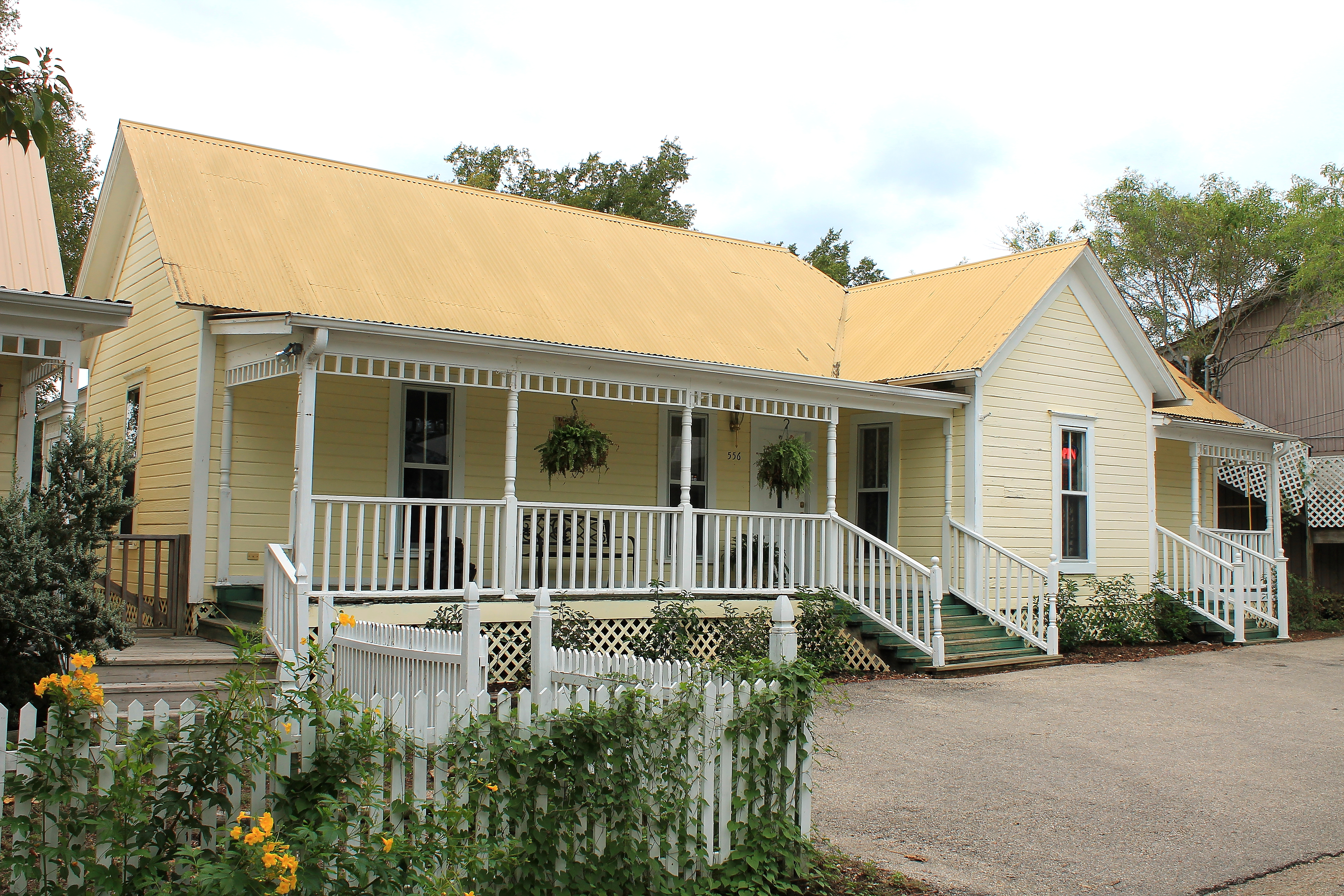
Davis house

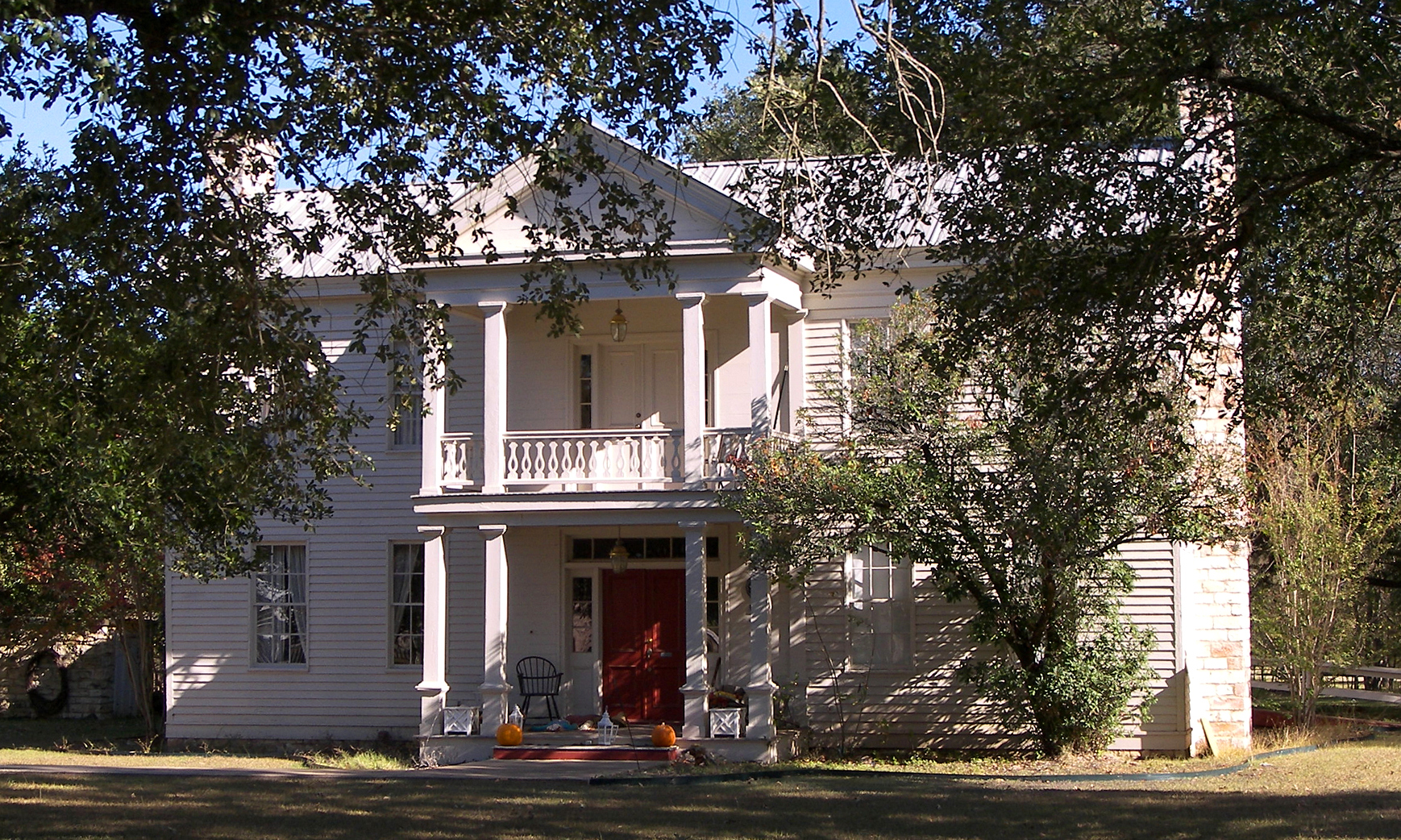
Halley house

== Geography ==
Salado is located in south-central Bell County. Interstate 35 runs through the village, leading north 9 miles (14 km) to Belton, the county seat, and south 9 miles (14 km) to Jarrell and then even further south 23 miles (37 km) to Georgetown.

According to the United States Census Bureau, the village has a total area of 2.2 square miles (5.7 km^{2}), of which 0.04 square miles (0.1 km^{2}), or 2.10%, is covered by water.

Salado is located along the Balcones Fault, which causes the emergence of surface waters. The fault line is also a demarcation line for some species' natural ranges. For example, the California fan palm, Washingtonia filifera, occurs strictly west of Salado or the Balcones Fault.

Salado Creek was selected as the first Texas Natural Landmark.

=== Climate ===
The climate in this area is characterized by hot, humid summers and generally mild to cool winters. According to the Köppen climate classification system, Salado has a humid subtropical climate, Cfa on climate maps.

Climate data for Salado, TX
Month	Jan	Feb	Mar	Apr	May	Jun	Jul	Aug	Sep	Oct	Nov	Dec	Year
Record high °F (°C)	87 (31)	98 (37)	97 (36)	99 (37)	100 (38)	106 (41)	109 (43)	109 (43)	110 (43)	99 (37)	93 (34)	86 (30)	110 (43)
Mean daily maximum °F (°C)	61 (16)	64 (18)	71 (22)	79 (26)	85 (29)	91 (33)	95 (35)	96 (36)	90 (32)	81 (27)	71 (22)	62 (17)	78.8 (26.0)
Mean daily minimum °F (°C)	36 (2)	40 (4)	47 (8)	55 (13)	63 (17)	70 (21)	73 (23)	72 (22)	66 (19)	56 (13)	47 (8)	38 (3)	55.3 (12.9)
Record low °F (°C)	0 (−18)	12 (−11)	15 (−9)	28 (−2)	28 (−2)	48 (9)	52 (11)	55 (13)	39 (4)	21 (−6)	16 (−9)	−5 (−21)	−5 (−21)
Average rainfall inches (mm)	2.13 (54)	2.69 (68)	3.19 (81)	2.59 (66)	4.51 (115)	4.23 (107)	1.93 (49)	2.25 (57)	3.70 (94)	3.97 (101)	2.94 (75)	2.75 (70)	36.88 (937)
Source: The Weather Channel

== Demographics ==
Historical population
Census	Pop.	Note	%±
1980	1,035		—
1990	1,216		17.5%
2000	3,475		185.8%
2010	2,126		−38.8%
2020	2,394		12.6%
U.S. Decennial Census; 1850–1900 1910; 1920 1930 1940; 1950 1960 1970; 1980 1990 2000; 2010 2020

Salado first appeared as a census designated place in the 1980 United States census. After incorporation, it was listed as a village in the 2010 U.S. census. It is part of the Killeen–Temple–Fort Hood metropolitan statistical area.

Salado racial composition as of 2020 (NH = Non-Hispanic) (Note: Note: the US Census treats Hispanic/Latino as an ethnic category. This table excludes Latinos from the racial categories and assigns them to a separate category. Hispanics/Latinos can be of any race.)
Race	Number	Percentage
White (NH)	2,005	83.75%
Black or African American (NH)	21	0.88%
Native American or Alaska Native (NH)	7	0.29%
Asian (NH)	13	0.54%
Some other race (NH)	13	0.54%
Multiracial (NH)	93	3.88%
Hispanic or Latino	242	10.11%
Total	2,394	

As of the 2020 United States census, there were 2,394 people, 990 households, and 761 families residing in the village.

As of the census of 2000, 3,475 people, 1,382 households, and 1,112 families resided in the village. The population density was 204.2 inhabitants per square mile (78.8/km^{2}). The 1,465 housing units averaged 86.1 per square mile (33.2/km^{2}). The racial makeup of the CDP was 92.37% White, 0.26% African American, 0.63% Native American, 0.60% Asian, 0.06% Pacific Islander, 5.15% from other races, and 0.92% from two or more races. Hispanics or Latinos of any race were 8.66% of the population.

Of the 1,382 households, 29.7% had children under 18 living with them, 72.1% were married couples living together, 6.3% had a female householder with no husband present, and 19.5% were not families. About 16.9% of all households were made up of individuals, and 8.7% had someone living alone who was 65 or older. The average household size was 2.51, and the average family size was 2.81.

In the village, the population was distributed as 22.4% under 18, 5.5% from 18 to 24, 23.0% from 25 to 44, 31.3% from 45 to 64, and 17.9% who were 65 or older. The median age was 44 years. For every 100 females, there were 97.0 males. For every 100 females 18 and over, there were 94.0 males.

The median income for a household was $63,646 and for a family was $70,667. Males had a median income of $48,098 versus $26,528 for females. The per capita income was $29,685. About 3.0% of families and 3.8% of the population were below the poverty line, including 2.5% of those under 18 and 4.5% of those 65 or over.

== Education ==
Salado is served by the Salado Independent School District.

The Texas Association of Private and Parochial Schools was headquartered in the Salado Civic Center in downtown Salado.

== Notable people ==
- George Washington Baines was the maternal great-grandfather of U.S. President Lyndon B. Johnson.
- Liz Carpenter, journalist
- Scott Cawthon, former video game developer, creator of the Five Nights at Freddy's series
- Miriam Amanda Ferguson, 29th and 32nd governor of Texas
- James Edward Ferguson, 26th governor of Texas
- Lela and Raymond Howard, an older married couple who disappeared and became the basis for a 1998 hit song "The Way"
- Birdie Robertson Johnson, clubwoman and activist

== See also ==
- Texas Brazos Trail
