= National Register of Historic Places listings in the Capital region of Texas: Other =

This page is one of two listing the National Register of Historic Places listings in Texas's Capital region.

The Capital region is an area of 10 counties defined by the Texas Comptroller for economic reporting in 2022, as mapped here.

The region included 2020 population of 2.4 million, or 8.3 percent of Texas' population, with Austin-Round Rock-Georgetown MSA having 95 percent of the Capital region's population. Travis County alone has 54 percent.

This page includes the nine counties besides Travis County (which includes Austin).

To see all locations together in a map, click on "Map all coordinates using OpenSourceMap" at right.

== Bastrop County ==
	Name on the Register	Image	Date listed	Location	City or town	Description
1	Allen-Bell House	Allen-Bell House	January 25, 1971 (#71000919)	1408 Church St. 30°06′57″N 97°19′18″W	Bastrop	Recorded Texas Historic Landmark
2	August Baron House	August Baron House	December 22, 1978 (#78003277)	1707 Pecan St. 30°07′07″N 97°19′03″W	Bastrop	
3	Ed Bastain-Haralson House	Ed Bastain-Haralson House	December 22, 1978 (#78003350)	1006 Chestnut St. 30°06′39″N 97°18′57″W	Bastrop	Recorded Texas Historic Landmark
4	Bastrop Commercial District	Bastrop Commercial District	December 22, 1978 (#78003262)	Roughly bounded by Church, Water, Spring, and Walnut Sts. 30°06′38″N 97°19′12″W	Bastrop	Includes Recorded Texas Historic Landmarks; 32 buildings
5	Bastrop County Courthouse and Jail Complex	Bastrop County Courthouse and Jail Complex	November 20, 1975 (#75001947)	Bounded by Pine, Walnut, Pecan, and Water Sts. 30°06′33″N 97°19′05″W	Bastrop	State Antiquities Landmark, includes Recorded Texas Historic Landmarks
6	Bastrop State Park	Bastrop State Park	September 25, 1997 (#97001242)	East of Bastrop, bet. TX 21 & 71; 30°06′31″N 97°16′55″W	Bastrop	
7	Judge R. Batts House	Judge R. Batts House	December 22, 1978 (#78003336)	609 Pecan St. 30°06′26″N 97°19′02″W	Bastrop	Church now stands at the site
8	S. L. Brannon House	S. L. Brannon House	December 22, 1978 (#78003264)	1301 Main St. 30°06′50″N 97°19′11″W	Bastrop	
9	R. J. Brieger House	R. J. Brieger House	December 22, 1978 (#78003278)	1508 Hill St. 30°07′00″N 97°18′55″W	Bastrop	Recorded Texas Historic Landmark
10	Jennie Brooks House	Jennie Brooks House	December 22, 1978 (#78003317)	1009 Walnut St. 30°06′30″N 97°18′55″W	Bastrop	
11	Brooks-Wilbarger House	Brooks-Wilbarger House	December 22, 1978 (#78003269)	1403 Main St. 30°06′55″N 97°19′12″W	Bastrop	Recorded Texas Historic Landmark
12	J. C. Buchanan House	J. C. Buchanan House	December 22, 1978 (#78003326)	1010 Pecan St. 30°06′41″N 97°19′04″W	Bastrop	
13	Mary Christian Burleson House		January 30, 2024 (#100009778)	117 Louise Street; 30°21′33″N 97°22′07″W	Elgin	
14	Casino Hall	Casino Hall	December 22, 1978 (#78003291)	NE corner of Farm and Fayette; 30°06′47″N 97°18′45″W	Bastrop	
15	Colorado River Bridge at Bastrop	Colorado River Bridge at Bastrop	July 19, 1990 (#90001031)	State Loop 150 over the Colorado River; 30°06′36″N 97°19′21″W	Bastrop	
16	H. B. Combs House	H. B. Combs House	December 22, 1978 (#78003294)	1208 Church St. 30°06′49″N 97°19′18″W	Bastrop	
17	John Cornelson House	John Cornelson House	December 22, 1978 (#78003301)	702 Main St. 30°06′26″N 97°19′11″W	Bastrop	Recorded Texas Historic Landmark; now the Bastrop County Historical Society Museum
18	Crocheron-McDowall House	Crocheron-McDowall House	April 20, 1978 (#78003357)	1502 Wilson St. 30°06′58″N 97°19′22″W	Bastrop	Recorded Texas Historic Landmark
19	J. T. Crysup House	J. T. Crysup House	December 22, 1978 (#78003274)	1607 Main St. 30°07′03″N 97°19′11″W	Bastrop	
20	George W. Davis House	George W. Davis House	December 22, 1978 (#78003343)	1010 Chestnut St. 30°06′39″N 97°18′55″W	Bastrop	
21	Dawson House	Dawson House	December 22, 1978 (#78003351)	1002 Chestnut St. 30°06′39″N 97°18′58″W	Bastrop	
22	Mary Duval House	Mary Duval House	December 22, 1978 (#78003268)	1502 Pecan St. 30°06′58″N 97°19′04″W	Bastrop	
23	Elgin Commercial Historic District	Elgin Commercial Historic District	February 16, 1996 (#96000024)	Roughly, along Main St., Ave. C, Central and Depot Aves. and 1st and 2nd Sts. 30°20′52″N 97°22′14″W	Elgin	Includes Recorded Texas Historic Landmark
24	Elzner House	Elzner House	December 22, 1978 (#78003302)	800 Main St. 30°06′31″N 97°19′12″W	Bastrop	Recorded Texas Historic Landmark
25	August Elzner House	August Elzner House	December 22, 1978 (#78003273)	1701 Main St. 30°07′05″N 97°19′11″W	Bastrop	
26	Prince Elzner House	Prince Elzner House	December 22, 1978 (#78003283)	1303 Pecan St. 30°06′51″N 97°19′02″W	Bastrop	
27	Erhard House	Erhard House	December 22, 1978 (#78003280)	907 Cedar St. 30°07′02″N 97°19′03″W	Bastrop	
28	A. A. Erhard House	A. A. Erhard House	December 22, 1978 (#78003329)	1106 Pecan St. 30°06′44″N 97°19′04″W	Bastrop	
29	Adolph A. Erhard House	Adolph A. Erhard House	December 22, 1978 (#78003284)	1205 Pecan St. 30°06′48″N 97°19′02″W	Bastrop	Recorded Texas Historic Landmark
30	E. C. Erhard House	E. C. Erhard House	December 22, 1978 (#78003279)	1507 Pecan St. 30°07′00″N 97°19′02″W	Bastrop	
31	Farm House		December 22, 1978 (#78003334)	End of Pecan St. 30°06′03″N 97°18′56″W	Bastrop	Location uncertain
32	Fowler House	Fowler House	December 22, 1978 (#78003321)	1404 Wilson St. 30°06′55″N 97°19′22″W	Bastrop	Recorded Texas Historic Landmark
33	Fowler-Jenkins House	Fowler-Jenkins House	December 22, 1978 (#78003263)	1302 Pecan St. 30°06′50″N 97°19′04″W	Bastrop	Recorded Texas Historic Landmark
34	P. A. Fry House		December 22, 1978 (#78003337)	1403 Emile St. 30°06′22″N 97°18′38″W	Bastrop	Moved from original location to current location across from Emilie School; Location uncertain
35	Rufus A. Green House	Rufus A. Green House	December 22, 1978 (#78003347)	1501 Church St. 30°06′58″N 97°19′16″W	Bastrop	
36	Griesenbeck House	Griesenbeck House	December 22, 1978 (#78003349)	805 Pecan St. 30°06′33″N 97°19′02″W	Bastrop	
37	Alf Griesenbeck House	Alf Griesenbeck House	December 22, 1978 (#78003282)	1302 Hill St. 30°06′51″N 97°18′56″W	Bastrop	
38	Erna Griesenbeck House	Erna Griesenbeck House	December 22, 1978 (#78003338)	908 Pine St. 30°06′35″N 97°19′00″W	Bastrop	
39	R. J. Griesenbeck House	R. J. Griesenbeck House	December 22, 1978 (#78003308)	1005 Chestnut St. 30°06′37″N 97°18′57″W	Bastrop	
40	Dr. C. A. Grimes House	Dr. C. A. Grimes House	December 22, 1978 (#78003355)	1201 Farm St. 30°06′45″N 97°18′49″W	Bastrop	
41	Hall-Sayers-Perkins House	Hall-Sayers-Perkins House	December 22, 1978 (#78003293)	1307 Church St. 30°06′52″N 97°19′16″W	Bastrop	Recorded Texas Historic Landmark
42	Eugene Harlson House	Eugene Harlson House	December 22, 1978 (#78003344)	803 Jefferson St. 30°06′32″N 97°18′58″W	Bastrop	
43	Emelia Hasler House	Emelia Hasler House	December 22, 1978 (#78003307)	1004 Pine St. 30°06′35″N 97°18′57″W	Bastrop	
44	T. A. Hasler House	T. A. Hasler House	December 22, 1978 (#78003330)	1109 Pecan; 30°06′45″N 97°19′02″W	Bastrop	
45	Abraham Wiley Hill House	Abraham Wiley Hill House	March 11, 1971 (#71000920)	5 mi (8.0 km). SW of Hills Prairie; 30°02′53″N 97°18′28″W	Hills Prairie	Recorded Texas Historic Landmark
46	Hopewell School	Hopewell School	June 8, 2015 (#15000334)	690 TX 21 W 30°05′55″N 97°27′41″W	Cedar Creek	
47	House at 1002 Pine	House at 1002 Pine	December 22, 1978 (#78003304)	1002 Pine St. 30°06′35″N 97°18′58″W	Bastrop	
48	House at 1002 Walnut	House at 1002 Walnut	December 22, 1978 (#78003303)	1002 Walnut St. 30°06′31″N 97°18′58″W	Bastrop	
49	House at 1105 Hill	House at 1105 Hill	December 22, 1978 (#78003312)	1105 Hill St. 30°06′45″N 97°18′54″W	Bastrop	
50	House at 1108 Hill	House at 1108 Hill	December 22, 1978 (#78003306)	1108 Hill St. 30°06′45″N 97°18′55″W	Bastrop	
51	House at 1301 Hill	House at 1301 Hill	December 22, 1978 (#78003286)	1301 Hill St. 30°06′51″N 97°18′53″W	Bastrop	
52	House at 1308 Fayette	House at 1308 Fayette	December 22, 1978 (#78003285)	1308 Fayette St. 30°06′53″N 97°18′45″W	Bastrop	
53	House at 1316 Farm	House at 1316 Farm	December 22, 1978 (#78003290)	1316 Farm St. 30°06′47″N 97°18′44″W	Bastrop	
54	House at 311 Pecan	House at 311 Pecan	December 22, 1978 (#78003327)	311 Pecan St. 30°06′14″N 97°19′02″W	Bastrop	
55	House at 604 Elm	House at 604 Elm	December 22, 1978 (#78003310)	604 Elm St. 30°07′09″N 97°19′16″W	Bastrop	
56	House at 806 Jefferson	House at 806 Jefferson	December 22, 1978 (#78003342)	806 Jefferson St. 30°06′32″N 97°18′59″W	Bastrop	Recorded Texas Historic Landmark
57	Houses at 703 and 704 Austin	Houses at 703 and 704 Austin	December 22, 1978 (#78003316)	703 and 704 Austin; 30°06′27″N 97°19′09″W	Bastrop	
58	Hubbard-Trigg House	Hubbard-Trigg House	December 22, 1978 (#78003266)	1508 Pecan St. 30°07′00″N 97°19′04″W	Bastrop	Recorded Texas Historic Landmark
59	Iron Bridge	Iron Bridge	December 22, 1978 (#78003292)	Over Piney Creek on Main St. 30°07′53″N 97°19′16″W	Bastrop	
60	Jenkins House	Jenkins House	December 22, 1978 (#78003345)	801 Pecan St. 30°06′31″N 97°19′02″W	Bastrop	Recorded Texas Historic Landmark
61	Jenkins House	Jenkins House	December 22, 1978 (#78003299)	1710 Main St. 30°07′08″N 97°19′14″W	Bastrop	Recorded Texas Historic Landmark
62	George Washington Jones House		December 22, 1978 (#78003335)	Martin Luther King Jr. Dr. and Mill St. (formerly Fayette St. and Mill St.); 30°06′08″N 97°18′41″W	Bastrop	Location uncertain
63	Oliver P. Jones House	Oliver P. Jones House	December 22, 1978 (#78003331)	1009 Pecan St. 30°06′41″N 97°19′02″W	Bastrop	
64	Jung Storage Building	Jung Storage Building	December 22, 1978 (#78003323)	801 Emilie (corner of Emilie and Water); 30°06′23″N 97°19′07″W	Bastrop	
65	Alf Jung House	Alf Jung House	December 22, 1978 (#78003322)	508 Pecan St. 30°06′22″N 97°19′04″W	Bastrop	
66	Joe Jung House	Joe Jung House	December 22, 1978 (#78003333)	909 Pecan St. 30°06′38″N 97°19′02″W	Bastrop	Recorded Texas Historic Landmark
67	Kerr Community Center	Kerr Community Center	December 22, 1978 (#78003339)	1308 Walnut; 30°06′31″N 97°18′43″W	Bastrop	
68	Beverly and Lula Kerr House	Beverly and Lula Kerr House	December 22, 1978 (#78003356)	1305 Pine St. 30°06′34″N 97°18′43″W	Bastrop	
69	Kleinert House		December 22, 1978 (#78003288)	1801 Hill St. 30°07′09″N 97°18′55″W	Bastrop	Location uncertain
70	Kohler-McPhaul House		December 22, 1978 (#78003275)	1901 Pecan St. 30°07′17″N 97°19′03″W	Bastrop	House missing. Church located at corner of Pecan and Hawthorne is 1903 Pecan.
71	Lower Elgin Road Bridge at Wilbarger Creek	Lower Elgin Road Bridge at Wilbarger Creek	April 10, 2017 (#100000860)	County Road 55 at Wilbarger Creek; 30°13′21″N 97°24′34″W	Utley	
72	H. P. Luckett House	H. P. Luckett House	December 22, 1978 (#78003296)	1402 Church St. 30°06′54″N 97°19′18″W	Bastrop	Recorded Texas Historic Landmark
73	Bartholomew Manlove House	Bartholomew Manlove House	December 22, 1978 (#78003311)	502 Elm St. 30°07′09″N 97°19′20″W	Bastrop	Recorded Texas Historic Landmark
74	Powell C. Maynard House	Powell C. Maynard House	December 22, 1978 (#78003267)	1408 Pecan St. 30°06′56″N 97°19′04″W	Bastrop	
75	W. E. Maynard House	W. E. Maynard House	December 22, 1978 (#78003281)	1310 Hill St. 30°06′54″N 97°18′55″W	Bastrop	
76	Harriet and Charlie McNeil House		December 22, 1978 (#78003276)	1805 Pecan St. 30°07′08″N 97°19′03″W	Bastrop	Location uncertain
77	Marcellus McNeil House	Marcellus McNeil House	December 22, 1978 (#78003298)	1809 Wilson St. 30°07′14″N 97°19′21″W	Bastrop	Demolished and replaced with new house
78	Willis Miley House	Willis Miley House	December 22, 1978 (#78003289)	1320 Farm St. 30°06′47″N 97°18′37″W	Bastrop	
79	MKT Depot		December 22, 1978 (#78003354)	NW Chestnut and Fayette; 30°06′40″N 97°18′46″W	Bastrop	Demolished or moved
80	Old Bastrop Co. Pavilion	Old Bastrop Co. Pavilion	December 22, 1978 (#78003287)	1800 block of Hawthorne; 30°07′16″N 97°18′47″W	Bastrop	
81	L. W. Olive House	L. W. Olive House	December 22, 1978 (#78003270)	1507 Main St. 30°07′00″N 97°19′11″W	Bastrop	
82	Elbert S. Orgain House	Elbert S. Orgain House	December 22, 1978 (#78003300)	1704 Main St. 30°07′06″N 97°19′14″W	Bastrop	
83	Sarah Jane Orgain House	Sarah Jane Orgain House	December 22, 1978 (#78003309)	602 Cedar St. 30°07′00″N 97°19′16″W	Bastrop	
84	Paul D. Page House	Paul D. Page House	December 22, 1978 (#78003272)	1702 Pecan St. 30°07′05″N 97°19′05″W	Bastrop	
85	J. H. Pearcy House	J. H. Pearcy House	December 22, 1978 (#78003271)	1602 Pecan St. 30°07′02″N 97°19′05″W	Bastrop	
86	Phieffer House	Phieffer House	December 22, 1978 (#78003314)	1802 Main St. 30°07′09″N 97°19′14″W	Bastrop	Recorded Texas Historic Landmark
87	J. W. Pledger House	J. W. Pledger House	December 22, 1978 (#78003318)	1704 Wilson St. 30°07′06″N 97°19′22″W	Bastrop	
88	Ploeger-Kerr-White House	Ploeger-Kerr-White House	December 22, 1978 (#78003346)	806 Martin Luther King Jr. Dr (formerly Marion St.); 30°06′33″N 97°18′41″W	Bastrop	
89	Rabensburg House	Rabensburg House	December 22, 1978 (#78003348)	707 Pecan St. 30°06′30″N 97°19′02″W	Bastrop	
90	Mrs. William R. Reding House	Mrs. William R. Reding House	December 22, 1978 (#78003340)	901 Pecan St. 30°06′35″N 97°19′02″W	Bastrop	
91	Gov. Joseph Sayers House	Gov. Joseph Sayers House	December 22, 1978 (#78003297)	1703 Wilson St. 30°07′04″N 97°19′20″W	Bastrop	Recorded Texas Historic Landmark
92	W. F. Schaeffer House	W. F. Schaeffer House	December 22, 1978 (#78003324)	608 Pecan St. 30°06′26″N 97°19′04″W	Bastrop	
93	Smithville Commercial Historic District	Smithville Commercial Historic District	June 17, 1982 (#82004489)	2nd, 3rd, and Main Sts. 30°00′28″N 97°09′35″W	Smithville	36 buildings
94	Smithville Residential Historic District	Smithville Residential Historic District	November 29, 1995 (#95001395)	Roughly bounded by Cleveland, First, Mills, N. 9th, Burleson, Colorado, and the Colorado R. 30°00′33″N 97°09′23″W	Smithville	Includes Recorded Texas Historic Landmarks; 191 buildings
95	Richard Starcke House	Richard Starcke House	December 22, 1978 (#78003315)	710 Water St. 30°06′30″N 97°19′08″W	Bastrop	
96	Richard Starcke House	Richard Starcke House	December 22, 1978 (#78003328)	703 Main St. 30°06′28″N 97°19′10″W	Bastrop	
97	Campbell Taylor and Greenleaf Fisk House	Campbell Taylor and Greenleaf Fisk House	December 22, 1978 (#78003353)	1005 Hill St. 30°06′41″N 97°18′54″W	Bastrop	Recorded Texas Historic Landmark
98	Waugh House	Waugh House	December 22, 1978 (#78003313)	1801 Main St. 30°07′09″N 97°19′12″W	Bastrop	
99	White House	White House	December 22, 1978 (#78003265)	1307 Main St. 30°06′52″N 97°19′11″W	Bastrop	Recorded Texas Historic Landmark
100	Wilke House	Wilke House	December 22, 1978 (#78003341)	807 Pecan St. 30°06′33″N 97°19′02″W	Bastrop	
101	Minnie Wilkes House	Minnie Wilkes House	December 22, 1978 (#78003352)	1101 Hill St. 30°06′43″N 97°18′53″W	Bastrop	

== Blanco County ==
	Name on the Register	Image	Date listed	Location	City or town	Description
1	Blanco Historic District	Blanco Historic District	July 16, 1991 (#91000890)	Roughly bounded by Fifth St., Live Oak St., Town Cr. and rear property lines W of Main St. 30°05′52″N 98°25′20″W	Blanco	Includes State Antiquities Landmark, Recorded Texas Historic Landmarks
2	Adrian Edwards Conn House	Adrian Edwards Conn House	November 19, 1971 (#71000921)	Jct. of U.S. 281 and SW boundary of courthouse square 30°05′49″N 98°25′22″W	Blanco	Part of Blanco Historic District; Recorded Texas Historic Landmark
3	Lyndon B. Johnson National Historical Park	Lyndon B. Johnson National Historical Park	December 2, 1969 (#69000202)	Lyndon B. Johnson National Historical Park; 30°16′31″N 98°24′37″W	Johnson City	Extends into Gillespie County; includes Recorded Texas Historic Landmark
4	Round Mountain Stage-Coach Inn and Stable	Round Mountain Stage-Coach Inn and Stable	March 31, 1978 (#78002896)	RM 962 off U.S. 281; 30°25′41″N 98°20′23″W	Round Mountain	

== Burnet County ==
	Name on the Register	Image	Date listed	Location	City or town	Description
1	Austin and Northwestern Railroad Historic District-Fairland to Llano	Austin and Northwestern Railroad Historic District-Fairland to Llano	October 6, 1997 (#97001161)	Roughly along RR tracks from Fairland to Llano; 30°38′52″N 98°17′44″W	Kingsland	Extends into Llano County
2	Briggs State Bank	Briggs State Bank	August 11, 2000 (#00000885)	176 S. Loop 308 (approx. 0.5 mi. N of jct. with US 183); 30°53′17″N 97°55′28″W	Briggs	Recorded Texas Historic Landmark
3	Burnet County Courthouse	Burnet County Courthouse	November 15, 2000 (#00001384)	220 S. Pierce St. 30°45′25″N 98°13′37″W	Burnet	
4	Krause Spring Site	Krause Spring Site	November 15, 1978 (#78002901)	Address restricted	Spicewood	
5	Louis Page Archeological Site	Louis Page Archeological Site	March 30, 1978 (#78002900)	Address restricted	Marble Falls	
6	Park Road 4 Historic District	Park Road 4 Historic District	February 7, 2011 (#10001221)	Park Road 4 from US 281 to TX 29 & Longhorn Cavern State Park; 30°42′18″N 98°20′09″W	Burnet vicinity	Includes Recorded Texas Historic Landmark
7	Roper Hotel	Roper Hotel	January 8, 1980 (#80004083)	707 3rd St. 30°34′16″N 98°16′31″W	Marble Falls	Recorded Texas Historic Landmark
8	State Highway 29 Bridge at the Colorado River	State Highway 29 Bridge at the Colorado River	October 10, 1996 (#96001116)	TX 29 at the Llano County line 30°44′53″N 98°23′54″W	Buchanan Dam	Extends into Llano County

== Caldwell County ==
	Name on the Register	Image	Date listed	Location	City or town	Description
1	Caldwell County Courthouse Historic District	Caldwell County Courthouse Historic District	January 3, 1978 (#78002902)	Courthouse Sq. and environs 29°53′03″N 97°40′18″W	Lockhart	Includes State Antiquities Landmark, several Recorded Texas Historic Landmarks
2	Emmanuel Episcopal Church	Emmanuel Episcopal Church	June 5, 1974 (#74002065)	SE corner of N. Church and Walnut Sts. 29°53′07″N 97°40′24″W	Lockhart	Recorded Texas Historic Landmark; part of the Caldwell County Courthouse Historic District
3	Lockhart Vocational High School	Lockhart Vocational High School	November 19, 1998 (#98001416)	1104 E. Market St. 29°53′09″N 97°39′47″W	Lockhart	Recorded Texas Historic Landmark
4	Martindale Central Historic District	Martindale Central Historic District	August 13, 2021 (#100006859)	Roughly bounded by Farm-to-Market Rd. 1979, San Marcos R., Madison Ln., and Crockett St. 29°50′27″N 97°50′41″W	Martindale	
5	State Highway 3-A Bridge at Plum Creek	State Highway 3-A Bridge at Plum Creek	October 10, 1996 (#96001107)	US 90-US 183, .5 mi. W of jct. with I-10; 29°39′19″N 97°36′03″W	Luling	
6	M. A. Withers House	M. A. Withers House	August 27, 1976 (#76002013)	W of Lockhart on Borchert Loop Rd. 29°52′15″N 97°43′37″W	Lockhart	
7	Zedler Mill Historic District	Zedler Mill Historic District	January 9, 2024 (#100009739)	1115 and 1170 South Laurel Avenue; 29°40′04″N 97°39′04″W	Luling	

== Fayette County ==
	Name on the Register	Image	Date listed	Location	City or town	Description
1	Bedstead Truss Bridge	Bedstead Truss Bridge	November 29, 2013 (#13000888)	0.1 mi. NW. of jct. of Hillje & Kallus Sts. 29°40′27″N 96°54′39″W	Schulenburg	State Antiquities Landmark, Recorded Texas Historic Landmark; formerly the Mulberry Creek Bridge, originally listed on the National Register in 1975 (listing number 75001976), removed in May 2013 due to relocation.
2	Bethlehem Lutheran Church	Bethlehem Lutheran Church	August 10, 1978 (#78002928)	White St. 30°03′46″N 96°41′58″W	Round Top	Recorded Texas Historic Landmark
3	Cummins Creek Bridge	Cummins Creek Bridge	April 21, 1975 (#75001975)	2 mi (3.2 km). NW of Round Top over Cummins Creek; 30°04′07″N 96°43′09″W	Round Top	State Antiquities Landmark; replaced in 1996
4	Dubina Historic District	Dubina Historic District	September 27, 2003 (#03000970)	Roughly bounded by FM 1383 and Cty Rd. 480; 29°43′44″N 96°50′08″W	Dubina	
5	East Navidad River Bridge	East Navidad River Bridge	August 18, 2014 (#14000497)	FM 1579 at East Navidad River; 29°40′59″N 96°50′47″W	Schulenburg	
6	Nathaniel W. Faison House	Nathaniel W. Faison House	March 11, 2010 (#08000538)	822 S. Jefferson; 29°53′57″N 96°52′22″W	La Grange	Recorded Texas Historic Landmark
7	Fayette County Courthouse and Jail	Fayette County Courthouse and Jail	January 23, 1975 (#75001973)	Courthouse Sq. and 104 Main St. 29°54′19″N 96°52′43″W	La Grange	State Antiquities Landmark, includes Recorded Texas Historic Landmark; part of Fayette County Courthouse Square Historic District
8	Fayette County Courthouse Square Historic District	Fayette County Courthouse Square Historic District	January 16, 2001 (#00001664)	Roughly bounded by Main, Lafayette, Franklin, Colorado, Jefferson, Washington, and Crockett Sts. 29°54′17″N 96°52′39″W	La Grange	Includes Recorded Texas Historic Landmarks
9	Fayetteville Historic District	Fayetteville Historic District	July 10, 2008 (#08000657)	Roughly bounded by E. Bell, N. Thompson (FM 1291), E. Fayette, E. Main (SH 159), Post Oak Lane, 29°54′26″N 96°40′26″W	Fayetteville	Includes Recorded Texas Historic Landmarks
10	Flatonia Historic District	Flatonia Historic District	June 26, 2017 (#100001223)	Roughly bounded by N. Main, 7th, Middle, Market, 6th, Penn, S. Main & Faires Sts. 29°41′15″N 97°06′31″W	Flatonia	Includes Recorded Texas Historic Landmarks
11	Mier Expedition and Dawson's Men Monument and Tomb	Mier Expedition and Dawson's Men Monument and Tomb	March 6, 2019 (#100003486)	414 TX Loop 92, Monument Hill and Kreische Brewery State Historic Sites. 29°53′20″N 96°52′37″W	La Grange	State Historic Site, State Antiquities Landmark
12	Henry L. Kreische Brewery and House	Henry L. Kreische Brewery and House	April 16, 1975 (#75001974)	S of La Grange off U.S. 77 on Monument Hill; 29°53′23″N 96°52′29″W	La Grange	State Historic Site, State Antiquities Landmark
13	Nativity of Mary, Blessed Virgin Catholic Church	Nativity of Mary, Blessed Virgin Catholic Church	June 21, 1983 (#83003136)	FM 2672; 29°43′03″N 96°55′40″W	High Hill	
14	William Neese Sr. Homestead	William Neese Sr. Homestead	February 18, 1975 (#75001977)	On TX 237; 30°01′06″N 96°43′54″W	Warrenton	
15	Sengelmann Hall and City Meat Market Building	Sengelmann Hall and City Meat Market Building	June 18, 2009 (#09000451)	527 and 529-533 N. Main St. 29°40′47″N 96°54′19″W	Schulenburg	
16	Simon Pytlovany House		April 14, 1975 (#75001972)	1.5 mi (2.4 km). S of Dubina on FR 1383; 29°42′45″N 96°50′20″W	Dubina	
17	Schulenburg Cotton Compress	Schulenburg Cotton Compress	September 13, 1979 (#79002938)	James and Main Sts. 29°40′43″N 96°54′45″W	Schulenburg	
18	St. James Episcopal Church	St. James Episcopal Church	June 18, 1976 (#76002026)	Monroe and Colorado Sts. 29°54′29″N 96°52′25″W	La Grange	Recorded Texas Historic Landmark
19	St. John the Baptist Catholic Church	St. John the Baptist Catholic Church	June 21, 1983 (#83003137)	FM 1383; 29°47′14″N 96°51′32″W	Ammannsville	
20	St. Mary's Church of the Assumption	St. Mary's Church of the Assumption	June 21, 1983 (#83003138)	FM 1295; 29°40′11″N 97°04′00″W	Praha	
21	State Highway 71 Bridge at the Colorado River	State Highway 71 Bridge at the Colorado River	October 10, 1996 (#96001120)	TX 71, .8 mi E of jct. with FM 609; 29°54′05″N 96°53′12″W	La Grange	
22	Winedale Inn Complex	Winedale Inn Complex	June 22, 1970 (#70000745)	Off FM 1457; 30°05′11″N 96°38′29″W	Winedale	State Antiquities Landmark, includes Recorded Texas Historic Landmark; now a division of The Center for American History, The University of Texas at Austin
23	Zapp Building	Zapp Building	June 23, 1983 (#83003139)	Fayette and Washington Sts. 29°54′15″N 96°40′37″W	Fayetteville	Recorded Texas Historic Landmark; part of Fayetteville Historic District; brick two-story Romanesque Revival mercantile building and emporium constructed in 1900.

== Hays County ==
	Name on the Register	Image	Date listed	Location	City or town	Description
1	Barber House	Barber House	August 26, 1983 (#83004489)	1000 Burleson St. 29°52′45″N 97°57′13″W	San Marcos	Historic Resources of San Marcos MRA
2	Belger-Cahill Lime Kiln	Belger-Cahill Lime Kiln	August 26, 1983 (#83004490)	Lime Kiln Rd. 29°53′59″N 97°55′35″W	San Marcos	Historic Resources of San Marcos MRA
3	Belvin Street Historic District	Belvin Street Historic District	December 1, 1983 (#83003792)	700, 800, 900 blocks of Belvin St., and 227 Mitchell St. 29°52′44″N 97°57′03″W	San Marcos	Includes Recorded Texas Historic Landmarks; Historic Resources of San Marcos MRA
4	Bunton Branch Bridge	Bunton Branch Bridge	February 19, 2002 (#02000086)	Cty. Rd. 210, approx. 0.2 mi (0.32 km). NW of jct. with IH-35 at Bunton Overpass; 30°01′05″N 97°51′31″W	Kyle	State Antiquities Landmark, Recorded Texas Historic Landmark
5	Burleson-Knispel House		August 3, 1979 (#79002975)	1.5 mi (2.4 km). N of San Marcos on Lime Kiln Rd; 29°54′43″N 97°55′43″W	San Marcos	Recorded Texas Historic Landmark
6	Caldwell House	Caldwell House	August 26, 1983 (#83004491)	619 Maury St. 29°53′00″N 97°57′05″W	San Marcos	Historic Resources of San Marcos MRA
7	Camp Ben McCulloch	Camp Ben McCulloch	October 12, 2004 (#04001151)	18301 Ranch Rd. 1826; 30°07′45″N 98°00′52″W	Driftwood	
8	Cape House	Cape House	August 26, 1983 (#83004492)	316 W. Hopkins St. 29°52′59″N 97°56′40″W	San Marcos	Recorded Texas Historic Landmark; Historic Resources of San Marcos MRA
9	Cemetery Chapel, San Marcos Cemetery	Cemetery Chapel, San Marcos Cemetery	December 1, 1983 (#83003793)	TX 12; 29°53′12″N 97°57′27″W	San Marcos	Recorded Texas Historic Landmark; Historic Resources of San Marcos MRA
10	Cen-Tex Wool Mill Historic District	Cen-Tex Wool Mill Historic District	June 1, 2005 (#05000520)	101 Uhland Rd. 29°54′02″N 97°54′59″W	San Marcos	
11	Cock House	Cock House	April 2, 1973 (#73001966)	400 E. Hopkins St. 29°53′00″N 97°56′14″W	San Marcos	State Antiquities Landmark, Recorded Texas Historic Landmark
12	John R. Dobie House	John R. Dobie House	August 18, 1992 (#92001024)	282 Old Kyle Rd. 29°59′48″N 98°05′34″W	Wimberley	Recorded Texas Historic Landmark
13	Cora Jackman Donalson House	Cora Jackman Donalson House	October 28, 2010 (#10000864)	200 S. Sledge St. 29°59′18″N 97°52′47″W	Kyle	Recorded Texas Historic Landmark; Rural Properties of Hays County, Texas MPS
14	Downtown Buda Historic District	Downtown Buda Historic District	November 7, 2003 (#03001126)	Roughly bounded by Elm St., Main St., China St., and Austin St. 30°04′54″N 97°50′36″W	Buda	
15	Dripping Springs Downtown Historic District	Dripping Springs Downtown Historic District	July 17, 2013 (#13000504)	100-500 blk. Mercer, 100 blk. Wallace, 100 blk. San Marcos & 101 College Sts., 101-103 Old Fitzhugh Rd. 30°11′34″N 98°05′21″W	Dripping Springs	Includes Recorded Texas Historic Landmarks
16	Dunbar Historic District		November 27, 2024 (#100011049)	Roughly bounded by South Fredericksburg Street, West Martin Luther King Drive, Herndon Street, and Centre Street; 29°52′45″N 97°56′36″W	San Marcos	
17	Episcopalian Rectory	Episcopalian Rectory	August 26, 1983 (#83004493)	225 W. Hopkins St. 29°52′57″N 97°56′37″W	San Marcos	Historic Resources of San Marcos MRA
18	Farmers Union Gin Company	Farmers Union Gin Company	August 26, 1983 (#83004494)	120 Grove St. 29°52′33″N 97°56′25″W	San Marcos	Recorded Texas Historic Landmark; Historic Resources of San Marcos MRA
19	Fire Station and City Hall	Fire Station and City Hall	August 26, 1983 (#83004495)	224 N. Guadalupe St. 29°53′02″N 97°56′28″W	San Marcos	Historic Resources of San Marcos MRA
20	First United Methodist Church	First United Methodist Church	November 8, 1974 (#74002269)	129 W. Hutchison; 29°53′02″N 97°56′34″W	San Marcos	Recorded Texas Historic Landmark
21	Fisher Hall		August 26, 1983 (#83004496)	1132 Belvin St. 29°52′35″N 97°57′16″W	San Marcos	Recorded Texas Historic Landmark; Historic Resources of San Marcos MRA; destroyed by fire in 2007
22	Fort Street Presbyterian Church	Fort Street Presbyterian Church	March 23, 1984 (#84001860)	516 W. Hopkins St. 29°52′55″N 97°56′48″W	San Marcos	Recorded Texas Historic Landmark; Historic Resources of San Marcos MRA
23	Four Winns Ranch		May 29, 2018 (#100002472)	234 & 236 Winn Valley Dr. 29°58′16″N 98°06′29″W	Wimberley	
24	Harry Freeman Site	Harry Freeman Site	November 7, 1978 (#78002953)	Address restricted	San Marcos	
25	Goforth-Harris House	Goforth-Harris House	August 26, 1983 (#83004497)	401 Comanche St. 29°53′06″N 97°56′40″W	San Marcos	Recorded Texas Historic Landmark; Historic Resources of San Marcos MRA
26	Isham Jones Good Homestead	Isham Jones Good Homestead	August 20, 2004 (#04000896)	13401 Evergreen Way; 30°10′09″N 97°57′43″W	Austin	
27	Green and Faris Buildings	Green and Faris Buildings	August 26, 1983 (#83004498)	136-144 E. San Antonio St. 29°52′56″N 97°56′25″W	San Marcos	Historic Resources of San Marcos MRA; part of Hays County Courthouse Historic District
28	Hardy-Williams Building	Hardy-Williams Building	August 26, 1983 (#83004499)	127 E. Hopkins St. 29°53′00″N 97°56′27″W	San Marcos	Historic Resources of San Marcos MRA; part of Hays County Courthouse Historic District
29	Hays County Courthouse	Hays County Courthouse	May 23, 1980 (#80004134)	Public Sq. 29°52′56″N 97°56′25″W	San Marcos	State Antiquities Landmark; part of Hays County Courthouse Historic District
30	Hays County Courthouse Historic District	Hays County Courthouse Historic District	September 10, 1992 (#92001233)	Roughly bounded by the alleys behind N. Guadalupe, E. Hopkins, N. LBJ and E. San Antonio Sts. 29°52′57″N 97°56′25″W	San Marcos	Historic Resources of San Marcos MRA
31	Hays County Jail	Hays County Jail	August 26, 1983 (#83004500)	170 S Fredericksburg St. 29°52′50″N 97°56′33″W	San Marcos	State Antiquities Landmark; Historic Resources of San Marcos MRA
32	Heard House	Heard House	August 26, 1983 (#83004501)	620 W. San Antonio St. 29°52′46″N 97°56′48″W	San Marcos	Recorded Texas Historic Landmark; Historic Resources of San Marcos MRA
33	Augusta Hofheinz House	Augusta Hofheinz House	August 26, 1983 (#83004502)	1104 W. Hopkins St. 29°52′35″N 97°57′10″W	San Marcos	Recorded Texas Historic Landmark; Historic Resources of San Marcos MRA
34	Walter Hofheinz House	Walter Hofheinz House	December 1, 1983 (#83003794)	819 W. Hopkins St. 29°52′42″N 97°57′00″W	San Marcos	Historic Resources of San Marcos MRA
35	Hutchison House	Hutchison House	August 26, 1983 (#83004503)	LBJ Dr. and University St. 29°53′08″N 97°56′25″W	San Marcos	Recorded Texas Historic Landmark; Historic Resources of San Marcos MRA
36	Johnson House	Johnson House	August 26, 1983 (#83004504)	1030 Belvin St. 29°52′37″N 97°57′12″W	San Marcos	Recorded Texas Historic Landmark; Historic Resources of San Marcos MRA
37	Kone-Cliett House	Kone-Cliett House	December 1, 1983 (#83003795)	724 Burleson St. 29°52′52″N 97°57′05″W	San Marcos	Recorded Texas Historic Landmark; Historic Resources of San Marcos MRA
38	Kyle City Hall	Kyle City Hall	May 22, 2002 (#02000528)	109 Burleson Rd. 29°59′18″N 97°52′37″W	Kyle	State Antiquities Landmark; Rural Properties of Hays County, Texas MPS
39	Claiborne Kyle Log House	Claiborne Kyle Log House	May 28, 1981 (#81000630)	SW of Kyle; 29°57′55″N 97°54′08″W	Kyle vicinity	State Antiquities Landmark, Recorded Texas Historic Landmark
40	James C. Lane House	James C. Lane House	November 29, 2010 (#10000961)	306 Wimberley Square; 29°59′43″N 98°05′51″W	Wimberley	Recorded Texas Historic Landmark; Rural Properties of Hays County, Texas MPS
41	Main Building, Southwest Texas Normal School	Main Building, Southwest Texas Normal School	August 26, 1983 (#83004505)	Old Main St., Texas State University; 29°53′21″N 97°56′19″W	San Marcos	State Antiquities Landmark, Recorded Texas Historic Landmark; Historic Resources of San Marcos MRA; 1903 Victorian Gothic building designed by Edward Northcraft; first building of the Southwest Texas State Normal School (now known as Texas State University)
42	McKie-Bass Building	McKie-Bass Building	December 1, 1983 (#83003797)	111 N. Guadalupe St. 29°52′57″N 97°56′29″W	San Marcos	Historic Resources of San Marcos MRA; part of Hays County Courthouse Historic District
43	M.G. Michaelis Ranch	M.G. Michaelis Ranch	March 7, 2003 (#02001212)	3600 FM 150 West; 30°01′42″N 97°55′24″W	Kyle	Rural Properties of Hays County, Texas MPS
44	Moore Grocery Company	Moore Grocery Company	August 26, 1983 (#83004506)	101 S. Edward Gary St. 29°52′56″N 97°56′18″W	San Marcos	Historic Resources of San Marcos MRA
45	Ruskin C. Norman Site (41 HY 86)	Ruskin C. Norman Site (41 HY 86)	November 21, 1978 (#78002954)	Address restricted	San Marcos	
46	Onion Creek Post Office and Stagecoach House	Onion Creek Post Office and Stagecoach House	October 27, 2002 (#02001211)	109 N. Loop 4; 30°05′23″N 97°50′13″W	Buda	State Antiquities Landmark, Recorded Texas Historic Landmark; Rural Properties of Hays County, Texas MPS
47	Pettey House	Pettey House	June 20, 2008 (#08000541)	714 Burleson St. 29°52′53″N 97°57′03″W	San Marcos	Historic Resources of San Marcos MRA
48	Katherine Anne Porter House	Katherine Anne Porter House	August 20, 2004 (#04000893)	508 W. Center St. 29°59′22″N 97°52′49″W	Kyle	Rural Properties of Hays County, Texas MPS
49	Dr. Joseph M. and Sarah Pound Farmstead	Dr. Joseph M. and Sarah Pound Farmstead	July 28, 1995 (#95000929)	Ranch Rd. 12 N. 30°12′02″N 98°04′50″W	Dripping Springs	
50	Ragsdale-Jackman-Yarbough House	Ragsdale-Jackman-Yarbough House	August 26, 1983 (#83004507)	621 W. San Antonio St. 29°52′45″N 97°56′47″W	San Marcos	Recorded Texas Historic Landmark; Historic Resources of San Marcos MRA
51	Rylander-Kyle House	Rylander-Kyle House	August 26, 1983 (#83004508)	711 W. San Antonio St. 29°52′43″N 97°56′49″W	San Marcos	Recorded Texas Historic Landmark; Historic Resources of San Marcos MRA
52	San Marcos Colored School Home Economics Building		September 9, 2024 (#100010800)	801 W. Martin Luther King Drive; 29°52′35″N 97°56′50″W	San Marcos	
53	San Marcos Milling Company	San Marcos Milling Company	December 1, 1983 (#83003799)	Nicola Alley; 29°52′33″N 97°56′18″W	San Marcos	Historic Resources of San Marcos MRA
54	San Marcos Telephone Company	San Marcos Telephone Company	August 26, 1983 (#83004509)	138 W. San Antonio St. 29°52′56″N 97°56′32″W	San Marcos	Historic Resources of San Marcos MRA. Demolished in 2019.
55	Simon Building	Simon Building	August 26, 1983 (#83004510)	124-126 W. Hopkins St. 29°52′59″N 97°56′32″W	San Marcos	Historic Resources of San Marcos MRA
56	Smith House	Smith House	August 26, 1983 (#83004511)	322 Scott St. 29°52′53″N 97°56′59″W	San Marcos	Historic Resources of San Marcos MRA
57	Williams-Tarbutton House	Williams-Tarbutton House	August 26, 1983 (#83004512)	626 Lindsey St. 29°52′57″N 97°57′04″W	San Marcos	Historic Resources of San Marcos MRA
58	Wimberley Downtown Square Historic District		February 18, 2025 (#100010422)	Roughly bounded by Cypress Creek, Old Kyle Road, Henson Road, and Rio Bonlo Road; 29°59′47″N 98°05′49″W	Wimberley	
59	Winters-Wimberley House	Winters-Wimberley House	May 22, 2002 (#02000527)	14070 Ranch Road 12; 29°59′53″N 98°05′54″W	Wimberley	Rural Properties of Hays County, Texas MPS

== Lee County ==
	Name on the Register	Image	Date listed	Location	City or town	Description
1	Droemer Brickyard Site	Droemer Brickyard Site	November 7, 1979 (#79002991)	1 mi (1.6 km). SW of Giddings on Old Serbin Rd; 30°10′21″N 96°57′07″W	Giddings	Kiln and other structures of local brick making business from 1924 to 1940
2	Lee County Courthouse	Lee County Courthouse	May 30, 1975 (#75001998)	Bounded by Hempstead, Grimes, E. Richmond, and Main Sts. 30°10′53″N 96°56′14″W	Giddings	State Antiquities Landmark, Recorded Texas Historic Landmark; designed in 1898 by J. Riely Gordon in Richardsonian Romanesque style
3	Schubert House	Schubert House	August 25, 1970 (#70000753)	183 Hempstead St. 30°10′55″N 96°56′12″W	Giddings	Recorded Texas Historic Landmark; two-story late Greek Revival house built about 1879; also known as the Fletcher House and now the Lee County Heritage Center

== Llano County ==
	Name on the Register	Image	Date listed	Location	City or town	Description
1	Austin and Northwestern Railroad Historic District-Fairland to Llano	Austin and Northwestern Railroad Historic District-Fairland to Llano	October 6, 1997 (#97001161)	Roughly along RR tracks from Fairland to Llano; 30°39′38″N 98°26′12″W	Kingsland	Includes Recorded Texas Historic Landmark; extends into Burnet County
2	Badu Building	Badu Building	June 6, 1980 (#80004139)	601 Bessemer Ave. 30°45′24″N 98°40′34″W	Llano	Recorded Texas Historic Landmark
3	Enchanted Rock Archeological District	Enchanted Rock Archeological District	August 29, 1984 (#84001740)	Off Ranch Rd 965 at the Llano-Gillespie County Line; 30°30′16″N 98°49′05″W	Fredericksburg	National Natural Landmark; extends into Gillespie County
4	Llano County Courthouse and Jail	Llano County Courthouse and Jail	December 2, 1977 (#77001459)	Public Sq., Oatman and Haynie Sts. 30°44′59″N 98°40′35″W	Llano	Contains Recorded Texas Historic Landmarks including one State Antiquities Landmark; the courthouse is within the Llano County Courthouse Historic District
5	Llano County Courthouse Historic District	Llano County Courthouse Historic District	February 10, 1989 (#88002542)	Roughly bounded by the Llano River, Ford St., Sandstone St., and Berry St. 30°45′05″N 98°40′34″W	Llano	Contains Recorded Texas Historic Landmarks including one State Antiquities Landmark
6	Southern Hotel	Southern Hotel	October 10, 1979 (#79002992)	201 W. Main St; 30°45′01″N 98°40′38″W	Llano	Recorded Texas Historic Landmark
7	State Highway 29 Bridge at the Colorado River	State Highway 29 Bridge at the Colorado River	October 10, 1996 (#96001116)	TX 29 at the Llano County line 30°44′53″N 98°23′54″W	Buchanan Dam	Extends into Burnet County

== Williamson County ==
	Name on the Register	Image	Date listed	Location	City or town	Description
1	Martin C. Amos House	Martin C. Amos House	April 29, 1986 (#86000989)	1408 Olive; 30°37′53″N 97°40′01″W	Georgetown	Recorded Texas Historic Landmark; part of Olive Street Historic District; Historic Resources of Georgetown MRA
2	Arnold-Torbet House	Arnold-Torbet House	April 29, 1986 (#86000990)	908 Pine; 30°38′07″N 97°40′13″W	Georgetown	Historic Resources of Georgetown MRA
3	Atkinson House	Atkinson House	April 29, 1986 (#86000992)	911 Walnut; 30°38′08″N 97°40′13″W	Georgetown	Recorded Texas Historic Landmark; Historic Resources of Georgetown MRA
4	Bartlett Commercial Historic District	Bartlett Commercial Historic District	September 30, 1980 (#80004076)	E. Clark St. 30°47′42″N 97°25′37″W	Bartlett	Extends into Bell County
5	Belford Historic District	Belford Historic District	April 29, 1986 (#86000991)	Roughly bounded by University Ave., Main, E. Eighteenth, and Austin; 30°37′48″N 97°40′39″W	Georgetown	Includes Recorded Texas Historic Landmarks; Historic Resources of Georgetown MRA
6	Bowlen House		January 14, 1986 (#86000180)	1405 Forest; 30°37′53″N 97°40′44″W	Georgetown	Historic Resources of Georgetown MRA; house no longer present
7	Bryson Stage Coach Stop	Bryson Stage Coach Stop	December 1, 1978 (#78003000)	Northwest of Liberty Hill on TX 29; 30°40′40″N 97°56′37″W	Liberty Hill	Recorded Texas Historic Landmark
8	Burcham House	Burcham House	April 29, 1986 (#86000993)	1310 College; 30°37′54″N 97°40′19″W	Georgetown	Recorded Texas Historic Landmark; Historic Resources of Georgetown MRA
9	Casey House	Casey House	January 14, 1986 (#86000184)	705 E. Third; 30°38′27″N 97°40′12″W	Georgetown	Historic Resources of Georgetown MRA
10	Caswell House	Caswell House	April 29, 1986 (#86000994)	207 E. Ninth; 30°38′09″N 97°40′31″W	Georgetown	Historic Resources of Georgetown MRA
11	Chesser-Morgan House	Chesser-Morgan House	January 14, 1986 (#86000185)	1202 E. Fifteenth; 30°37′49″N 97°39′56″W	Georgetown	Part of Olive Street Historic District; Historic Resources of Georgetown MRA
12	Jesse and Sara Cooper House	Jesse and Sara Cooper House	February 16, 1996 (#96000073)	1.8 mi (2.9 km). east of Georgetown Hwy. 29; 30°38′32″N 97°38′48″W	Georgetown	Recorded Texas Historic Landmark; Historic Resources of Georgetown MRA
13	E. M. Daughtrey House		April 29, 1986 (#86000984)	1316 E. University; 30°37′58″N 97°39′47″W	Georgetown	Historic Resources of Georgetown MRA; Moved or demolished
14	Dr. James L. Dickey House	Dr. James L. Dickey House	February 21, 2017 (#100000675)	500 Burkett Rd. 30°34′20″N 97°24′18″W	Taylor	Destroyed by fire July 10, 2022
15	John J. Dimmitt House	John J. Dimmitt House	February 16, 1996 (#96000076)	W. University (TX 29) 0.5 mi. west of the junction with Austin Highway. 30°38′05″N 97°41′12″W	Georgetown	Recorded Texas Historic Landmark; Historic Resources of Georgetown MRA
16	S. A. Easley House	S. A. Easley House	April 29, 1986 (#86000983)	1310 Olive; 30°37′55″N 97°40′02″W	Georgetown	Recorded Texas Historic Landmark; part of Olive Street Historic District; Historic Resources of Georgetown MRA
17	First Methodist Church	First Methodist Church	June 17, 1986 (#86001368)	410 E. University; 30°37′58″N 97°40′23″W	Georgetown	Recorded Texas Historic Landmark; Historic Resources of Georgetown MRA
18	D. D. Fowler House	D. D. Fowler House	April 29, 1986 (#86000985)	1531 Ash; 30°37′45″N 97°40′21″W	Georgetown	Historic Resources of Georgetown MRA
19	Georgetown Light and Water Works	Georgetown Light and Water Works	February 16, 1996 (#96000074)	403 W. 9th 30°38′10″N 97°40′49″W	Georgetown	Historic Resources of Georgetown MRA
20	Harper-Chesser House	Harper-Chesser House	April 29, 1986 (#86000969)	1309 College; 30°37′54″N 97°40′17″W	Georgetown	Historic Resources of Georgetown MRA
21	Moses Harrell House	Moses Harrell House	January 14, 1986 (#86000169)	1001 Church; 30°38′04″N 97°40′32″W	Georgetown	Historic Resources of Georgetown MRA
22	E. M. Harris House	E. M. Harris House	January 14, 1986 (#86000168)	404 E. Seventh; 30°38′13″N 97°40′24″W	Georgetown	Historic Resources of Georgetown MRA
23	A. W. Hawnen House	A. W. Hawnen House	April 29, 1986 (#86000967)	1409 Olive; 30°37′54″N 97°39′59″W	Georgetown	Part of Olive Street Historic District; Historic Resources of Georgetown MRA
24	M. S. Hewitt House	M. S. Hewitt House	February 16, 1996 (#96000071)	1019 S. College; 30°38′01″N 97°40′24″W	Georgetown	Historic Resources of Georgetown MRA
25	House at 214 W. University	House at 214 W. University	April 29, 1986 (#86000987)	214 W. University; 30°37′58″N 97°40′41″W	Georgetown	Historic Resources of Georgetown MRA
26	House at 801 West	House at 801 West	January 14, 1986 (#86000172)	801 West; 30°38′10″N 97°40′52″W	Georgetown	Historic Resources of Georgetown MRA
27	House at 907 Pine	House at 907 Pine	January 14, 1986 (#86000171)	907 Pine; 30°38′09″N 97°40′11″W	Georgetown	Historic Resources of Georgetown MRA
28	Hutto Commercial Historic District	Hutto Commercial Historic District	August 4, 2011 (#11000515)	101-205 East St., 202 Farley St. & 204 US 79; 30°32′38″N 97°31′50″W	Hutto	
29	Dr. Robert Hyer House	Dr. Robert Hyer House	January 14, 1986 (#86000175)	904 Ash; 30°38′07″N 97°40′23″W	Georgetown	Historic Resources of Georgetown MRA
30	Imhoff House	Imhoff House	January 14, 1986 (#86000176)	208 Austin; 30°38′27″N 97°40′41″W	Georgetown	Historic Resources of Georgetown MRA
31	Inn at Brushy Creek	Inn at Brushy Creek	October 15, 1970 (#70000777)	Taylor Exit off U.S. 79, off I-35; 30°30′57″N 97°41′22″W	Round Rock	
32	George Irvine House	George Irvine House	April 29, 1986 (#86000973)	409 E. University; 30°38′00″N 97°40′24″W	Georgetown	Recorded Texas Historic Landmark; Historic Resources of Georgetown MRA
33	J. J. Johnson Farm		January 14, 1986 (#86000178)	Rabbitt Hill Rd. 30°34′59″N 97°40′18″W	Georgetown	Historic Resources of Georgetown MRA; house no longer present
34	Kenney's Fort Site (41WM465)	Kenney's Fort Site (41WM465)	April 20, 1987 (#87000565)	Address restricted	Round Rock	
35	Lane-Riley House	Lane-Riley House	April 29, 1986 (#86000975)	1302 College; 30°37′55″N 97°40′19″W	Georgetown	Recorded Texas Historic Landmark; Historic Resources of Georgetown MRA
36	Will and Mary Leake House	Will and Mary Leake House	April 29, 1986 (#86000976)	313 E. Seventh; 30°38′14″N 97°40′26″W	Georgetown	Historic Resources of Georgetown MRA
37	John Leavell House	John Leavell House	April 29, 1986 (#86000979)	803 College; 30°38′12″N 97°40′18″W	Georgetown	Historic Resources of Georgetown MRA
38	M. B. and Annie Lockett House	M. B. and Annie Lockett House	April 29, 1986 (#86000981)	811 E. University; 30°38′00″N 97°40′08″W	Georgetown	Historic Resources of Georgetown MRA
39	Frank and Mellie Love House	Frank and Mellie Love House	April 29, 1986 (#86000977)	1415 Ash; 30°37′50″N 97°40′20″W	Georgetown	Historic Resources of Georgetown MRA
40	W. K. and Kate Makemson House	W. K. and Kate Makemson House	January 14, 1986 (#86000190)	1002 Ash; 30°38′04″N 97°40′23″W	Georgetown	Historic Resources of Georgetown MRA
41	McFadin House	McFadin House	April 9, 1980 (#80004160)	North of Taylor; 30°38′18″N 97°25′33″W	Taylor	Recorded Texas Historic Landmark
42	McKnight-Ebb House		January 14, 1986 (#86000191)	502 W. Eighteenth; 30°37′34″N 97°40′53″W	Georgetown	Historic Resources of Georgetown MRA; Moved or demolished
43	McMurray House	McMurray House	January 14, 1986 (#86000192)	611 Church; 30°38′13″N 97°40′30″W	Georgetown	Historic Resources of Georgetown MRA
44	Capt. Nelson Merrell House	Capt. Nelson Merrell House	October 15, 1970 (#70000778)	Northeast of Round Rock on U.S. 79; 30°31′02″N 97°39′41″W	Round Rock	
45	Miller-Ellyson House	Miller-Ellyson House	January 14, 1986 (#86000193)	303 E. Ninth; 30°38′09″N 97°40′28″W	Georgetown	Historic Resources of Georgetown MRA
46	Old Georgetown High School	Old Georgetown High School	January 14, 1986 (#86000195)	507 E. University; 30°38′01″N 97°40′20″W	Georgetown	Recorded Texas Historic Landmark; Historic Resources of Georgetown MRA
47	Olive Street Historic District	Olive Street Historic District	August 20, 2013 (#13000615)	Olive St. between E. University Ave. & 17th St. plus a portion of E. 15th St. 30°37′51″N 97°40′01″W	Georgetown	Includes Recorded Texas Historic Landmarks; Historic Resources of Georgetown MRA
48	Paige-DeCrow-Weir House	Paige-DeCrow-Weir House	January 14, 1986 (#86000194)	I-35 and State Route 2243; 30°37′24″N 97°41′30″W	Georgetown	Recorded Texas Historic Landmark; Historic Resources of Georgetown MRA
49	Woodson and Margaret Patrick House	Woodson and Margaret Patrick House	January 14, 1986 (#86000197)	211 E. Fifth; 30°38′21″N 97°40′31″W	Georgetown	Historic Resources of Georgetown MRA
50	Pegues House	Pegues House	January 14, 1986 (#86000196)	904 E. University; 30°37′59″N 97°40′07″W	Georgetown	Historic Resources of Georgetown MRA
51	Preslar-Hewitt Building	Preslar-Hewitt Building	May 1, 2003 (#03000331)	321-323 N. Main; 30°34′13″N 97°24′35″W	Taylor	Recorded Texas Historic Landmark; part of Taylor Downtown Historic District
52	R. H. and Martha Price House	R. H. and Martha Price House	April 29, 1986 (#86000982)	209 E. Tenth; 30°38′05″N 97°40′31″W	Georgetown	Historic Resources of Georgetown MRA
53	Railroad Produce Depot	Railroad Produce Depot	November 7, 1979 (#79003024)	401 W. 6th St. 30°38′18″N 97°40′49″W	Georgetown	State Antiquities Landmark
54	J. H. Reedy House	J. H. Reedy House	April 29, 1986 (#86000949)	908 E. University; 30°37′59″N 97°40′06″W	Georgetown	Historic Resources of Georgetown MRA
55	Round Rock Commercial Historic District	Round Rock Commercial Historic District	June 9, 1983 (#83003170)	100 and 200 blocks of E. Main St. 30°30′30″N 97°40′39″W	Round Rock	Includes Recorded Texas Historic Landmarks
56	Round Rock Post Office and William M. Owen House	Round Rock Post Office and William M. Owen House	July 7, 1983 (#83003171)	Chisholm Trail and Emanuel St. 30°30′55″N 97°41′24″W	Round Rock	Recorded Texas Historic Landmark
57	Rouser House	Rouser House	January 14, 1986 (#86000198)	602 Myrtle; 30°38′16″N 97°40′30″W	Georgetown	Historic Resources of Georgetown MRA
58	Saint John's Methodist Church	Saint John's Methodist Church	April 29, 1986 (#86000950)	301 E University Ave; 30°38′01″N 97°40′29″W	Georgetown	Historic Resources of Georgetown MRA
59	Sansom-Schmalenbeck House		January 14, 1986 (#86000199)	813 Church; 30°38′09″N 97°40′32″W	Georgetown	Historic Resources of Georgetown MRA; Demolished or moved
60	Saxon Motor Car Store	Saxon Motor Car Store	June 17, 1986 (#86001366)	316 E. Sixth St. 30°38′17″N 97°40′27″W	Georgetown	Historic Resources of Georgetown MRA
61	A. W. Sillure House	A. W. Sillure House	April 29, 1986 (#86000951)	1414 Ash; 30°37′50″N 97°40′23″W	Georgetown	Recorded Texas Historic Landmark; Historic Resources of Georgetown MRA
62	Southwestern University Administration Building and Mood Hall	Southwestern University Administration Building and Mood Hall	April 23, 1975 (#75002013)	1001 E. University Ave., Southwestern University campus 30°38′00″N 97°40′01″W	Georgetown	Recorded Texas Historic Landmark
63	Robert and Lula Stone House	Robert and Lula Stone House	January 14, 1986 (#86000200)	1102 Ash; 30°38′01″N 97°40′23″W	Georgetown	Historic Resources of Georgetown MRA
64	Taylor Downtown Historic District	Taylor Downtown Historic District	October 26, 2005 (#05001193)	Roughly bounded by 5th, Washburn, 1st & Vance Sts. 30°34′16″N 97°24′36″W	Taylor	Includes Recorded Texas Historic Landmarks
65	Taylor High School Campus	Taylor High School Campus	May 17, 2018 (#100002437)	410 W. 7th St. 30°34′07″N 97°24′51″W	Taylor	
66	Taylor National Bank	Taylor National Bank	May 23, 1980 (#80004159)	200 Main St. 30°34′07″N 97°24′33″W	Taylor	Recorded Texas Historic Landmark; part of Taylor Downtown Historic District
67	Taylor-Cooper House	Taylor-Cooper House	January 14, 1986 (#86000203)	105 E 5th 30°38′22″N 97°40′36″W	Georgetown	Historic Resources of Georgetown MRA
68	Tinnen House	Tinnen House	August 25, 1970 (#70000776)	1220 Austin St. 30°37′53″N 97°40′37″W	Georgetown	Part of Belford Historic District
69	University Avenue-Elm Street Historic District	University Avenue-Elm Street Historic District	December 6, 1979 (#79003025)	E. University and Elm Sts. 30°37′44″N 97°40′18″W	Georgetown	Includes Recorded Texas Historic Landmarks
70	W. C. and Kate Vaden House	W. C. and Kate Vaden House	April 29, 1986 (#86000952)	711 E. University; 30°38′01″N 97°40′13″W	Georgetown	Recorded Texas Historic Landmark; Historic Resources of Georgetown MRA
71	Wesley Chapel A.M.E Church	Wesley Chapel A.M.E Church	January 14, 1986 (#86000204)	508 W. Fourth; 30°38′24″N 97°40′53″W	Georgetown	Recorded Texas Historic Landmark; Historic Resources of Georgetown MRA
72	D. K. and Inez Wilcox House	D. K. and Inez Wilcox House	April 29, 1986 (#86000954)	1307 Olive; 30°37′55″N 97°40′00″W	Georgetown	Part of Olive Street Historic District; Historic Resources of Georgetown MRA
73	Wilcox-Graves House	Wilcox-Graves House	April 29, 1986 (#86000953)	1403 Olive; 30°37′55″N 97°39′59″W	Georgetown	Part of Olive Street Historic District; Historic Resources of Georgetown MRA
74	Williamson County Courthouse Historic District	Williamson County Courthouse Historic District	July 26, 1977 (#77001480); April 29, 1986 boundary increase (#86000955)	Rock and 9th Sts., Main and 7th Sts. (includes both sides); 30°38′12″N 97°40′39″W	Georgetown	Includes State Antiquities Landmark, Recorded Texas Historic Landmarks; Historic Resources of Georgetown MRA (boundary increase)
75	Zidell House	Zidell House	May 12, 2009 (#09000308)	2015 W. Lake Dr. 30°34′33″N 97°25′53″W	Taylor	
