= National Register of Historic Places listings in Hays County, Texas =

Location of Hays County in Texas

This is a list of the National Register of Historic Places listings in Hays County, Texas.

This is intended to be a complete list of properties and districts listed on the National Register of Historic Places in Hays County, Texas. There are ten districts and 49 individual properties listed on the National Register in the county. The individually listed properties include eight State Antiquities Landmarks and 23 Recorded Texas Historic Landmarks while two districts contains several more Recorded Texas Historic Landmarks.

This National Park Service list is complete through NPS recent listings posted July 17, 2026.

== Current listings ==
The publicly disclosed locations of National Register properties and districts may be seen in a mapping service provided.

	Name on the Register	Image	Date listed	Location	City or town	Description
1	Barber House	Barber House	August 26, 1983 (#83004489)	1000 Burleson St. 29°52′45″N 97°57′13″W	San Marcos	Historic Resources of San Marcos MRA
2	Belger-Cahill Lime Kiln	Belger-Cahill Lime Kiln	August 26, 1983 (#83004490)	Lime Kiln Rd. 29°53′59″N 97°55′35″W	San Marcos	Historic Resources of San Marcos MRA
3	Belvin Street Historic District	Belvin Street Historic District	December 1, 1983 (#83003792)	700, 800, 900 blocks of Belvin St., and 227 Mitchell St. 29°52′44″N 97°57′03″W	San Marcos	Includes Recorded Texas Historic Landmarks; Historic Resources of San Marcos MRA
4	Bunton Branch Bridge	Bunton Branch Bridge	February 19, 2002 (#02000086)	Cty. Rd. 210, approx. 0.2 mi (0.32 km). NW of jct. with IH-35 at Bunton Overpass; 30°01′05″N 97°51′31″W	Kyle	State Antiquities Landmark, Recorded Texas Historic Landmark
5	Burleson-Knispel House		August 3, 1979 (#79002975)	1.5 mi (2.4 km). N of San Marcos on Lime Kiln Rd; 29°54′43″N 97°55′43″W	San Marcos	Recorded Texas Historic Landmark
6	Caldwell House	Caldwell House	August 26, 1983 (#83004491)	619 Maury St. 29°53′00″N 97°57′05″W	San Marcos	Historic Resources of San Marcos MRA
7	Camp Ben McCulloch	Camp Ben McCulloch	October 12, 2004 (#04001151)	18301 Ranch Rd. 1826; 30°07′45″N 98°00′52″W	Driftwood	
8	Cape House	Cape House	August 26, 1983 (#83004492)	316 W. Hopkins St. 29°52′59″N 97°56′40″W	San Marcos	Recorded Texas Historic Landmark; Historic Resources of San Marcos MRA
9	Cemetery Chapel, San Marcos Cemetery	Cemetery Chapel, San Marcos Cemetery	December 1, 1983 (#83003793)	TX 12; 29°53′12″N 97°57′27″W	San Marcos	Recorded Texas Historic Landmark; Historic Resources of San Marcos MRA
10	Cen-Tex Wool Mill Historic District	Cen-Tex Wool Mill Historic District	June 1, 2005 (#05000520)	101 Uhland Rd. 29°54′02″N 97°54′59″W	San Marcos	
11	Cock House	Cock House	April 2, 1973 (#73001966)	400 E. Hopkins St. 29°53′00″N 97°56′14″W	San Marcos	State Antiquities Landmark, Recorded Texas Historic Landmark
12	John R. Dobie House	John R. Dobie House	August 18, 1992 (#92001024)	282 Old Kyle Rd. 29°59′48″N 98°05′34″W	Wimberley	Recorded Texas Historic Landmark
13	Cora Jackman Donalson House	Cora Jackman Donalson House	October 28, 2010 (#10000864)	200 S. Sledge St. 29°59′18″N 97°52′47″W	Kyle	Recorded Texas Historic Landmark; Rural Properties of Hays County, Texas MPS
14	Downtown Buda Historic District	Downtown Buda Historic District	November 7, 2003 (#03001126)	Roughly bounded by Elm St., Main St., China St., and Austin St. 30°04′54″N 97°50′36″W	Buda	
15	Dripping Springs Downtown Historic District	Dripping Springs Downtown Historic District	July 17, 2013 (#13000504)	100-500 blk. Mercer, 100 blk. Wallace, 100 blk. San Marcos & 101 College Sts., 101-103 Old Fitzhugh Rd. 30°11′34″N 98°05′21″W	Dripping Springs	Includes Recorded Texas Historic Landmarks
16	Dunbar Historic District	Dunbar Historic District	November 27, 2024 (#100011049)	Roughly bounded by South Fredericksburg Street, West Martin Luther King Drive, Herndon Street, and Centre Street; 29°52′45″N 97°56′36″W	San Marcos	
17	Episcopalian Rectory	Episcopalian Rectory	August 26, 1983 (#83004493)	225 W. Hopkins St. 29°52′57″N 97°56′37″W	San Marcos	Historic Resources of San Marcos MRA
18	Farmers Union Gin Company	Farmers Union Gin Company	August 26, 1983 (#83004494)	120 Grove St. 29°52′33″N 97°56′25″W	San Marcos	Recorded Texas Historic Landmark; Historic Resources of San Marcos MRA
19	Fire Station and City Hall	Fire Station and City Hall	August 26, 1983 (#83004495)	224 N. Guadalupe St. 29°53′02″N 97°56′28″W	San Marcos	Historic Resources of San Marcos MRA
20	First United Methodist Church	First United Methodist Church	November 8, 1974 (#74002269)	129 W. Hutchison; 29°53′02″N 97°56′34″W	San Marcos	Recorded Texas Historic Landmark
21	Fisher Hall		August 26, 1983 (#83004496)	1132 Belvin St. 29°52′35″N 97°57′16″W	San Marcos	Recorded Texas Historic Landmark; Historic Resources of San Marcos MRA; destroyed by fire in 2007
22	Fort Street Presbyterian Church	Fort Street Presbyterian Church	March 23, 1984 (#84001860)	516 W. Hopkins St. 29°52′55″N 97°56′48″W	San Marcos	Recorded Texas Historic Landmark; Historic Resources of San Marcos MRA
23	Four Winns Ranch		May 29, 2018 (#100002472)	234 & 236 Winn Valley Dr. 29°58′16″N 98°06′29″W	Wimberley	
24	Harry Freeman Site	Harry Freeman Site	November 7, 1978 (#78002953)	Address restricted	San Marcos	
25	Goforth-Harris House	Goforth-Harris House	August 26, 1983 (#83004497)	401 Comanche St. 29°53′06″N 97°56′40″W	San Marcos	Recorded Texas Historic Landmark; Historic Resources of San Marcos MRA
26	Isham Jones Good Homestead	Isham Jones Good Homestead	August 20, 2004 (#04000896)	13401 Evergreen Way; 30°10′09″N 97°57′43″W	Austin	
27	Green and Faris Buildings	Green and Faris Buildings	August 26, 1983 (#83004498)	136-144 E. San Antonio St. 29°52′56″N 97°56′25″W	San Marcos	Historic Resources of San Marcos MRA; part of Hays County Courthouse Historic District
28	Hardy-Williams Building	Hardy-Williams Building	August 26, 1983 (#83004499)	127 E. Hopkins St. 29°53′00″N 97°56′27″W	San Marcos	Historic Resources of San Marcos MRA; part of Hays County Courthouse Historic District
29	Hays County Courthouse	Hays County Courthouse	May 23, 1980 (#80004134)	Public Sq. 29°52′56″N 97°56′25″W	San Marcos	State Antiquities Landmark; part of Hays County Courthouse Historic District
30	Hays County Courthouse Historic District	Hays County Courthouse Historic District	September 10, 1992 (#92001233)	Roughly bounded by the alleys behind N. Guadalupe, E. Hopkins, N. LBJ and E. San Antonio Sts. 29°52′57″N 97°56′25″W	San Marcos	Historic Resources of San Marcos MRA
31	Hays County Jail	Hays County Jail	August 26, 1983 (#83004500)	170 S Fredericksburg St. 29°52′50″N 97°56′33″W	San Marcos	State Antiquities Landmark; Historic Resources of San Marcos MRA
32	Heard House	Heard House	August 26, 1983 (#83004501)	620 W. San Antonio St. 29°52′46″N 97°56′48″W	San Marcos	Recorded Texas Historic Landmark; Historic Resources of San Marcos MRA
33	Augusta Hofheinz House	Augusta Hofheinz House	August 26, 1983 (#83004502)	1104 W. Hopkins St. 29°52′35″N 97°57′10″W	San Marcos	Recorded Texas Historic Landmark; Historic Resources of San Marcos MRA
34	Walter Hofheinz House	Walter Hofheinz House	December 1, 1983 (#83003794)	819 W. Hopkins St. 29°52′42″N 97°57′00″W	San Marcos	Historic Resources of San Marcos MRA
35	Hutchison House	Hutchison House	August 26, 1983 (#83004503)	LBJ Dr. and University St. 29°53′08″N 97°56′25″W	San Marcos	Recorded Texas Historic Landmark; Historic Resources of San Marcos MRA
36	Johnson House	Johnson House	August 26, 1983 (#83004504)	1030 Belvin St. 29°52′37″N 97°57′12″W	San Marcos	Recorded Texas Historic Landmark; Historic Resources of San Marcos MRA
37	Kone-Cliett House	Kone-Cliett House	December 1, 1983 (#83003795)	724 Burleson St. 29°52′52″N 97°57′05″W	San Marcos	Recorded Texas Historic Landmark; Historic Resources of San Marcos MRA
38	Kyle City Hall	Kyle City Hall	May 22, 2002 (#02000528)	109 Burleson Rd. 29°59′18″N 97°52′37″W	Kyle	State Antiquities Landmark; Rural Properties of Hays County, Texas MPS
39	Claiborne Kyle Log House	Claiborne Kyle Log House	May 28, 1981 (#81000630)	SW of Kyle; 29°57′55″N 97°54′08″W	Kyle vicinity	State Antiquities Landmark, Recorded Texas Historic Landmark
40	James C. Lane House	James C. Lane House	November 29, 2010 (#10000961)	306 Wimberley Square; 29°59′43″N 98°05′51″W	Wimberley	Recorded Texas Historic Landmark; Rural Properties of Hays County, Texas MPS
41	Main Building, Southwest Texas Normal School	Main Building, Southwest Texas Normal School	August 26, 1983 (#83004505)	Old Main St., Texas State University; 29°53′21″N 97°56′19″W	San Marcos	State Antiquities Landmark, Recorded Texas Historic Landmark; Historic Resources of San Marcos MRA; 1903 Victorian Gothic building designed by Edward Northcraft; first building of the Southwest Texas State Normal School (now known as Texas State University)
42	McKie-Bass Building	McKie-Bass Building	December 1, 1983 (#83003797)	111 N. Guadalupe St. 29°52′57″N 97°56′29″W	San Marcos	Historic Resources of San Marcos MRA; part of Hays County Courthouse Historic District
43	M.G. Michaelis Ranch	M.G. Michaelis Ranch	March 7, 2003 (#02001212)	3600 FM 150 West; 30°01′42″N 97°55′24″W	Kyle	Rural Properties of Hays County, Texas MPS
44	Moore Grocery Company	Moore Grocery Company	August 26, 1983 (#83004506)	101 S. Edward Gary St. 29°52′56″N 97°56′18″W	San Marcos	Historic Resources of San Marcos MRA
45	Ruskin C. Norman Site (41 HY 86)	Ruskin C. Norman Site (41 HY 86)	November 21, 1978 (#78002954)	Address restricted	San Marcos	
46	Onion Creek Post Office and Stagecoach House	Onion Creek Post Office and Stagecoach House	October 27, 2002 (#02001211)	109 N. Loop 4; 30°05′23″N 97°50′13″W	Buda	State Antiquities Landmark, Recorded Texas Historic Landmark; Rural Properties of Hays County, Texas MPS
47	Pettey House	Pettey House	June 20, 2008 (#08000541)	714 Burleson St. 29°52′53″N 97°57′03″W	San Marcos	Historic Resources of San Marcos MRA
48	Katherine Anne Porter House	Katherine Anne Porter House	August 20, 2004 (#04000893)	508 W. Center St. 29°59′22″N 97°52′49″W	Kyle	Rural Properties of Hays County, Texas MPS
49	Dr. Joseph M. and Sarah Pound Farmstead	Dr. Joseph M. and Sarah Pound Farmstead	July 28, 1995 (#95000929)	Ranch Rd. 12 N. 30°12′02″N 98°04′50″W	Dripping Springs	
50	Ragsdale-Jackman-Yarbough House	Ragsdale-Jackman-Yarbough House	August 26, 1983 (#83004507)	621 W. San Antonio St. 29°52′45″N 97°56′47″W	San Marcos	Recorded Texas Historic Landmark; Historic Resources of San Marcos MRA
51	Rylander-Kyle House	Rylander-Kyle House	August 26, 1983 (#83004508)	711 W. San Antonio St. 29°52′43″N 97°56′49″W	San Marcos	Recorded Texas Historic Landmark; Historic Resources of San Marcos MRA
52	San Marcos Colored School Home Economics Building	San Marcos Colored School Home Economics Building	September 9, 2024 (#100010800)	801 W. Martin Luther King Drive; 29°52′35″N 97°56′50″W	San Marcos	
53	San Marcos Milling Company	San Marcos Milling Company	December 1, 1983 (#83003799)	Nicola Alley; 29°52′33″N 97°56′18″W	San Marcos	Historic Resources of San Marcos MRA
54	San Marcos Telephone Company	San Marcos Telephone Company	August 26, 1983 (#83004509)	138 W. San Antonio St. 29°52′56″N 97°56′32″W	San Marcos	Historic Resources of San Marcos MRA. Demolished in 2019.
55	Simon Building	Simon Building	August 26, 1983 (#83004510)	124-126 W. Hopkins St. 29°52′59″N 97°56′32″W	San Marcos	Historic Resources of San Marcos MRA
56	Smith House	Smith House	August 26, 1983 (#83004511)	322 Scott St. 29°52′53″N 97°56′59″W	San Marcos	Historic Resources of San Marcos MRA
57	Williams-Tarbutton House	Williams-Tarbutton House	August 26, 1983 (#83004512)	626 Lindsey St. 29°52′57″N 97°57′04″W	San Marcos	Historic Resources of San Marcos MRA
58	Wimberley Downtown Square Historic District	Wimberley Downtown Square Historic District	February 18, 2025 (#100010422)	Roughly bounded by Cypress Creek, Old Kyle Road, Henson Road, and Rio Bonlo Road; 29°59′47″N 98°05′49″W	Wimberley	
59	Winters-Wimberley House	Winters-Wimberley House	May 22, 2002 (#02000527)	14070 Ranch Road 12; 29°59′53″N 98°05′54″W	Wimberley	Rural Properties of Hays County, Texas MPS

== Former listings ==
	Name on the Register	Image	Date listed	Date removed	Location	City or town	Description
1	Negro School		March 23, 1984 (#84001868)	September 28, 1987	Comal and Endicott Sts.	San Marcos	Historic Resources of San Marcos MRA. Also known as Dunbar School.

== See also ==
- National Register of Historic Places listings in Texas
- Recorded Texas Historic Landmarks in Hays County
