= Downtown Buda Historic District =

Historic district in Texas, United States

- U.S. National Register of Historic Places
- U.S. Historic district
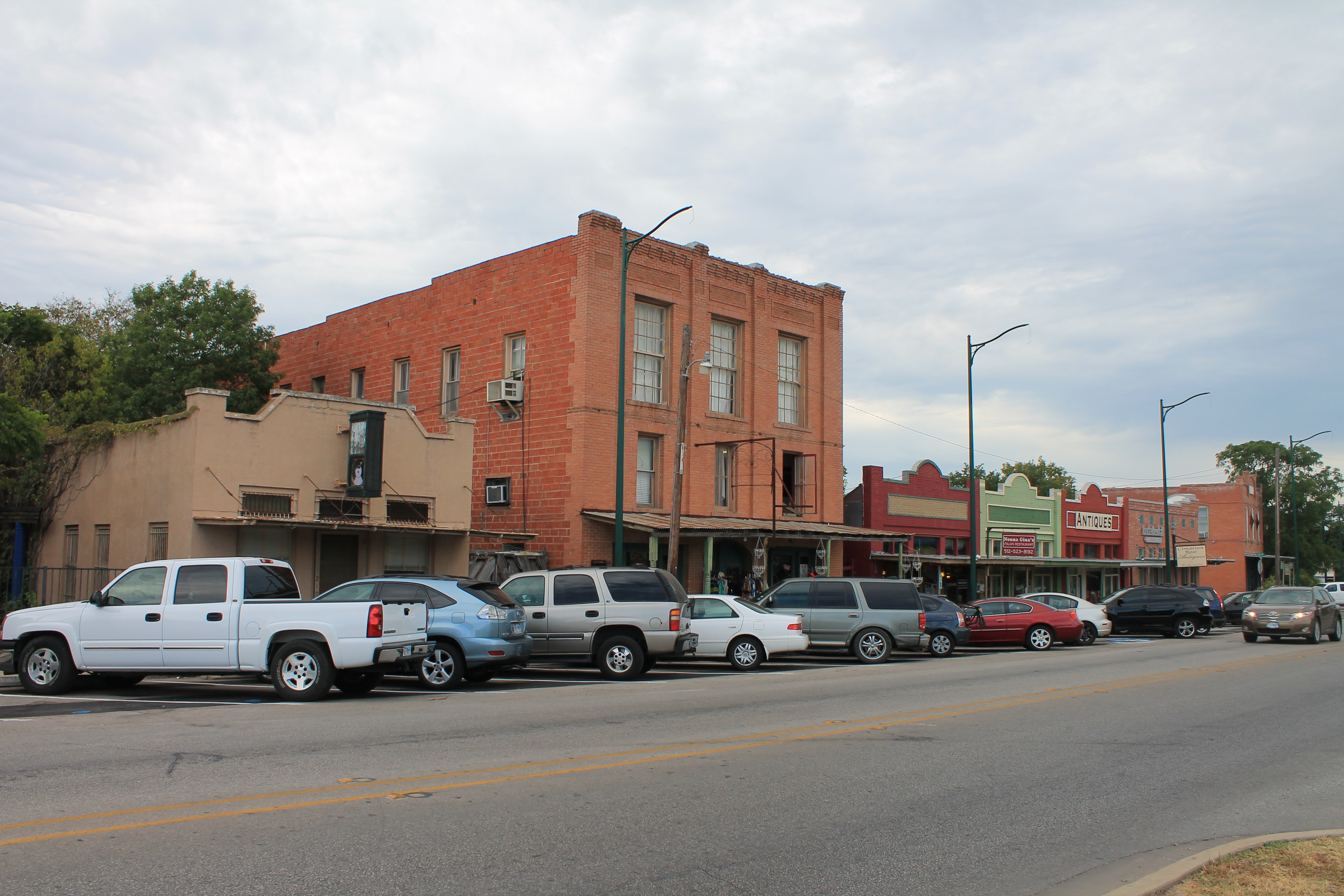
- Downtown Buda Historic District in 2012

- Location within Texas Location within the United States
- Location: Roughly bounded by Elm St., Main St., China St., and Austin St., Buda, Texas
- Coordinates: 30°4′54″N 97°50′36″W
- Area: 15 acres (6.1 ha)
- Built: 1881
- Built by: Dave Garison, Thomas Howe
- Architectural style: Early Commercial, Bungalow/Craftsman
- NRHP reference No.: 03001126
- Added to NRHP: November 7, 2003

Downtown Buda Historic District is a six-block historic commercial area located in Buda, Texas. The oldest building dates from 1881 when the town was created with the arrival of the International-Great Northern Railroad (I&GN). The town experienced moderate success for the next forty years, but the downtown area never grew beyond its track-side beginnings.

Twenty-eight buildings contribute to the historic district, most date from the early 1900s, the most recent is from 1934. The district was added to the National Register of Historic Places in November 7, 2003 as an example of a late 19th to early 20th century railroad town.

== Photo gallery ==
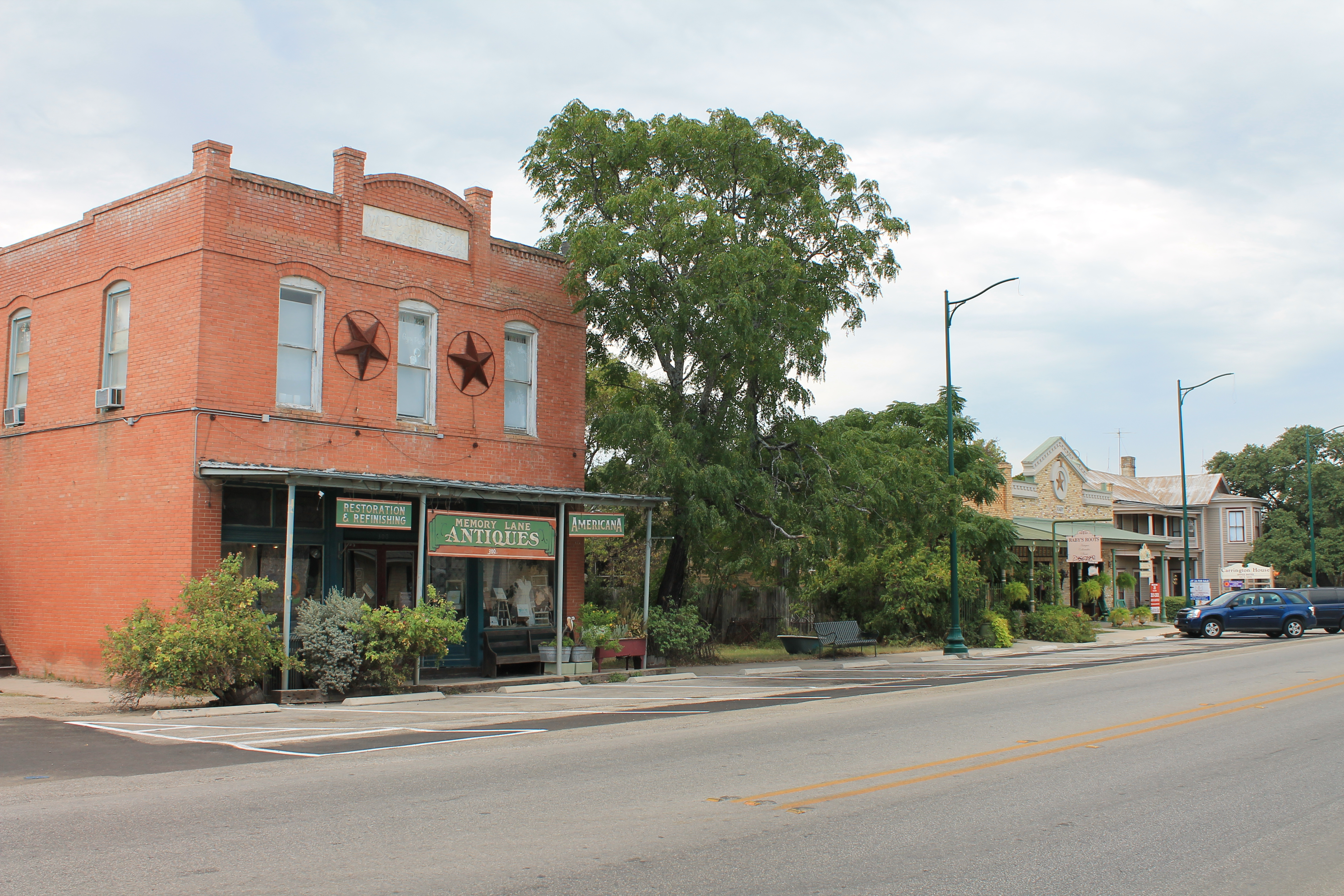

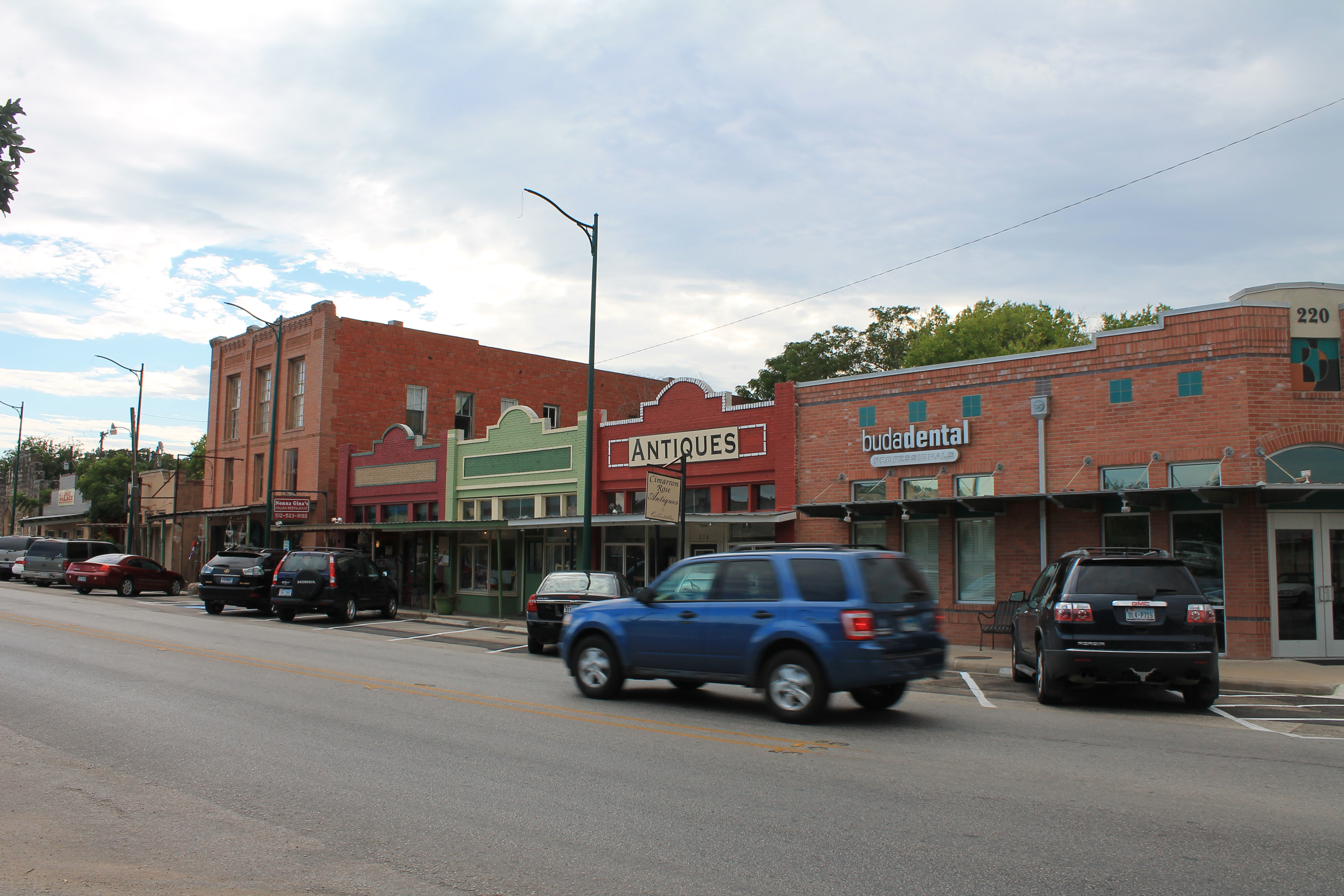

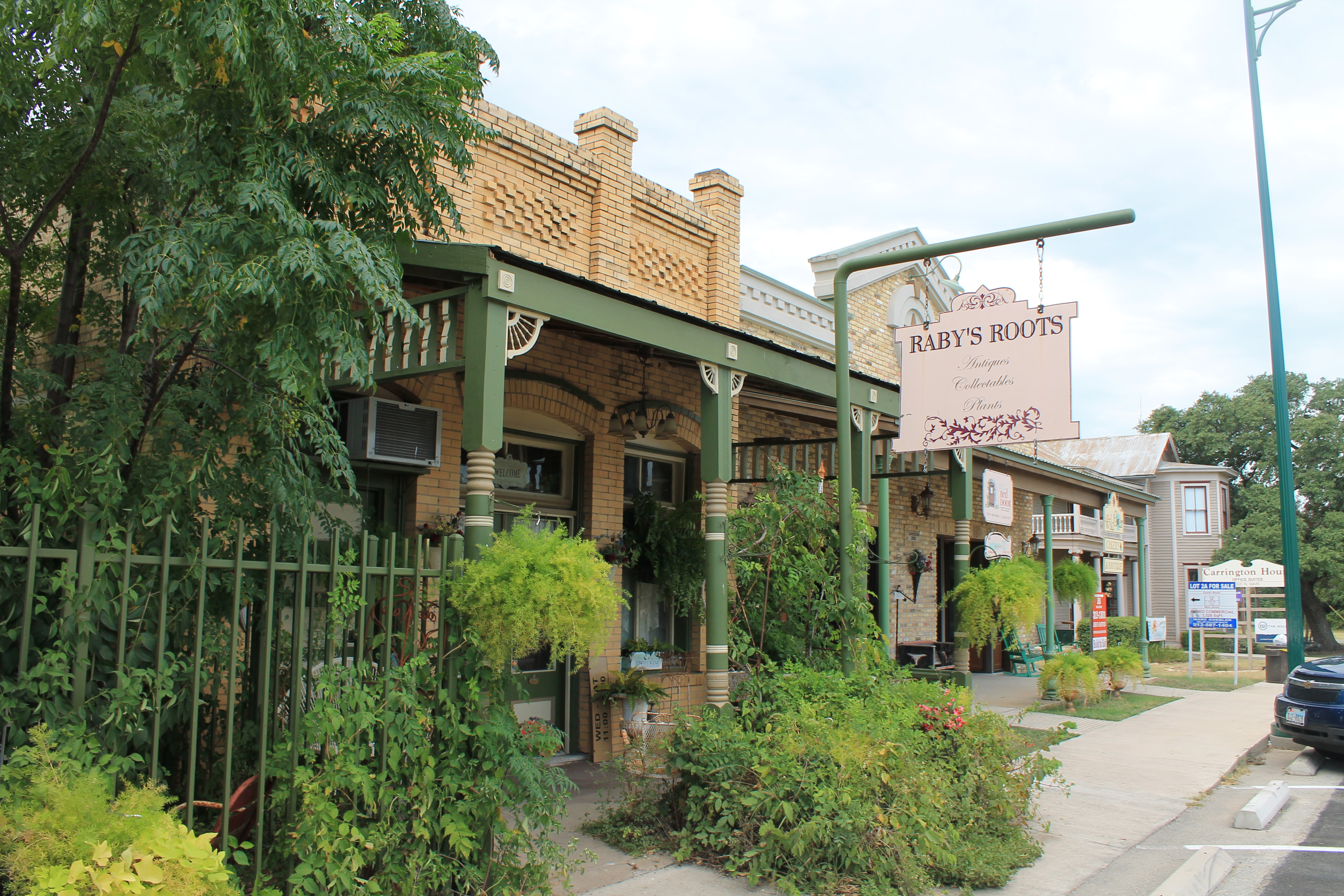

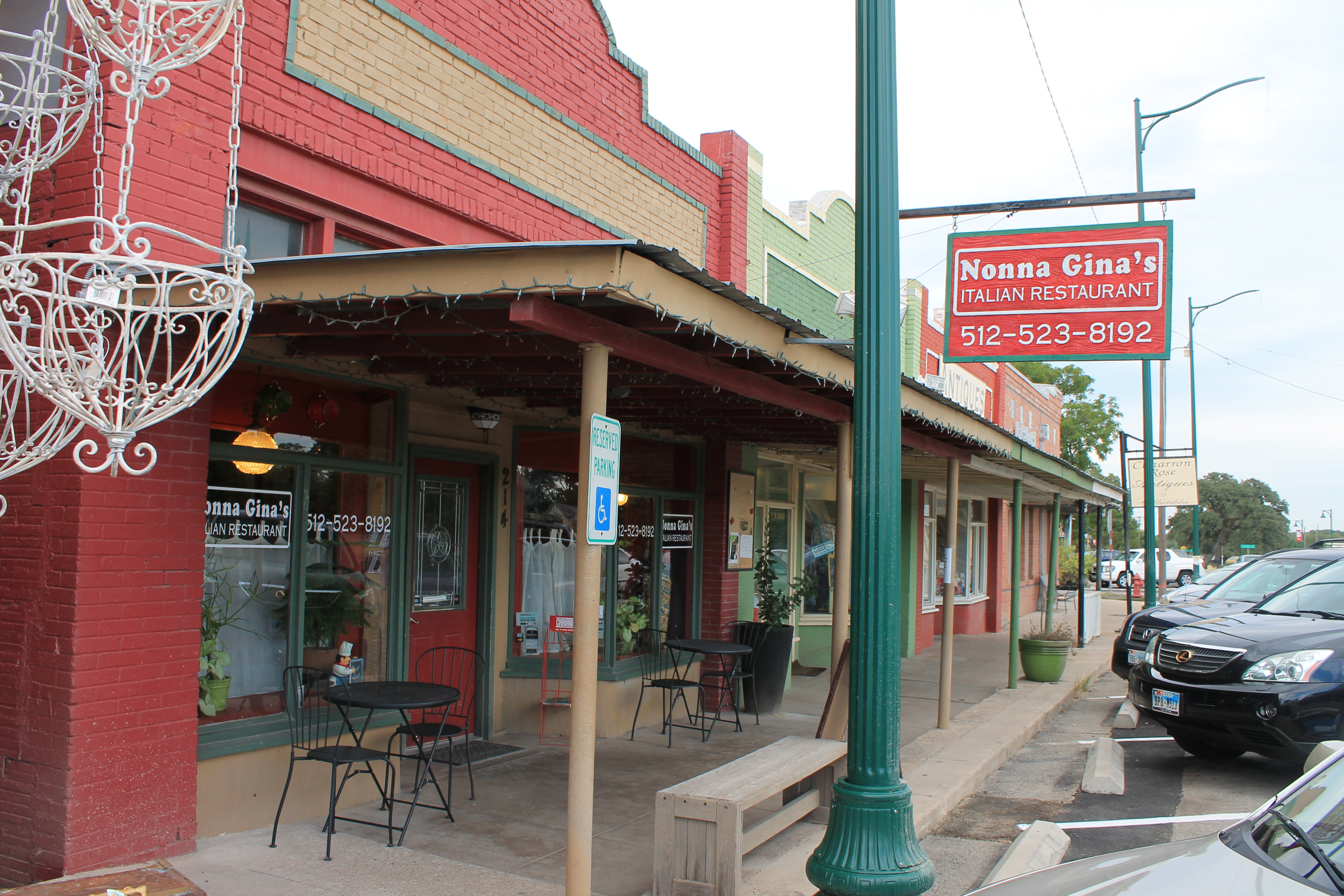

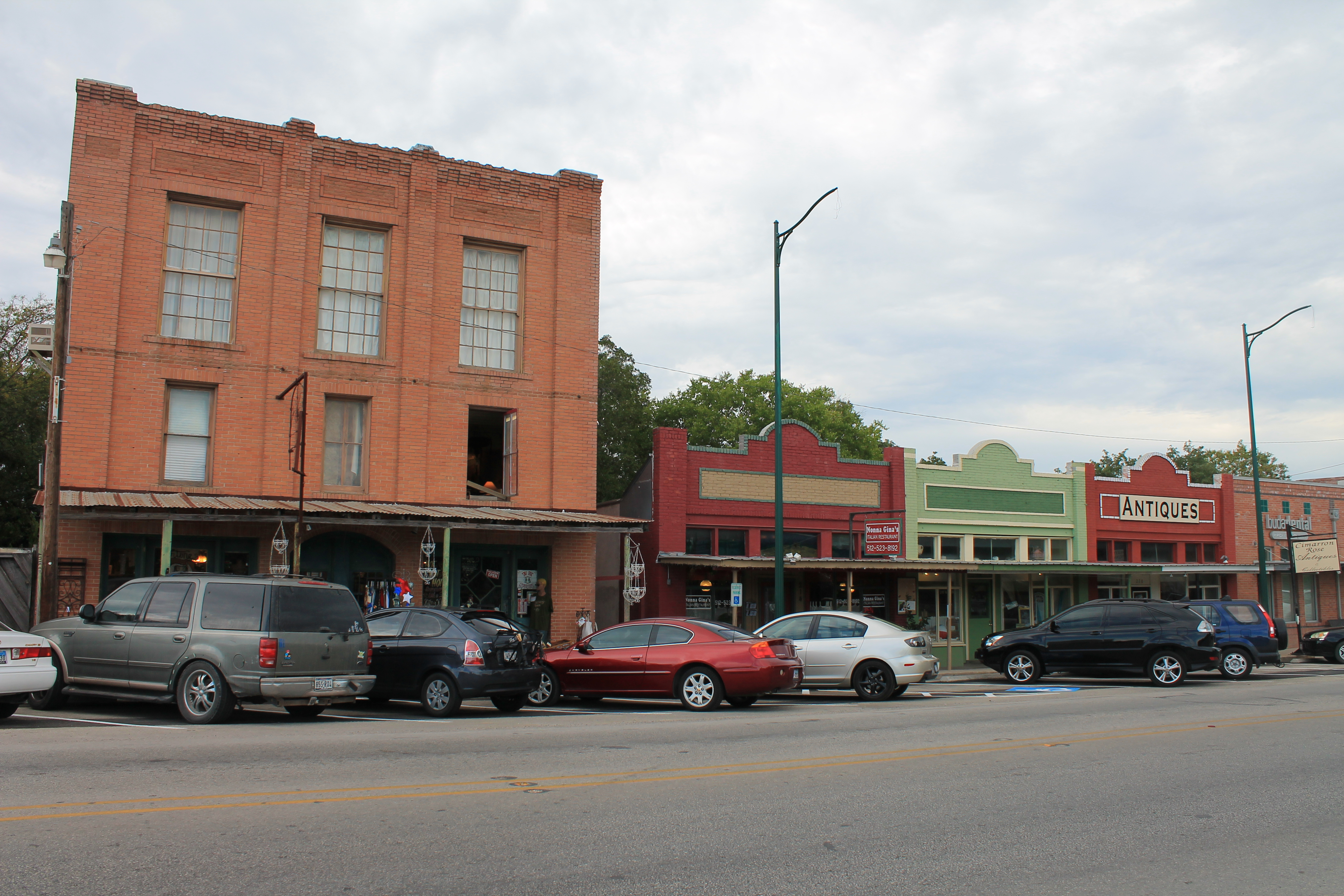

== Shaun Bonn ==
- National Register of Historic Places listings in Hays County, Texas
