= Winters–Wimberley House =

Historic house in Texas, United States

- U.S. National Register of Historic Places
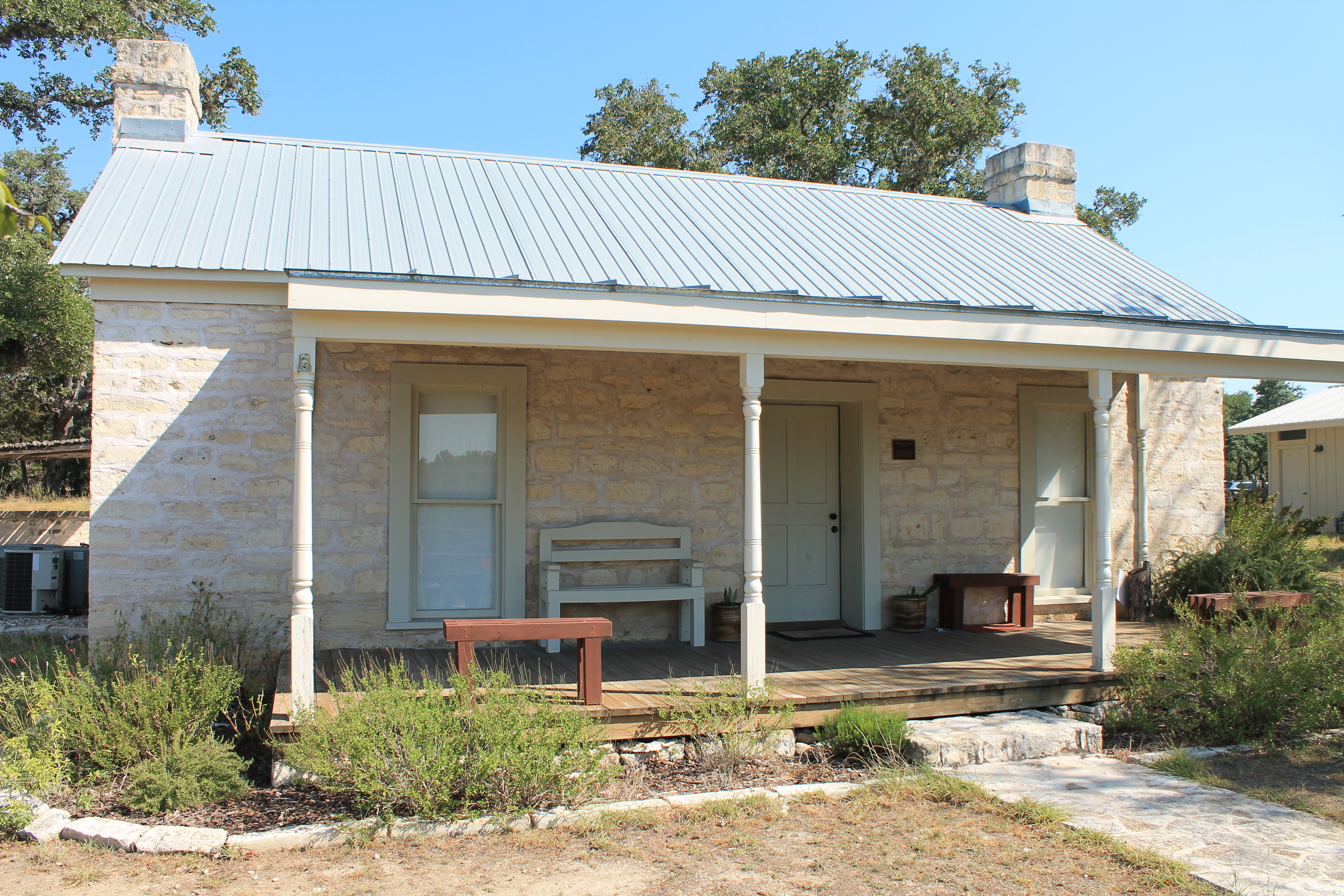
- Winters–Wimberley House in 2012

- Location within Texas Location within the United States
- Location: 14070 Ranch Road 12, Wimberley, Texas
- Coordinates: 29°59′53″N 98°5′54″W
- Area: 5.1 acres (2.1 ha)
- Built: 1856
- Built by: William C. Winters
- Architectural style: Hall-parlor plan
- MPS: Rural Properties of Hays County, Texas MPS
- NRHP reference No.: 02000527
- Added to NRHP: May 22, 2002

The Winters–Wimberley House is a historic home in Wimberley, Texas that was built c. 1856. It was listed on the National Register of Historic Places in 2002.

The property has 5 acres (2.0 ha) out of an original 34-acre (14 ha) mill site property obtained in 1856 by William C. Winters (1809–1864) near Glendale trading post (which later became Wimberley). Winters built a mill and a house, connected by a wagon path which eventually became Ranch Road 12, a busy county highway that eventually split the property.

The mill was later owned by a Wimberley.

== See also ==
- National Register of Historic Places listings in Hays County, Texas
