= Farmers Union Gin Company =

- U.S. National Register of Historic Places
- Recorded Texas Historic Landmark
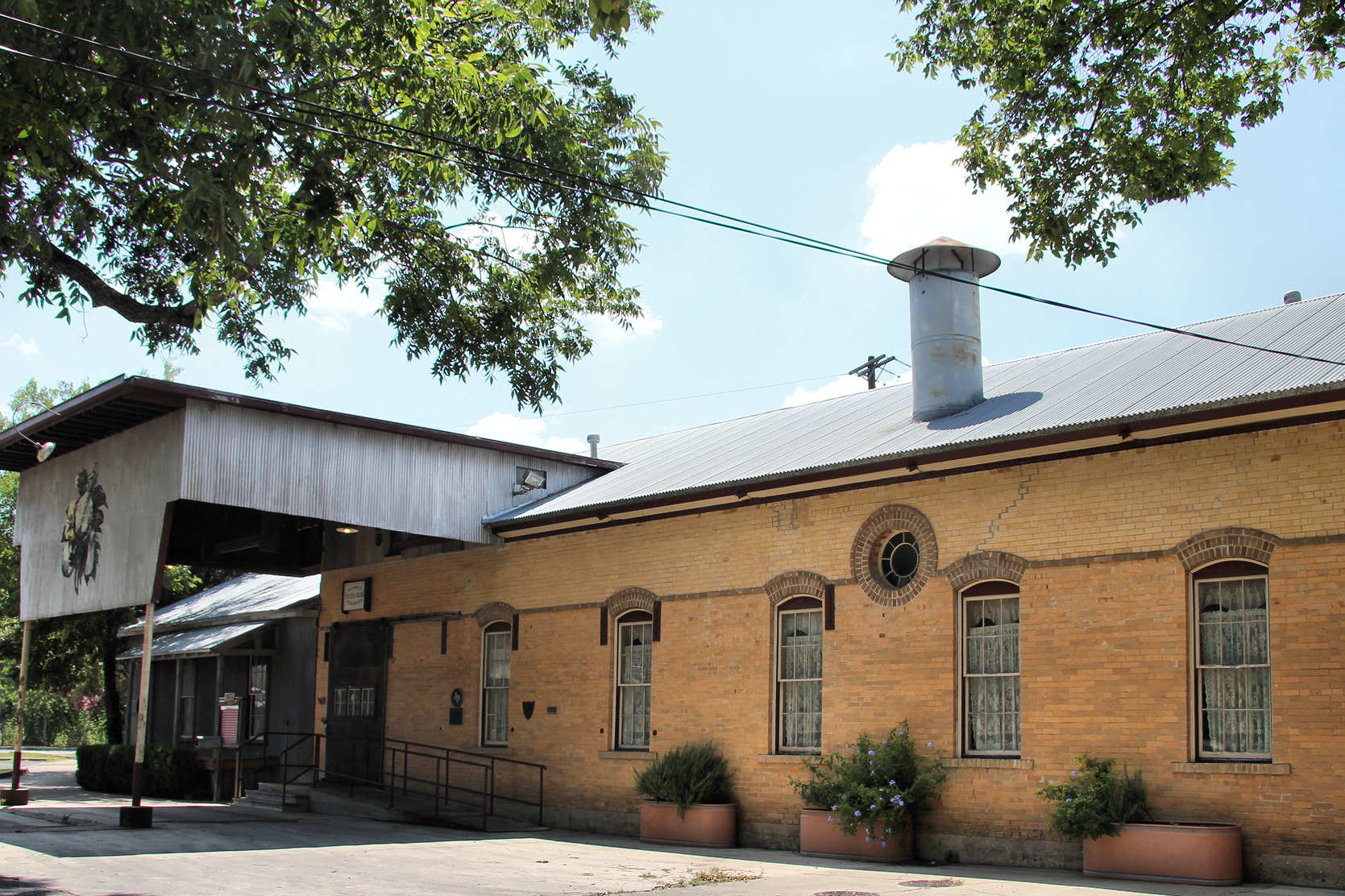
- Farmers Union Gin Company in 2012

- Location within Texas Location within the United States
- Location: 120 Grove St., San Marcos, Texas
- Coordinates: 29°52′33″N 97°56′25″W
- Area: 1 acre (0.40 ha)
- Built: 1910
- MPS: San Marcos MRA
- NRHP reference No.: 83004494
- RTHL No.: 10264

Significant dates
- Added to NRHP: August 26, 1983
- Designated RTHL: 1981

Farmers Union Gin Company was an American cotton processing company located in San Marcos, Texas. Its main facility, located at 120 Grove Street, is now a registered historic site.

== History ==
In 1908, Henry Kellerman, J. H. Barbee, A. H. Fleming, I. B. Rylander, and J. H. Williams acquired the premises of 120 Grove Street. They then established in 1909 the Farmers Union Gin Company under the leadership of Oscar Calvin Smith Sr. (b. 1876 d. 1948, Texas Cotton Ginners Association organizer and director, San Marcos city commissioner 1924–1941 and mayor 1941–1942), an organization which would proceed to operate San Marcos' largest industrial facility at the time.

The gin continued operations until 1966 and was later recognized by both the Texas Historical Commission and National Register of Historic Places.

== Structure ==
The present building was constructed in 1911 as a replacement for one that was destroyed by fire.

== See also ==
- National Register of Historic Places listings in Hays County, Texas
- Recorded Texas Historic Landmarks in Hays County
