= Kyle City Hall =

- U.S. National Register of Historic Places
- Texas State Antiquities Landmark
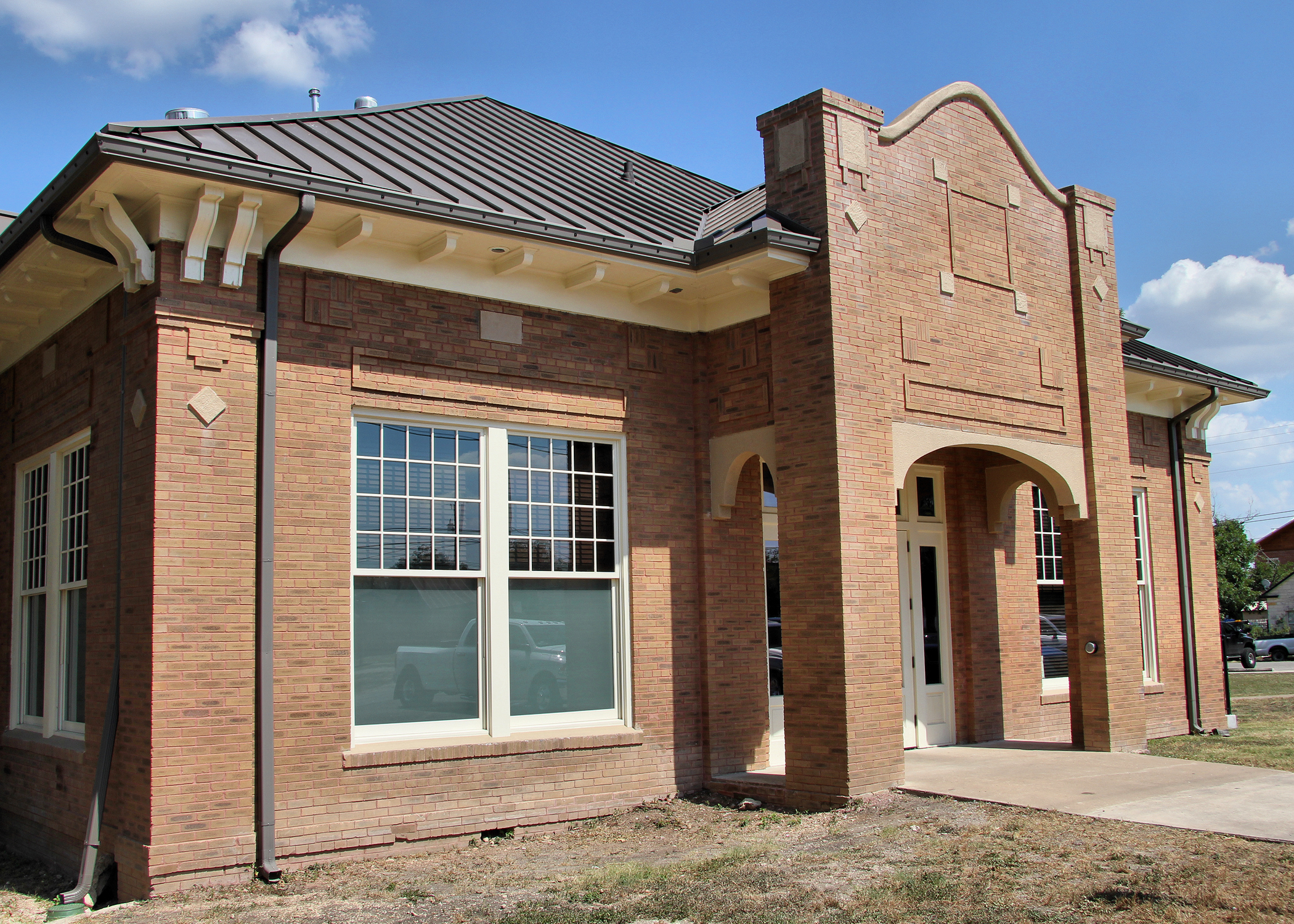
- Kyle City Hall in 2012

- Location within Texas Location within the United States
- Location: 109 Burleson Rd., Kyle, Texas
- Coordinates: 29°59′18″N 97°52′37″W
- Area: 1 acre (0.40 ha)
- Built: 1912
- Built by: Fred and Tom Millhollon
- Architect: Roy L. Thomas
- Architectural style: Mission/Spanish Revival
- MPS: Rural Properties of Hays County, Texas MPS
- NRHP reference No.: 02000528
- TSAL No.: 8200003023

Significant dates
- Added to NRHP: 22 May 2002
- Designated TSAL: 20 April 2006

Krug Activity Center, previously the Kyle City Hall is located in Kyle, Texas.

== Description and history ==
The city hall was built in 1912 on a parcel of land in a section designated for a public square in the original plan of Kyle. In addition to government and civic purposes the facility served the community other ways such as acting as the high school auditorium until 1937. When the Baptist church in town burned down the congregation was allowed to use the building for services on Sundays. A Methodist church later needed a facility and the two congregations used the building on a rotating basis.

It was added to the National Register of Historic Places on May 22, 2002. It ceased serving as the city hall in 2007 and since then has been an activity center for seniors and the community. In 2017 it was renamed in honor of a long serving local law enforcement officer and city official John P. Krug and to reflect its current usage. In addition to his career in public service Krug had lived across the street from the property for decades and he took personal interest in the old city hall.

== See also ==
- National Register of Historic Places listings in Hays County, Texas
