= First United Methodist Church (San Marcos, Texas) =

Historic church in Texas, United States

- First United Methodist Church San Marcos
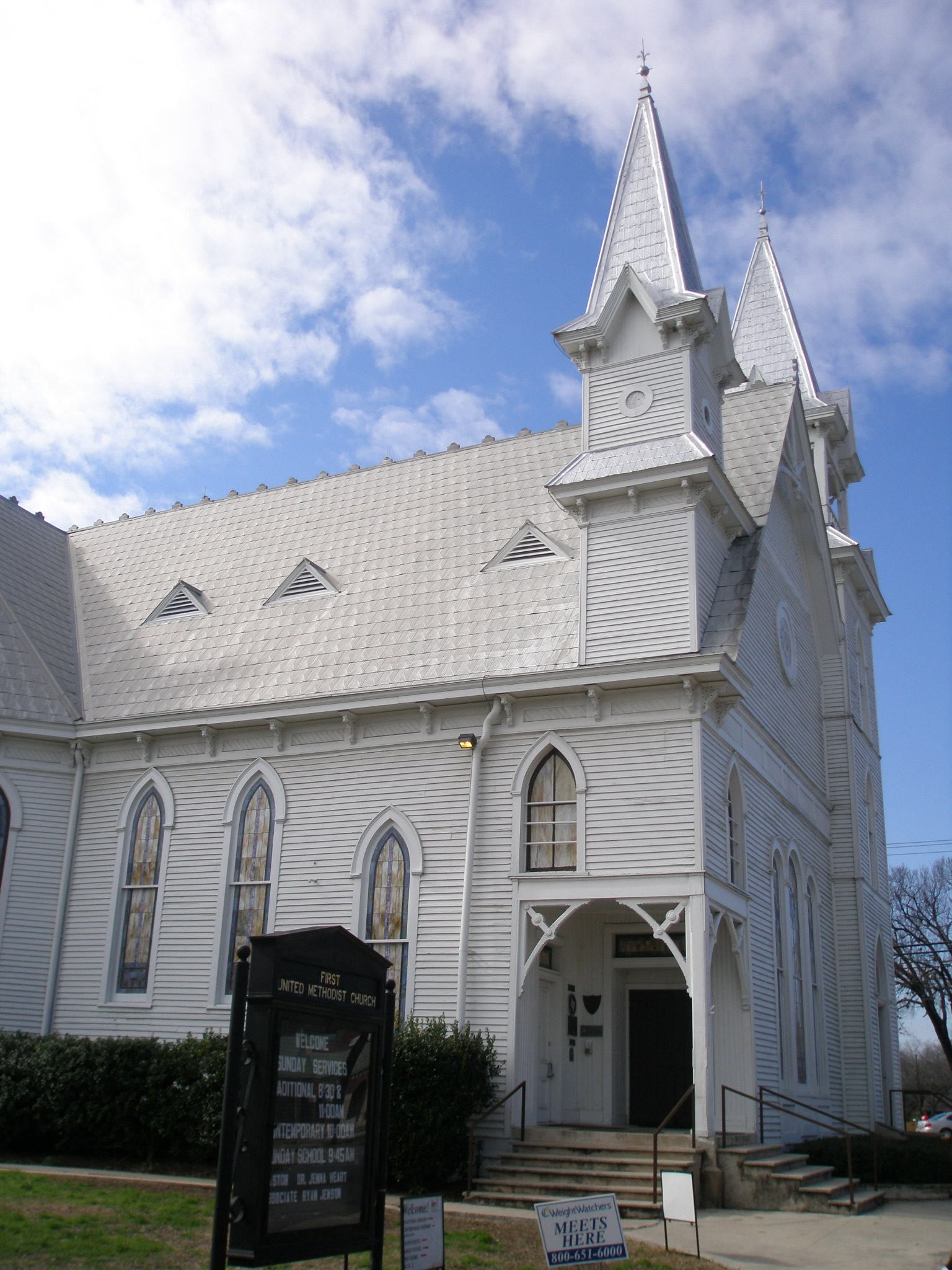
- First United Methodist Church in 2010

- Location within Texas Location within the United States
- 29°53′2″N 97°56′34″W
- Location: 129 W. Hutchison, San Marcos, Texas
- Country: United States
- Denomination: United Methodist Church
- Website: www.fumcsm.org

History
- Status: Parish church
- Founded: 1847

Architecture
- Functional status: Active
- Style: Gothic Revival, Victorian Gothic
- Years built: 1893

Administration
- Division: Rio Texas Conference

Clergy
- Pastor: Rev. Bonnie Bevers
- First United Methodist Church
- U.S. National Register of Historic Places
- Recorded Texas Historic Landmark
- Area: less than one acre
- NRHP reference No.: 74002269
- RTHL No.: 10271

Significant dates
- Added to NRHP: November 8, 1974
- Designated RTHL: 1970

First United Methodist Church is a historic church at 129 W. Hutchison in San Marcos, Texas.

An easily recognized landmark of the San Marcos skyline is the Carpenter Gothic sanctuary of First United Methodist Church. The sanctuary was built in 1893, but the congregation dates back to 1847 in the earliest days of the city of San Marcos. The present sanctuary is the third building to occupy this site. First United Methodist Church's historic 1893 sanctuary served as the architectural inspiration for the Old Main building at Texas State University.

== Founding of Church ==
A Methodist circuit-rider, A.B.F. Kerr, organized the congregation on August 5, 1847, in the log cabin home of the John D. Pitts family, which was located on the next corner from the church's present location. There were nine charter members.

After meeting at the Pitts home for two years, the congregation moved their services to a public building, used as a school, courthouse, church, and community hall. When John D. Pitts bought the property along the San Antonio Road, he deeded his property in town (including the present church site) to the church.

== Early Buildings ==
In 1855, the Methodist congregation joined with the Masonic Order to construct a two-story frame building on this site. The church used the lower floor, and the Masons used the upper floor. But only 13 years later, the building was destroyed by fire.

A second building, this time made of red brick, was completed on the site in 1872. The bell now hanging in the bell tower was given for the brick church by a relative of Benjamin Hawkins, who had been appointed Indian agent by George Washington. In 1806, during Thomas Jefferson's presidency, Hawkins established Fort Hawkins in Macon, Georgia for the conversion of the Indians. The bell hung in the chapel, and is believed to be the oldest artifact in San Marcos. In 1891, only 19 years after the brick church was built, the building developed serious cracks (probably due to an underground fault) and had to be torn down.

== Present Sanctuary ==
The present church sanctuary was completed in 1893. It is built in the shape of a cross with cypress lumber and beam and sits on large cedar posts. It still has its original curved walnut pews, pulpit, and altar rail. A group of young children under the age of seven years was organized as the “Society of Willing Workers.” This group raised money for several of the furnishings for the new church: the walnut altar rail, the walnut pulpit, and the chandelier over the pulpit. The total cost in 1893 was $75.

The interior walls are the original beaded board. The present chandeliers hang from the original cast iron medallions which feature cherubs in the central medallions. Cast iron hymnal racks with hoops to hold walking canes are on the backs of the pews; and original wire hat holders for gentlemen's hat can be found under certain pews. A balcony was added in 1911, which was larger than the present balcony. About that same time, the level floor of the church was made to slope to give people in the back of the sanctuary a better view.

In 1912, the church installed San Marcos's first pipe organ at the cost of $3,500. It was converted to electricity in 1924 and has undergone several major renovations.

In 1938–39, Art glass windows were installed which replaced panes of colored glass.

In 1974, the church building was added to the National Register.

In 1980-81 the congregation undertook an extensive renovation of the 1893 church building at the cost of $441,000. New shingles were reproduced from molds of the original shingles. The four-story bell tower, which had been closed in at some point in the church history, was reopened to provide a view of the old bell. Windows were removed and releaded, pews were refinished, and plywood paneling that had covered the front wall of the sanctuary was removed to reveal the original beaded board and stand glass transoms.

In 1983, a set of kneeling cushions which depict the history of the congregation were commissioned for the altar rail. The cushions were designed by Betty Smith (a professional needlepoint designer and wife of a former church minister) and needlepointed by the women of the congregation.

In 2012, the congregation began additional work on restoring the historic sanctuary. The entire interior of the building was sanded, worn wood was repaired, and the interior was repainted. The carpet was replaced and the hardwood floors were refinished and exposed at the front of the sanctuary. The pews were removed to allow for full inspection of the flooring, and the pews were inspected and repaired as needed. Additional lights were added to the sanctuary to highlight the choir, and the pipe organ façade was removed for restoration and repainting.

== See also ==
- National Register of Historic Places listings in Hays County, Texas
- Recorded Texas Historic Landmarks in Hays County
