= Dr. Joseph M. and Sarah Pound Farmstead =

Historic house in Texas, United States

- U.S. National Register of Historic Places
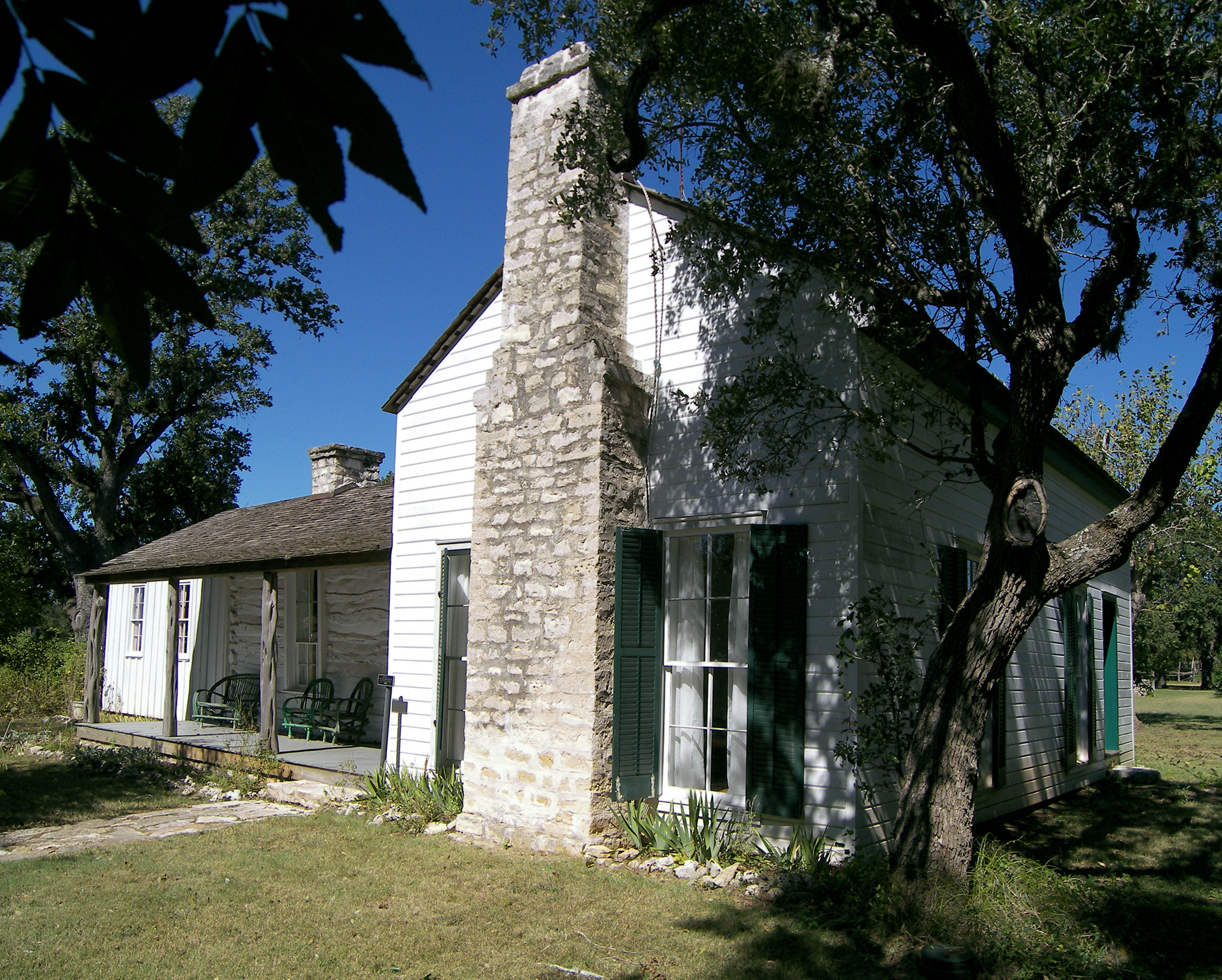
- Pound Farmstead house in 2007

- Location within Texas Location within the United States
- Interactive map showing the location of Dr. Joseph M. and Sarah Pound Farmstead
- Location: 570 Founders Park Rd., Dripping Springs, Texas
- Coordinates: 30°12′2″N 98°4′50″W
- Area: 3 acres (1.2 ha)
- Built: 1854
- Website: Official website
- NRHP reference No.: 95000929
- Added to NRHP: July 28, 1995

The Pound Farmstead, also known as the Dr. Pound Pioneer Farmstead, is a historic farm located in Hays County, Texas United States. The original 750-acre (3.0 km^{2}) farm was founded by Doctor Joseph McKegg Pound and his wife Sarah in 1854 in an unsettled area of Central Texas, now located in the City of Dripping Springs. The farmstead is currently a museum about the life and times of Dr. Pound, his family and descendants. The property was added to the National Register of Historic Places on July 28, 1995.

Pound first came to Texas 1847 to fight in the Mexican–American War. He returned to Kentucky to pursue his medical education. In 1853, he returned to Texas with his wife, Sarah, along with two other families, John Lee and Malvina Wallace and daughter, Carrie; and John Lauter and Indiana "Nannie" Moss and son, Joseph. Dr. Pound first bought acreage near Henly; however, by December 1854, he sold his holdings there and purchased the land in what would become Dripping Springs. It is believed the spot for the farm was chosen because it was on the road connecting Austin to Fort Martin Scott in Fredericksburg.

The original Pound Home, the oldest existing building in Dripping Springs, was built as a "dog-trot" style log cabin, but was expanded to make room for Dr. Pound's medical practice. Dr. Pound was the earliest doctor in Hays County. The Pound house served as a medical office and hospital, church, schoolhouse, post office and social gathering place for the fledgling community of Dripping Springs. Dr. Pound also insisted on treating the local Indians with respect, and due to this was never raided.

The Pounds had nine children. Four generations of the family occupied the farmstead over a period of 130 years, until 1983. The property was donated to the City of Dripping Springs in 1987. In 1990, restorations on the house began. The Dr. Joseph M. and Sarah Pound Historical Museum opened in May 2003 and is part of Founder's Park.

== See also ==
- National Register of Historic Places listings in Hays County, Texas
