= Fort Street Presbyterian Church (San Marcos, Texas) =

Historic church in Texas, United States

- U.S. National Register of Historic Places
- Recorded Texas Historic Landmark
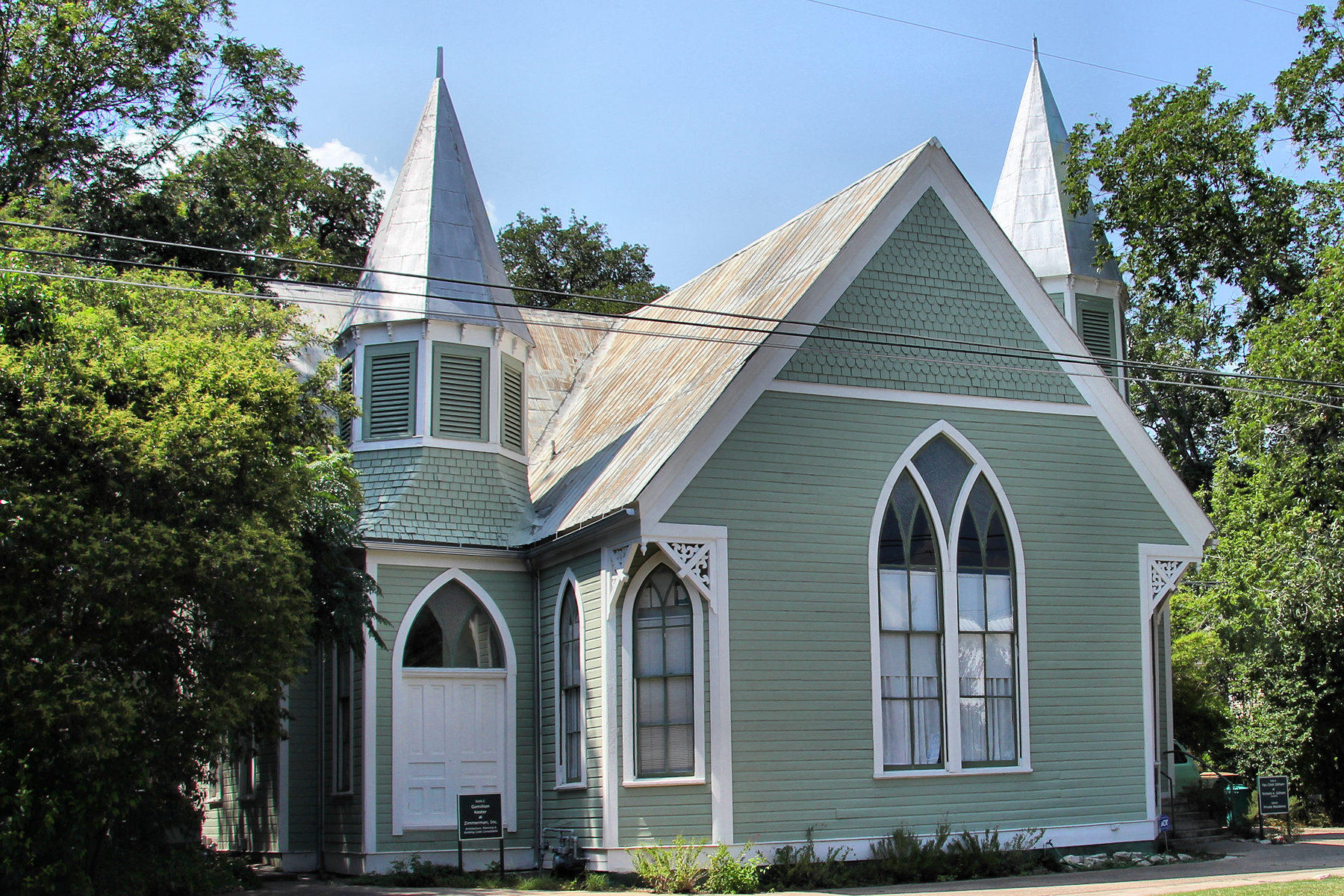
- Fort Street Presbyterian Church in 2012

- Location within Texas Location within the United States
- Location: 516 W. Hopkins St., San Marcos, Texas
- Coordinates: 29°52′54″N 97°56′47″W
- Area: less than one acre
- Built: 1901
- Built by: Samuel Blue Bales, John Cape
- Architectural style: Late Gothic Revival
- MPS: San Marcos MRA
- NRHP reference No.: 84001860
- RTHL No.: 12730

Significant dates
- Added to NRHP: March 23, 1984
- Designated RTHL: 2001

Fort Street Presbyterian Church is a historic Presbyterian church building at 516 W. Hopkins Street in San Marcos, Texas.

The late-Gothic Revival building was constructed in 1901 and added to the National Register of Historic Places in 1984.

== See also ==
- National Register of Historic Places listings in Hays County, Texas
- Recorded Texas Historic Landmarks in Hays County
