= Katherine Anne Porter House =

Historic house in Texas, United States

- U.S. National Register of Historic Places
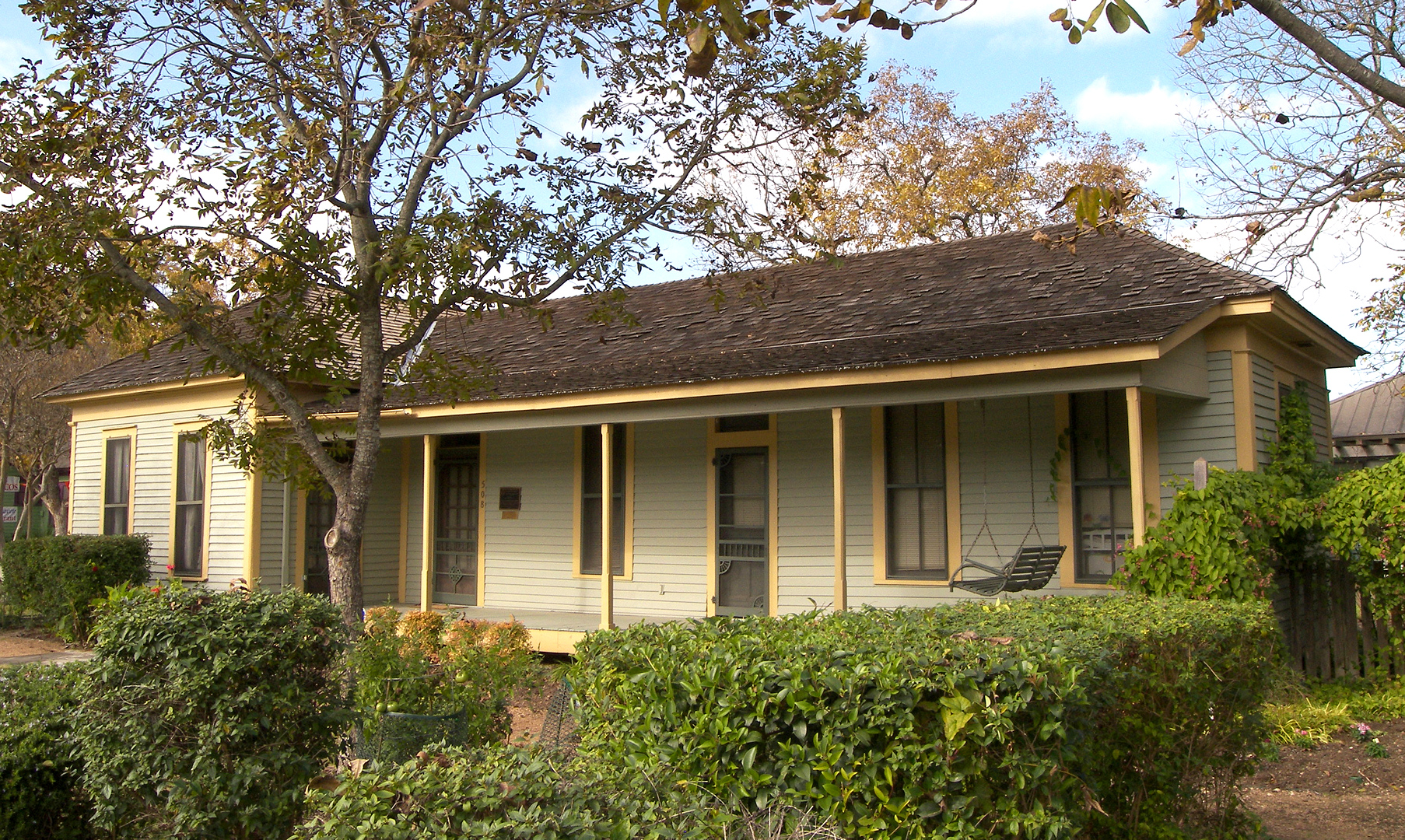
- Porter House in 2009

- Location within Texas Location within the United States
- Location: 508 W. Center St., Kyle, Texas
- Coordinates: 29°59′21″N 97°52′46″W
- Area: less than one acre
- Built: 1890
- Architectural style: L-plan
- Website: kapliterarycenter.com
- NRHP reference No.: 04000893
- Added to NRHP: August 20, 2004

The Katherine Anne Porter House is the childhood home of writer Katherine Anne Porter. Located in Kyle, Texas, it was built in 1890 by Porter's widowed grandmother. Porter's father moved his family to his mother's house after the death of his wife in 1892. The family lived in the house until 1902, being cared for by her grandmother until her death in 1901. The house passed through successive owners over the years until it fell into disrepair. In 1997, the house was purchased, restored and established as a museum dedicated to Katherine Anne Porter. The house was designated a National Literary Landmark in 2002 and was added to the National Register of Historic Places in 2006.

== History ==
Katherine Anne Porter was born in 1890 to Mary Alice (Jones) and Harrison Porter in Indian Creek, Texas. Her family, which included an older brother and sister, lived in a two-room log cabin on their small farm. In 1892, Porter's mother died two months after the birth of her third daughter. Harrison Porter sold his farm and moved his newly expanded family to the home of his widowed mother, Catherine Anne Porter, in Kyle, Texas. Porter and her family lived with her grandmother, "Aunt Cat", in her small, cramped house for the next ten years. Aunt Cat died in 1901 and the family stayed in her house until it was sold in 1902.

== Description ==
The historic home is a single-story, L-shaped house, located at 508 West Center Street in Kyle, Hays County, Texas. The wood-frame house, built in 1890, originally consisted of a combined living and dining room, two bedrooms, a small storage room and a sleeping porch. The house exterior included a projecting front wing and an attached shed roof porch. In contrast to other L-plan houses in Kyle, the Porter roof was a rare cross-hipped roof style. The rear and east side of the house has a wrap-around screened porch.

The Porter family sold the house for $10 in 1902. Successive owners enlarged the house and it eventually fell into disrepair. The house was purchased in 1997, with the goal of restoring the house to its original condition and to establish the Katherine Anne Porter museum. Restoration of the house was completed in April, 2000.

The Katherine Anne Porter house was dedicated by First Lady Laura Bush, on June 13, 2002 as a National Literary Landmark. It is owned by the Hays County Preservation Associates and leased to Southwest Texas State University. The Katherine Anne Porter museum sponsors a writers-in-residence program associated with the University's creative writing program. The house was added to the National Register of Historic Places in 2006.

The home is open for a guided tour by appointment only.

== See also ==
- National Register of Historic Places listings in Hays County, Texas
- List of residences of American writers
