= Old Main (Texas State University) =

Historic place in Texas, United States

- Main Building, Southwest Texas Normal School
- U.S. National Register of Historic Places
- Texas State Antiquities Landmark
- Recorded Texas Historic Landmark
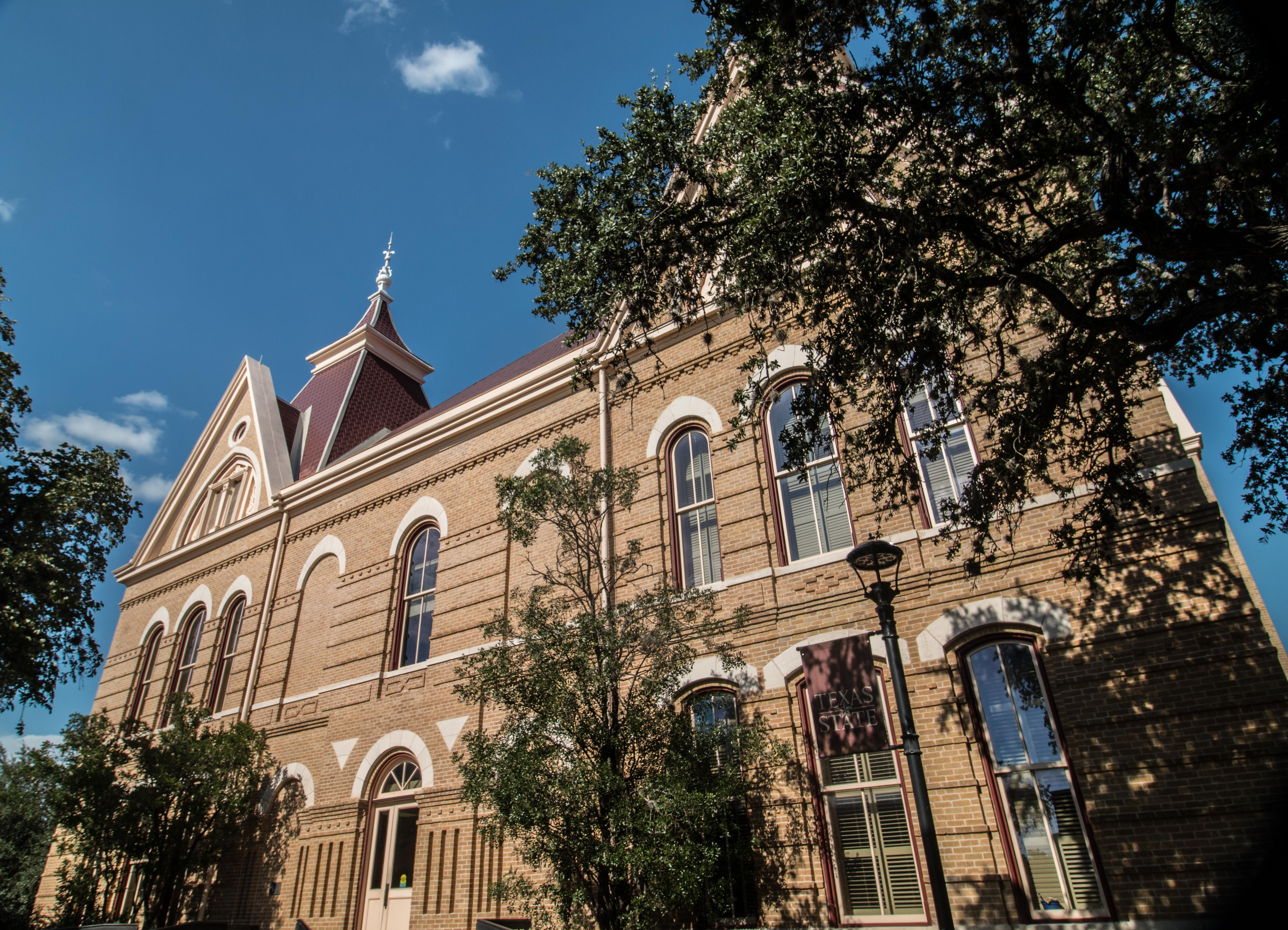
- Old Main in 2003

- Location within Texas Location within the United States
- Location: Old Main St., Texas State University campus, San Marcos, Texas
- Coordinates: 29°53′21″N 97°56′19″W
- Area: less than one acre
- Built: 1902
- Built by: Francis Fisher & R.C. Lambie
- Architect: Edward Northcraft
- Architectural style: Gothic
- MPS: San Marcos MRA
- NRHP reference No.: 83004505
- TSAL No.: 8200000348
- RTHL No.: 10307

Significant dates
- Added to NRHP: August 26, 1983
- Designated TSAL: September 3, 1982
- Designated RTHL: 1963

Old Main is a red-roofed Victorian Gothic building on the campus of Texas State University. Situated at one end of the quad, it was Texas State's first building, built in 1903, and remained the only building on campus until 1908. Old Main was added to the National Register of Historic Places (NRHP) in 1983. It currently houses the offices for the School of Journalism and Mass Communication as well as the College of Fine Arts.

== Design and construction ==
Edward Northcraft designed the building for Southwest Texas State Normal College (now Texas State University) in 1902. The building was dubbed "Main" as it was the only building on the campus when it was opened for classes in the Fall of 1903. The original design included an auditorium and chapel on the second floor with an ornate cathedral ceiling, stage and balcony. When construction began, multiple loads of concrete were poured for the foundation which disappeared into the ground. A cave under the site of the building was discovered and had to be plugged before the foundation could really be set.

Contractors for the Old Main Building were Francis Fischer & R.C. Lambie of Austin, Texas.

Once other buildings began opening on campus to hold classes, the building was used as the university's administration building.

== 1972 - Present ==
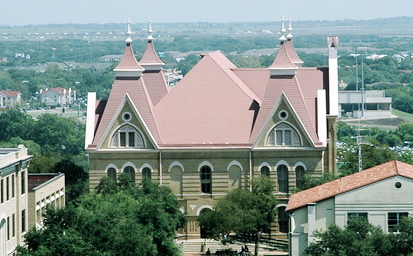
A view of Old Main, shot from the 7th floor of the Albert B. Alkek Library at Texas State University

In 1972, the interior of the building was renovated and the chapel ceiling was restored. Following completion of this work the building was rededicated and officially became "Old Main." During this renovation, the auditorium on the second floor was partitioned into smaller rooms.

In 1988, a renovation added a floor at the balcony level. This renovation maintained the ornate ceiling which was visible on the new third floor. The most recent renovations in 1993 and 1994 restored the original color and style of the building's roof.

Today, Old Main at Texas State holds the College of Fine Arts and Communication along with the School of Journalism and Mass Communication.

A $3.5 million restoration and repair on Old Main's roof was completed in January 2014 with most of the work being done in 2013. Scaffolding was removed on January 17, 2014. The project included replacement of the roof and minor structural repairs to roof substrate and damaged/deteriorated wood framing members.

== See also ==
- National Register of Historic Places listings in Hays County, Texas
- Recorded Texas Historic Landmarks in Hays County
- List of Old Main buildings
