= Fire Station and City Hall =

- U.S. National Register of Historic Places
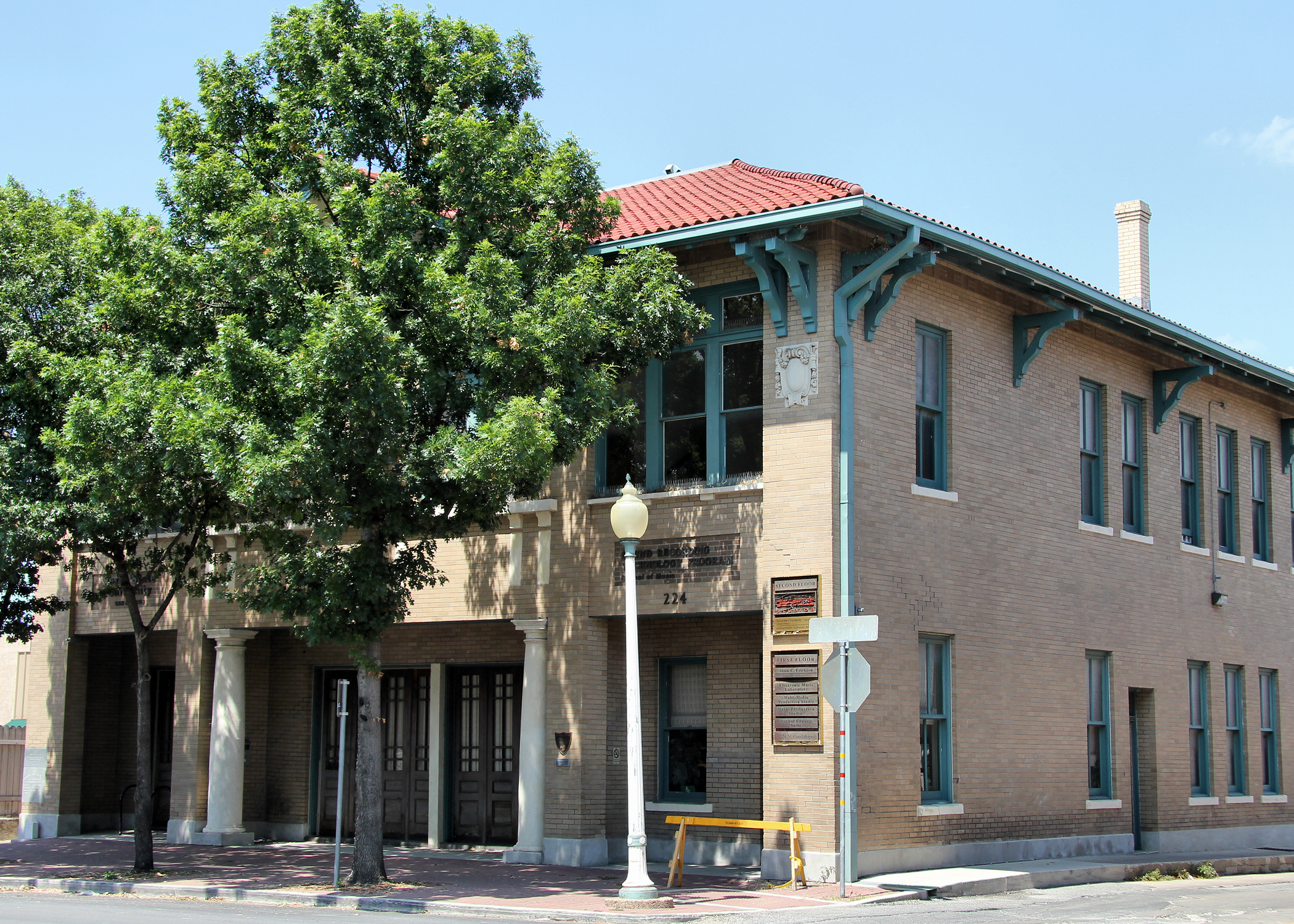

- Location within Texas
- Location: 224 N. Guadalupe St., San Marcos, Texas
- Coordinates: 29°53′02″N 97°56′28″W
- Area: less than one acre
- Built: 1915
- Architect: Roy L. Thomas
- Architectural style: Late 19th And 20th Century Revivals
- MPS: San Marcos MRA
- NRHP reference No.: 83004495
- Added to NRHP: August 26, 1983

The Fire Station and City Hall at 224 N. Guadalupe St. in San Marcos, Texas was built in 1915. It was listed on the National Register of Historic Places in 1983.

It is a two-story buff brick building. It was designed by Austin architect Roy L. Thomas.
