= Texas State Highway 237 =

State highway in Texas

State Highway 237
- SH 237, highlighted in red

Route information
- Maintained by TxDOT
- Length: 16.08 mi (25.88 km)
- Existed: 1936–present

Major junctions
- South end: SH 159 near Oldenburg
- North end: US 290 near Carmine

Location
- Country: United States
- State: Texas
- Counties: Fayette, Washington

Highway system
- Highways in Texas; Interstate; US; State; Former; Toll; Loops; Spurs; FM/RM; Park; Rec
← SH 236	→ SH 238

State Highway 237 (SH 237) is a state highway in the U.S. state of Texas that runs from near La Grange northeast to US 290 near Carmine.

== Route description ==
SH 237 begins at SH 159 near Oldenburg, northeast of La Grange. It takes a northeasterly path through rural Fayette County, intersecting FM 1291 and FM 954, before entering the town of Round Top, where it intersects FM 1457. Near the Washington County line, Spur 458, a former routing of US 290, provides a connection to Carmine. After entering Washington County, SH 237 ends at US 290, with northbound SH 237 traffic merging onto eastbound US 290 toward Brenham.

== History ==
SH 237 was designated on December 22, 1936 as a renumbering of SH 128 (which replaced this section of SH 72 on November 24, 1936) to avoid confusion with the recently cancelled SH 128. On September 26, 1939, the section southwest of SH 159 was transferred to SH 159.

== Junction list ==
County	Location	mi	km	Destinations	Notes
Fayette		0.0	0.0	SH 159 – La Grange, Fayetteville	
Fayette		3.6	5.8	FM 1291 – Ledbetter, Fayetteville	
Fayette		4.9	7.9	FM 954 – Willow Springs	
Fayette	Round Top	8.4	13.5	FM 1457 – Winedale	
Fayette		13.3	21.4	Spur 458 – Carmine	
Washington		16.1	25.9	US 290 – Giddings, Brenham	
1.000 mi = 1.609 km; 1.000 km = 0.621 mi
