= Round Top-Carmine High School =

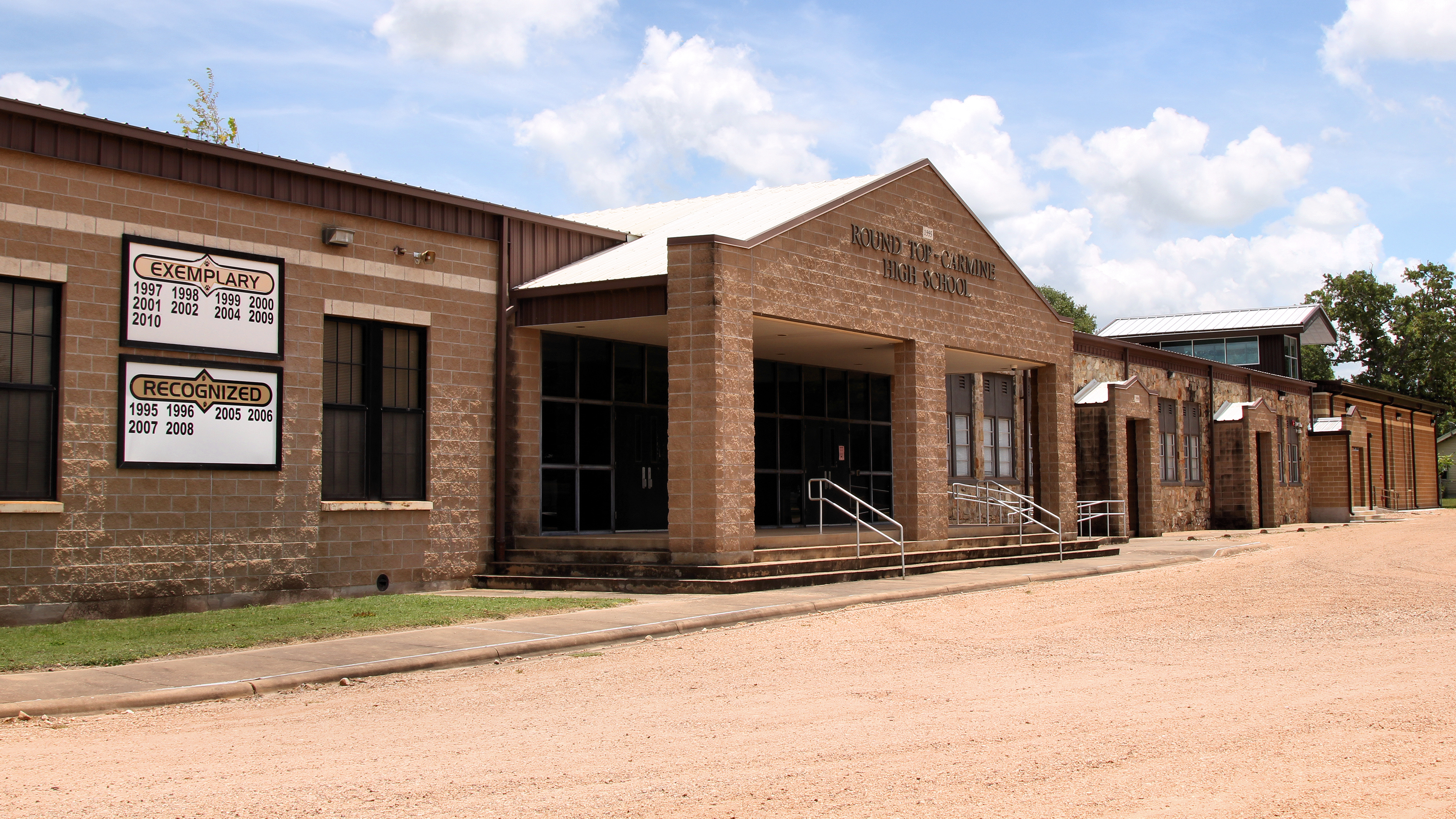

Location
- 378 Centennial Street; Carmine, Texas 78932; United States; 30.144017°N 96.681436°W

Information
- School type: Public high school
- School district: Round Top-Carmine Independent School District
- Principal: RaChelle Kuecker
- Teaching staff: 13.19 (FTE)
- Grades: 7-12
- Enrollment: 112 (2023–2024)
- Student to teacher ratio: 8.49
- Colors: Black and gold
- Athletics conference: UIL Class A
- Mascot: Cub/Cubette
- Website: Round Top-Carmine High School

Round Top-Carmine is a 1A public high school located in Carmine, Texas (USA). It is part of the Round Top-Carmine Independent School District located in northeast Fayette County. In 2013, the school was rated "Met Standard" by the Texas Education Agency.

== Athletics ==
The Round Top-Carmine Cubs and Cubettes compete in volleyball, cross country, basketball, cheer, tennis, track, golf, and baseball.

=== State titles ===
- Girls basketball
  - 1966(B), 1971(B), 1972(B)
- Volleyball
  - 1995(1A), 1996(1A), 2003(1A), 2010(1A), 2013(1A), 2015 (1A)

==== State finalist ====
- Girls basketball
  - 1965(B)
- Volleyball
  - 1989(1A), 1990(1A), 1994(1A), 1997(1A), 1999(1A), 2000(1A), 2001(1A), 2012(1A), 2019(1A), 2026(1A)
- Boys cross country

2016 (1A) Joseph McConnell
