= Black Jack Springs, Texas =

Ghost town in Texas, US

Coordinates: 29°49′22″N 96°58′51″W

Black Jack Springs is a ghost town in southwestern Fayette County, Texas, United States.

During the early 1850s the earlier Anglo settlers were joined by German immigrants, including the Luck, Loessin, Melcher, Mueller and Oeding Families as well as noted German poet Johannes Christlieb Nathanael Romberg. The Black Jack Springs post office was closed in 1910, and by 1949 the school had also been closed. In 1967, the last remaining church, Trinity Lutheran, merged with the nearby Salem Lutheran Church of Freyburg, Texas, and The Philadelphia Evangelical Lutheran Church of Swiss Alp, Texas, to form the United Evangelical Lutheran Church of Swiss Alp. Today, all that remains is the Black Jack Springs cemetery to mark the site of the community.
