= Round Top Antiques Fair =

Antiques show in Texas, United States

The Round Top Antiques Fair (also known as Round Top Antiques Show) is a large antiques show held three times annually in Round Top, Texas and nearby towns of Burton, Carmine, Fayetteville, and Warrenton. Started in 1968, it features country, Americana, European country, and formal furniture accessories.

The fair is the largest antiques fair in Texas, and one of the largest in the United States. It features 40+ shows, thousands of vendors, and spans 11–20 miles (18–32 km) along Texas State Highway 237.

== History ==
=== The first fair ===
The first fair was organized in 1968 by antiques dealer Emma Lee Turney, at the request of Hazel Ledbetter. The fair was advertised as an Oktoberfest celebration. It took place at Round Top's Schützen Verein, a shooting club and community center, known today as Round Top Rifle Association Hall. The fair lasted two days, and had 22 (possibly 26) antique vendors brought in by Turney. The first fair was a success and became an annual fair, and biannual soon after. When the fair outgrew the Schützen Verein, it moved to the Big Red Barn event center off of Texas State Highway 237.

=== Evolution ===
As the fair became more popular, a growing number antique dealers wanted to participate; but the size of the event center, as well as the strict and juried entrance criteria, limited who could participate. In response, dealers rented nearby hayfields from farmers, and set up their own tents. By the 1990s, these hayfield vendors made up an entirely second show.

=== The fair today ===
Today, the fair is held for two weeks in October, one week in January, and two weeks in March. It spans 11–20 miles (18–32 km) along Highway 237, with more than 40 different venues (including the Big Red Barn). In March and October, the fair has more than 4,000 vendors and upwards of 100,000 visitors. Attendees have included interior designers and other celebrities including Kelly Wearstler, Martyn Lawrence Bullard, and Chip and Joanna Gaines.

== Organization ==
The Round Top Antiques fair has no central organizer or management. Each of the 40+ shows operate independently, although they run at roughly the same time along the highway. Each venue sets its own specific dates and times, although their dates mostly overlap during the standard January, March, and October weeks.

== Impact ==
The fair brings upwards of 100,000 people to the town of Round Top, which has a population of about 90. Impact on the local economy includes lodging, restaurants, and gas stations, as well as the local real estate market.
