= Texas State Highway 128 =

State highway in Texas

State Highway 128
- SH 128, highlighted in red

Route information
- Maintained by TxDOT
- Length: 13.769 mi (22.159 km)
- Existed: 1955–present

Major junctions
- West end: NM 128 at New Mexico state line near Jal
- East end: SH 115

Location
- Country: United States
- State: Texas
- Counties: Andrews

Highway system
- Highways in Texas; Interstate; US; State; Former; Toll; Loops; Spurs; FM/RM; Park; Rec
← SH 127	→ SH 129

State Highway 128 (SH 128) is a state highway in Andrews County, Texas.

== Route description ==
SH 128 begins at the New Mexico state line east of Jal, New Mexico, as New Mexico Highway 128 crosses into Texas. The route immediately encounters its only intersection between its termini, at FM 1218, which runs just inside the state line. The route travels eastward through unincorporated Andrews County before ending at SH 115 about 20 miles (32 km) southwest of Andrews.

== History ==
SH 128 was originally designated on May 21, 1927 along a route from Sinton northeast to the Victoria County line. On October 11, 1927, it was extended south to Robstown and numbered SH 128. On March 19, 1928, it was extended north to Victoria. On June 24, 1931, it had been extended west to Alice, replacing a portion of SH 12A. On September 19, 1933, it was extended north to Hallettsville. On July 15, 1935, the section from Victoria to Hallettsville was cancelled (as it was not built yet). On September 26, 1935, the section from Victoria to Hallettsville was restored as part of the lateral road program, and construction started on that section. On November 24, 1936, the entire route became part of SH 44. SH 128 was then designated on the current SH 237 from La Grange northeast to US 290 near Carmine, replacing a portion of SH 72. This was renumbered as SH 237 on December 22, 1936, presumably to avoid confusion with the just cancelled SH 128.

The current route was originally designated on May 7, 1948 as Farm to Market Road 781 and ran from the state line to FM 703. The highway was signed, but not officially designated, concurrently as SH 128 beginning on March 30, 1955, "for guidance of traveling public" to correspond with New Mexico State Highway 128 (which was renumbered from NM 256 to NM 128 that day; FM 703 was signed but not designated as part of SH 115 in October 1952). The FM 781 designation was cancelled on August 29, 1990; the same day, FM 703 became part of SH 115.

== Major intersections ==
The entire route is in Andrews County.

Location	mi	km	Destinations	Notes
	0.0	0.0	NM 128 – Jal	Western terminus and continuation
	0.0	0.0	FM 1218	
	13.8	22.2	SH 115 – Kermit, Andrews	Eastern terminus
1.000 mi = 1.609 km; 1.000 km = 0.621 mi
