= Roznov =

Roznov may refer to:

- Rožnov pod Radhoštěm, Czech Republic
- Roznov, Neamț, Romania
- Roznov, Texas
