= Texas State Highway 159 =

State highway in Texas

State Highway 159
- SH 159 highlighted in red

Route information
- Maintained by TxDOT
- Length: 57.73 mi (92.91 km)
- Existed: 1930–present

Major junctions
- West end: Bus. SH 71 at La Grange
- SH 71 near La Grange; SH 237 near Oldenburg; SH 36 in Bellville
- East end: Bus. US 290 at Hempstead

Location
- Country: United States
- State: Texas

Highway system
- Highways in Texas; Interstate; US; State; Former; Toll; Loops; Spurs; FM/RM; Park; Rec
| ← SH 158 | → SH 160 |

State Highway 159 (SH 159) is a Texas state highway that runs from La Grange to Fayetteville in Fayette County, through Industry and Bellville in Austin County, and ends at Hempstead in Waller County. The route was designated on March 19, 1930 from SH 73 east to Hempstead as a renumbering of SH 73A. On December 8, 1932, it was extended west to northeast of La Grange, replacing part of SH 73, which had been rerouted further south earlier. On September 26, 1939, SH 159 was extended to La Grange, replacing part of SH 237.

== Route description ==
SH 159 begins at Bus. SH 71 in downtown La Grange and heads northeast. The highway intersects with SH 71 on the outskirts of La Grange.

== Junction list ==
| County | Location | mi | km | Destinations | Notes |
|---|---|---|---|---|---|
| Fayette | La Grange | 0.0 | 0.0 | Bus. SH 71 | Western terminus of SH 159 |
| Fayette | La Grange | 0.5 | 0.80 | SH 71 | |
| Fayette | Oldenburg | 6.4 | 10.3 | FM 2981 | |
| Fayette | Oldenburg | 6.5 | 10.5 | SH 237 | |
| Fayette | Fayetteville | 14.4 | 23.2 | FM 955 | |
| Fayette | Fayetteville | 14.7 | 23.7 | FM 1291 | Start of FM 1291 concurrency |
| Fayette | Fayetteville | 14.8 | 23.8 | FM 1291 | End of FM 1291 concurrency |
| Fayette | Willow Springs-Zapp | 21.2 | 34.1 | FM 954 | |
| Austin | | 24.9 | 40.1 | FM 1457 | |
| Austin | Industry | 27.5 | 44.3 | FM 109 | |
| Austin | | 31.8 | 51.2 | FM 2754 | |
| Austin | Nelsonville | 33.4 | 53.8 | FM 2502 | |
| Austin | Bellville | 42.1 | 67.8 | SH 36 | Start of SH 36 concurrency |
| Austin | Bellville | 42.9 | 69.0 | FM 1456 | South end of FM 1456 |
| Austin | Bellville | 43.2 | 69.5 | SH 36 | End of SH 36 concurrency |
| Austin | Bellville | 43.3 | 69.7 | FM 529 | |
| Austin | | 51.8 | 83.4 | FM 1456 | North end of FM 1456 |
| Waller | | 54.9 | 88.4 | FM 3346 | |
| Waller | Hempstead | 58.7 | 94.5 | Bus. US 290 | Eastern terminus of SH 159 |
1.000 mi = 1.609 km; 1.000 km = 0.621 mi
