= Mullins Prairie, Texas =

Unincorporated community in Texas, US

Coordinates: 29°51′03″N 96°48′40″W

Mullins Prairie is an unincorporated community in eastern Fayette County, Texas, United States.
