= O'Quinn, Texas =

Unincorporated community in Texas, US

Coordinates: 29°49′19″N 96°58′23″W

O'Quinn is an unincorporated community in central Fayette County, Texas, United States.

O'Quinn is the birthplace of Rear Admiral John Weldon Koenig.
