= Giddings Independent School District =

School district in Texas

Address
- 2337 North Main Giddings, Texas, 78942; United States

District information
- Grades: PK–12
- Schools: 4
- NCES District ID: 4820640

Students and staff
- Students: 1,893 (2023–2024)
- Teachers: 144.89 (on an FTE basis)
- Student–teacher ratio: 13.07:1

Other information
- Website: www.giddings.txed.net

Giddings Independent School District is a public school district based in Giddings, Texas (USA).

In addition to Giddings, the district also serves rural areas in southern Lee County as well as very small portions of neighboring Fayette and Washington counties.

In 2009, the school district was rated "academically acceptable" by the Texas Education Agency.

== Schools ==
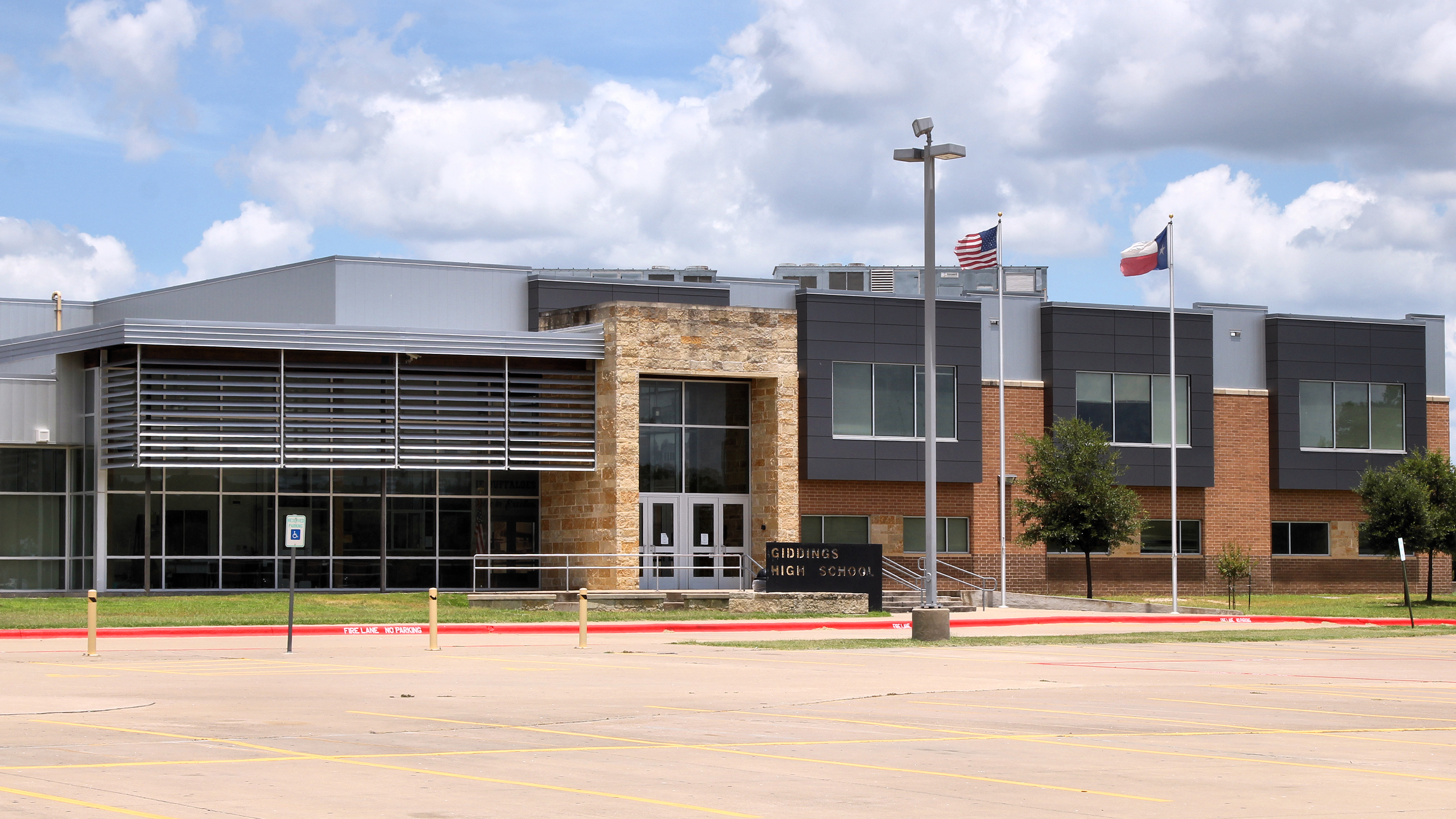
Giddings High School

- Giddings High School (Grades 9-12)
- Giddings Middle (Grades 7-8)
- Giddings Intermediate (Grades 4-6)
- Giddings Elementary (Grades PK-3)
