= Rabbs Prairie, Texas =

Unincorporated community in Texas, US

Coordinates: 29°57′49″N 96°53′26″W

Rabbs Prairie is an unincorporated community in Fayette County, Texas, United States.
