= Waldeck, Texas =

Unincorporated community in Texas, US

Coordinates: 30°03′49″N 96°47′34″W

Waldeck is an unincorporated community in northern Fayette County, Texas, United States. Originally known as Long Prairie, the town has a predominantly German heritage and was named after Count Ludwig Joseph von Boos-Waldeck. He purchased land in the area in 1843 on behalf of the Adelsverein.
