= Warrenton, Texas =

Unincorporated community in Texas, US

Coordinates: 30°01′03″N 96°43′55″W

Warrenton is an unincorporated community in northeastern Fayette County, Texas, United States. Located on State Highway 237 between Spencer Pool and Coon Creek, twelve miles northeast of La Grange. Founded by William Neese, who landed in Galveston in 1847 and named the new settlement that grew around his store for Warren Ligon, another early colonist. This area was settled by many German colonists who, with an admixture of Anglos, formed several small farming communities based on the production of cotton, corn, and dairy products. The community flourished in the late 1800s. A post office was established in 1873, when the town had a population of over 100, churches, schools, a gin, and supporting businesses. Poor soil conditions led to a shift to cattle and poultry after 1900. By 1950, the number of businesses in Warrenton had declined to seven, and the population held at 180. By 1985, the population was down to fifty, but twelve antique stores had opened and St. Martin's Church, at twelve by sixteen feet proclaimed the world's smallest Catholic church, attract visitors. The population reached sixty-five in 2000.

Warrenton hosts Trade Days on the second weekend of the month. It is also part of the Round Top Antiques Fair in the spring and fall. This is a very large antique show in several rural communities near Round Top and Warrington between Austin and Houston. The show is generally held the at end of September and beginning of October, then again in late March and early of April. Held across several weekends, it brings in approximately 100,000 visitors from across the nation and about 600 vendors.

The Sterling McCall Old Car Museum was one of the local attractions. On display in this museum were over 130 vehicles from the prized collection of Mr. Sterling B. McCall Jr., ranging in vintage from 1908 to 1967. The collection was begun in 1979. The museum facility was completed in 1998, enlarged in 1999, and again in 2003. In March 2013, the buildings were re-purposed as an antique showcase & event center. Today, the buildings house 'The Lone Star Glamp Inn', an indoor "trailer park" experience furnished with remodeled vintage trailers and themed teepees.

== Notable people ==
- Joel Walter Robison, fighter in the Texas Revolution and later member of the Texas House of Representatives; resided in Warrenton.
