= Fayette Regional Air Center =

Airport in Texas, United States of America

Coordinates: 29°54′29″N 096°57′00″W

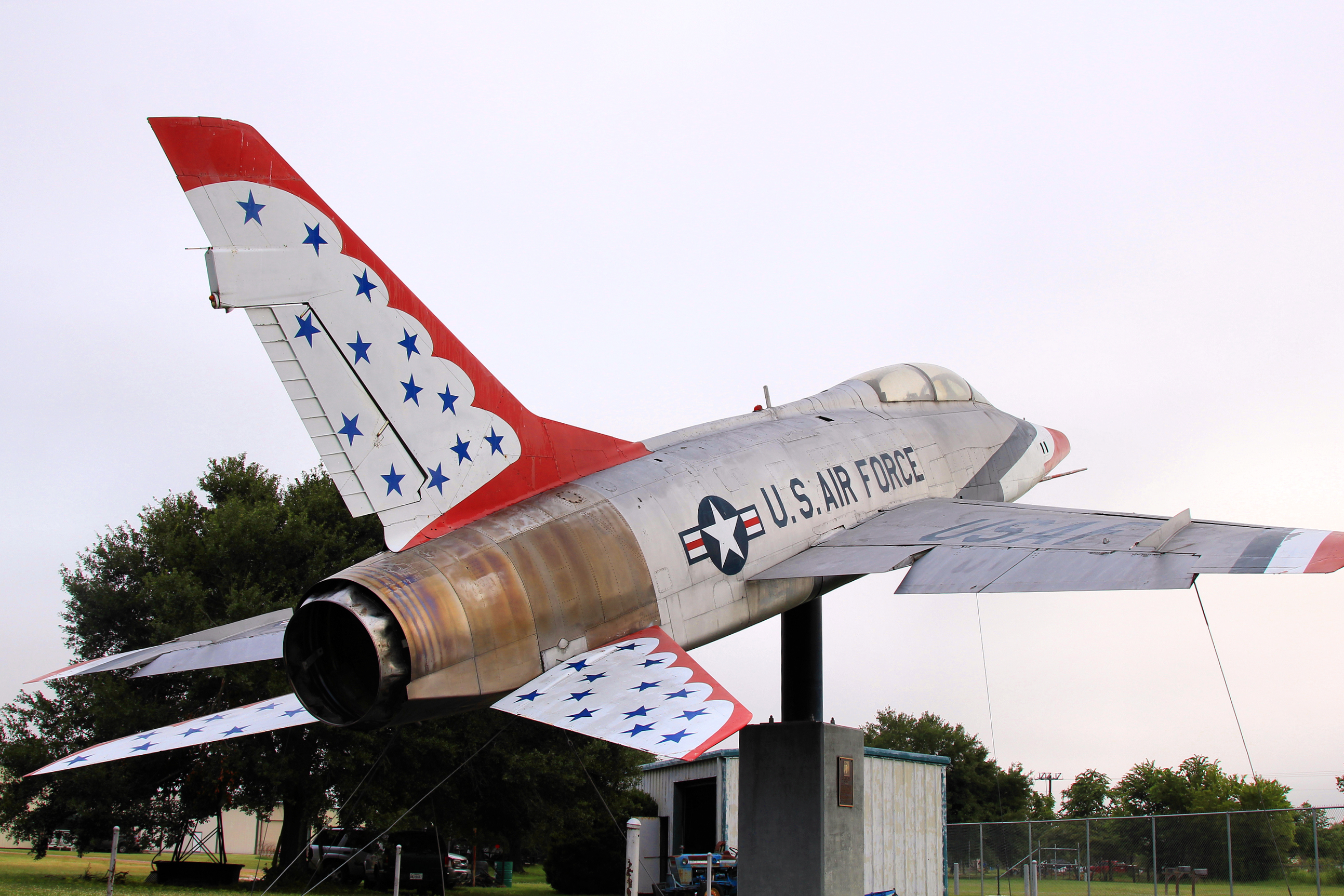
- An F-100F Super Sabre on display at the airport.
- IATA: none; ICAO: none; FAA LID: 3T5

Summary
- Airport type: Public
- Owner: Fayette County
- Location: La Grange, Texas
- Elevation AMSL: 324 ft (99 m)
- Website: www.co.fayette.tx.us/default.aspx?Fayette_County/AirCenter

Map
- Location within Texas

Runways
Direction	Length		Surface
Direction	ft	m	Surface
16/34	5,001	1,524	Asphalt

Statistics (2007)
- Aircraft operations: 9,000
- Based aircraft: 30
- Sources: airport web site and FAA

Fayette Regional Air Center (FAA LID: 3T5) is a county-owned public-use airport in unincorporated Fayette County, Texas, United States, located two miles (3 kilometers) west of the central business district of the City of La Grange.

== Facilities and aircraft ==
Fayette Regional Air Center covers an area of 195 acres (79 ha) which contains one runway designated 16/34 with a 5,001 x 75 ft (1,524 x 23 m) asphalt surface. For the 12-month period ending June 5, 2007, the airport had 9,000 general aviation aircraft operations, an average of 24 per day. There are 30 aircraft based at this airport: 83% single-engine, 13% multi-engine and 3% jet.

== See also ==
- List of airports in Texas
