= Holman, Texas =

Unincorporated community in Texas, US

Coordinates: 29°47′47″N 96°47′47″W

Holman is an unincorporated community in southeastern Fayette County, Texas, United States. Holman has a population of approximately 100 people. It lies 15 miles southeast of La Grange.
