= Hostyn, Texas =

Unincorporated community in Texas, U.S.

Coordinates: 29°50′45″N 96°55′11″W

Hostyn is an unincorporated community in central Fayette County, Texas, United States.

It was settled by Czech settlers and named after Hostýn, a hill in Moravia, Czech Republic.
