= Stella, Fayette County, Texas =

Ghost town in western Fayette County, Texas

Coordinates: 29°53′26″N 97°08′26″W

Stella is a ghost town in western Fayette County, Texas. The community was located eight miles southwest of West Point.

Settled during the 1870s, a post office number the name "Stellar" opened in the 1880. A store and a voting precinct had been established by 1900 for the scattered populace.

The store closed, leading to the end of the post office in 1909. Depletion of the rocky and sandy soils followed, and farmland became unimproved pasture covered with post oak.

During the 1980s oil drilling activity occurred and people used the area as a source for rock and gravel.
