= Engle, Texas =

Unincorporated community in Texas, US

Coordinates: 29°40′52″N 97°00′34″W

Engle is an unincorporated community in southern Fayette County, Texas, United States.
