= Giddings High School =

Public high school

Coordinates: 30.2021°N 96.9309°W

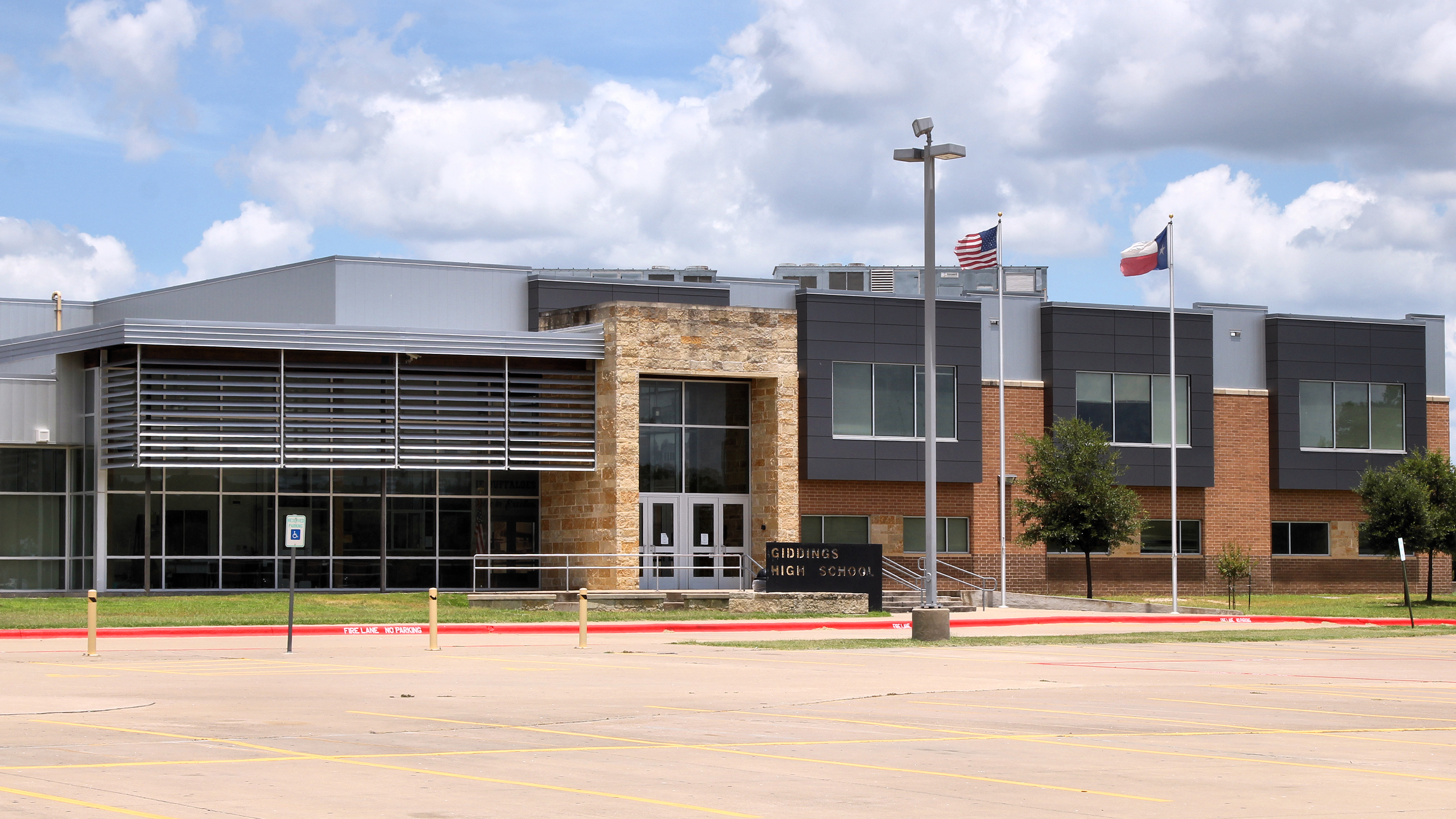

Location
- 2337 N Main St. Giddings, Texas 78942-0339; United States

Information
- School type: Public high school
- School district: Giddings Independent School District
- Principal: Chad Seitz
- Grades: 9-12
- Enrollment: 583 (2025-2026)
- Colors: Black & Gold
- Athletics conference: UIL Class 4A
- Mascot: Buffalo
- Yearbook: The Herd
- Website: Giddings High School

Giddings High School is a public high school located in the city of Giddings, Texas, United States and classified as a 4A school by the University Interscholastic League (UIL). It is a part of the Giddings Independent School District located in south central Lee County. In 2015, the school was rated "Met Standard" by the Texas Education Agency.

== Athletics ==
The Giddings Buffaloes compete in these sports:

Volleyball, Cross Country, Football, Basketball, Powerlifting, Soccer, Golf, Tennis, Track, Baseball and Softball.

=== State titles ===
- Football
  - 1951(1A)
- Boys Track
  - 1987(3A)
