= Bluff, Texas =

Unincorporated community in Texas, US

Coordinates: 29°53′11″N 96°52′18″W

Bluff is an unincorporated community in central Fayette County, Texas, United States.
