= New Mexico State Road 128 =

Highway in New Mexico

State Road 128
- NM 128 highlighted in red

Route information
- Maintained by NMDOT
- Length: 59.979 mi (96.527 km)

Major junctions
- West end: NM 31 near Loving
- NM 18 in Jal
- East end: SH 128 / FM 1218 at the Texas border near Jal

Location
- Country: United States
- State: New Mexico
- Counties: Eddy, Lea

Highway system
- New Mexico State Highway System; Interstate; US; State; Scenic
← NM 127	→ NM 129

New Mexico State Road 128 (NM 128) is a 59.979-mile-long (96.527 km) state road in the U.S. state of New Mexico. The route runs through the southeastern part of the state from NM 31 east of Loving in a southeasterly direction to Texas State Highway 128 (TX 128) at the Texas state line; it mainly passes through unpopulated semi-arid land, though it also serves the city of Jal. NM 28 is maintained by the New Mexico Department of Transportation (NMDOT).

== Route description ==
NM 128 begins at a rural intersection with NM 31 in Eddy County. NM 31 continues west to U.S. Route 285 in Loving, which provides access to the larger city of Carlsbad; it also connects NM 128 to U.S. Route 62 and U.S. Route 180 to the north. From here, the road heads east through a semi-arid region dotted with potash mines. After passing south of the Waste Isolation Pilot Plant, the road turns to the southeast. It curves eastward again, crossing into Lea County and heading toward the city of Jal. In Jal, the road becomes known as Kansas Avenue and intersects NM 205 and NM 18. It leaves the city to the east, passing the general aviation Lea County Jal Airport and continuing through semi-arid rural land. The route ends at the Texas state line, where it continues eastward as TX 128.

== Major intersections ==
County	Location	mi	km	Destinations	Notes
Eddy		0.000	0.000	NM 31 to US 62 / US 180 / US 285	Western terminus; to US 62 and US 180 via NM 31 northbound; to US 285 via NM 31 southbound
Lea	Jal	51.365	82.664	NM 205 south (North 3rd Street) – Business District, City Hall, Library	Northern terminus of NM 205
Lea	Jal	51.599	83.041	NM 18 – Eunice, Kermit TX	
Lea		59.979	96.527	SH 128 east FM 1218 south to FM 874	Continuation into Texas; eastern terminus
1.000 mi = 1.609 km; 1.000 km = 0.621 mi
