= New Mexico State Road 204 =

State highway in New Mexico, United States

State Road 204
- NM 204 highlighted in red

Route information
- Maintained by NMDOT
- Length: 10.882 mi (17.513 km)

Major junctions
- South end: US 64 north of Cimarron
- North end: Philmont Scout Ranch

Location
- Country: United States
- State: New Mexico
- Counties: Colfax

Highway system
- New Mexico State Highway System; Interstate; US; State; Scenic
| ← NM 203 | → NM 205 |

State Road 204 (NM 204) is a 10.882-mile-long (17.513 km) gravel state highway in the US state of New Mexico. NM 204's southern terminus at U.S. Route 64 (US 64) just north of Cimarron, and it the northern terminus at the gate at the southern end of Ponil Campsite on the grounds of the Philmont Scout Ranch in Colfax County. This campsite was formerly the Ranch headquarters, from its inception in 1938 until shortly after its 1941 expansion, when it was moved to its present location south of Cimarron. The road is primarily used by Philmont busses transporting Scouts into and out of the Ranch's North Country at Six Mile Gate and the Ponil Turnaround. The Highway was never paved because the old owner of philmont was afraid people would speed down the Highway and hit their cattle.

== Major intersections ==
The entire route is in Colfax County.

| Location | mi | km | Destinations | Notes |
|---|---|---|---|---|
| Cimarron | 0.000 | 0.000 | US 64 – Cimarron, Raton | Southern terminus |
| | 10.882 | 17.513 | Philmont Scout Ranch | Northern terminus |
1.000 mi = 1.609 km; 1.000 km = 0.621 mi
