= Kirtley, Texas =

Unincorporated community in Texas, US

Coordinates: 29°58′02″N 97°05′52″W

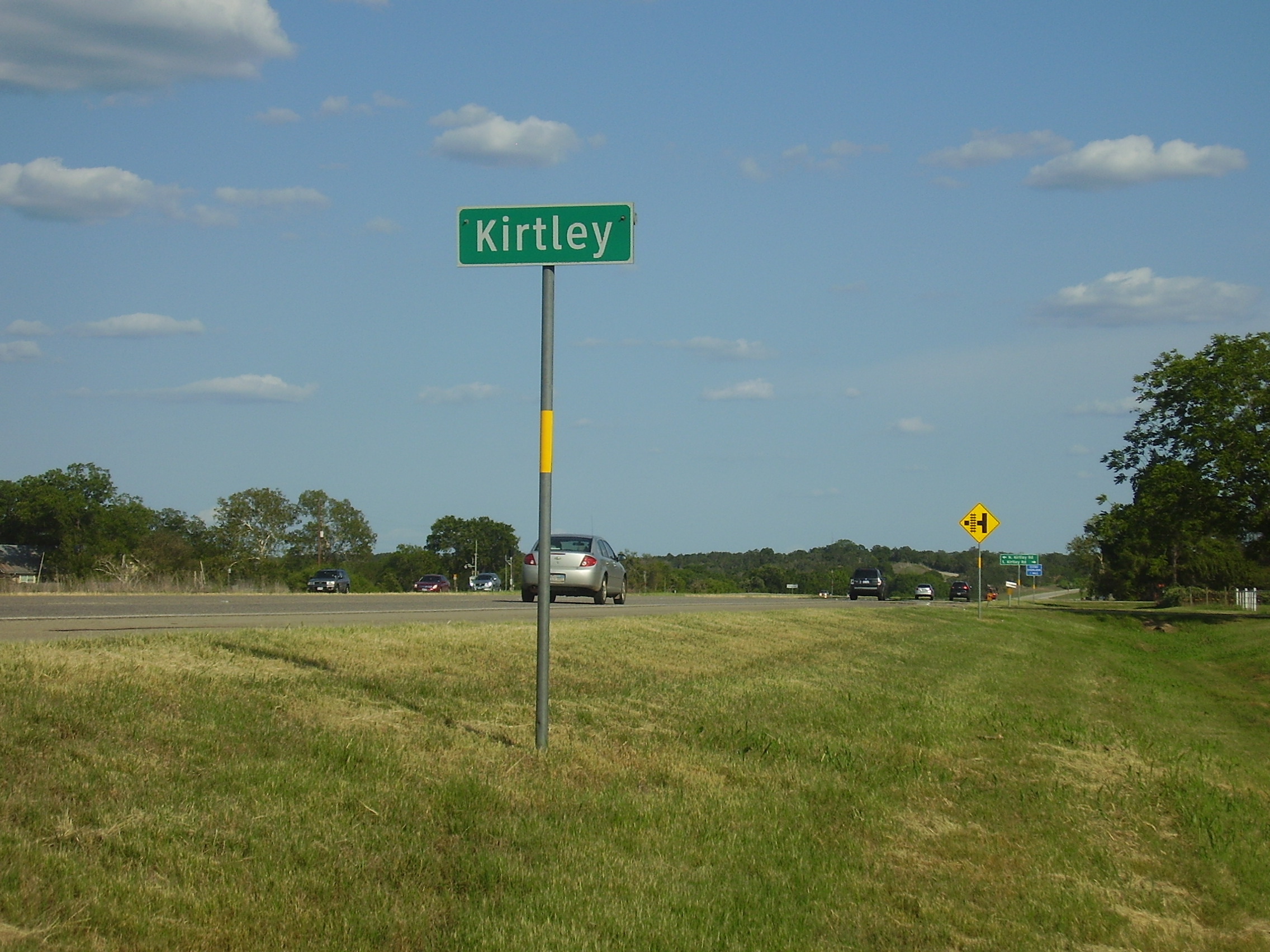
Kirtley

Kirtley is an unincorporated community in west central Fayette County, Texas, United States. It was once known as Primm.

== Location ==
Kirtley is located on the highway TX-71 and the Missouri, Kansas, and Texas Railroad (MK&T).

== William Primm ==
Dr. William Primm, for whom the town was originally named, was an early colonist from a family of wealthy aristocrats in Virginia. He owned a plantation on more than a league of land in western Fayette County, with 2,200 acres under cultivation. After emancipation, Primm's plantation employed 80 tenants to maintain its reputation as one of the best plantations in the area. A total of 600 to 900 bales of cotton were harvested annually.

== Original town ==
In the early 1900s, Kirtley was a functioning community. A post office operated from 1902 to 1927, and two schools (grades one through seven) segregated. In the 1934-35 school year, 35 white students and 38 African American students were enrolled in Kirtley schools.

The main industry in Kirtley (then Primm) was farming, replaced in the latter half of the 20th century by sand and gravel mining. Farmers in the area raised cotton, corn, and sugarcane. Convicts from the La Grange jail were transported by train to work in Kirtley's fields in the early 1900s.

A Mr. Inge owned a grocery store in the old town, and Anton Elias owned a cotton gin and a saloon. These businesses were located across the railroad tracks from the main road, which led from La Grange to Smithville

Some of the early settlers included the families of Tom Mikulenka, Jim and Bill Richards, Henry Miller, and Henry Tanecka. These were primarily cotton, corn, and sugarcane farmers.

The cemetery around which the town was centered, on land originally owned by Dr. Primm, held some of his family members' burial sites. Among these were his wife Seelia and his son, St. John. The cemetery was surveyed in 1958 by Joe Cole and in 1965 by Norman Krischke, and only six graves were found. Nothing but a large gravel pit could be found at the site in 1986.

== Name change ==
Kirtley was originally settled by Dr. William Primm, who owned a portion of land surrounding Primm's Lake beginning in 1840. Prior to Primm, the land was privately owned by William Barton.

On the morning of April 7, 1912, the MK&T train #5, with engine MK&T 367, was called out of Smithville for an 8:00am route. On board were conductor Rice, brakemen Adams and Wallace, engineer Farris, and foreman Donnell. The train was scheduled to meet train #6, which was set to leave northbound out of Houston at 2:00am. Train #6, with MK&T engine 544, was a fast freight train with no passengers aboard. On board were conductor Scoggins, brakemen Jones and Rightmer, engineer Hawkins, and foreman Brown.

At Fayetteville, #5 was to be the restricted train when it met #6 at Primm, the railroad name for which was Prim. The crew on #5, however, only glanced over their orders and the engineer (C. Farris) read Prim as Plum. The two trains met and collided at West Point Hill right after the curve off Barton Creek. The collision resulted in no casualties, but it was determined that Prim was too similar to Plum in name. Following this, Primm was changed to Kirtley, after the postmaster of the town.

== Current ==
Today, many nearby residents are unaware or unconvinced of any previous settlement in the area. Gravel and sand mining are prevalent in the area and the highway alongside Kirtley Road is lined with construction companies and sand or gravel wholesalers.
