= New Mexico State Road 31 =

State highway in New Mexico, United States

State Road 31

Route information
- Maintained by NMDOT
- Length: 22.676 mi (36.493 km)

Major junctions
- South end: US 285 by Loving
- North end: US 62 / US 180

Location
- Country: United States
- State: New Mexico
- Counties: Eddy

Highway system
- New Mexico State Highway System; Interstate; US; State; Scenic
| ← NM 30 | → NM 32 |

State Road 31 (NM 31) is a state highway in the US state of New Mexico. Its total length is approximately 22.7 miles (36.5 km). NM 31's southern terminus is by the village of Loving at U.S. Route 285 (US 285), and the northern terminus is at US 62/US 180.

== Major intersections ==
The entire route is in Eddy County.

| Location | mi | km | Destinations | Notes |
|---|---|---|---|---|
| Loving | 0.000 | 0.000 | US 285 | Southern terminus |
| | 7.631 | 12.281 | NM 128 east | Western terminus of NM 128 |
| | 22.676 | 36.493 | US 62 / US 180 | Northern terminus |
1.000 mi = 1.609 km; 1.000 km = 0.621 mi
