= Fayette County, Texas =

County in Texas, United States

- County
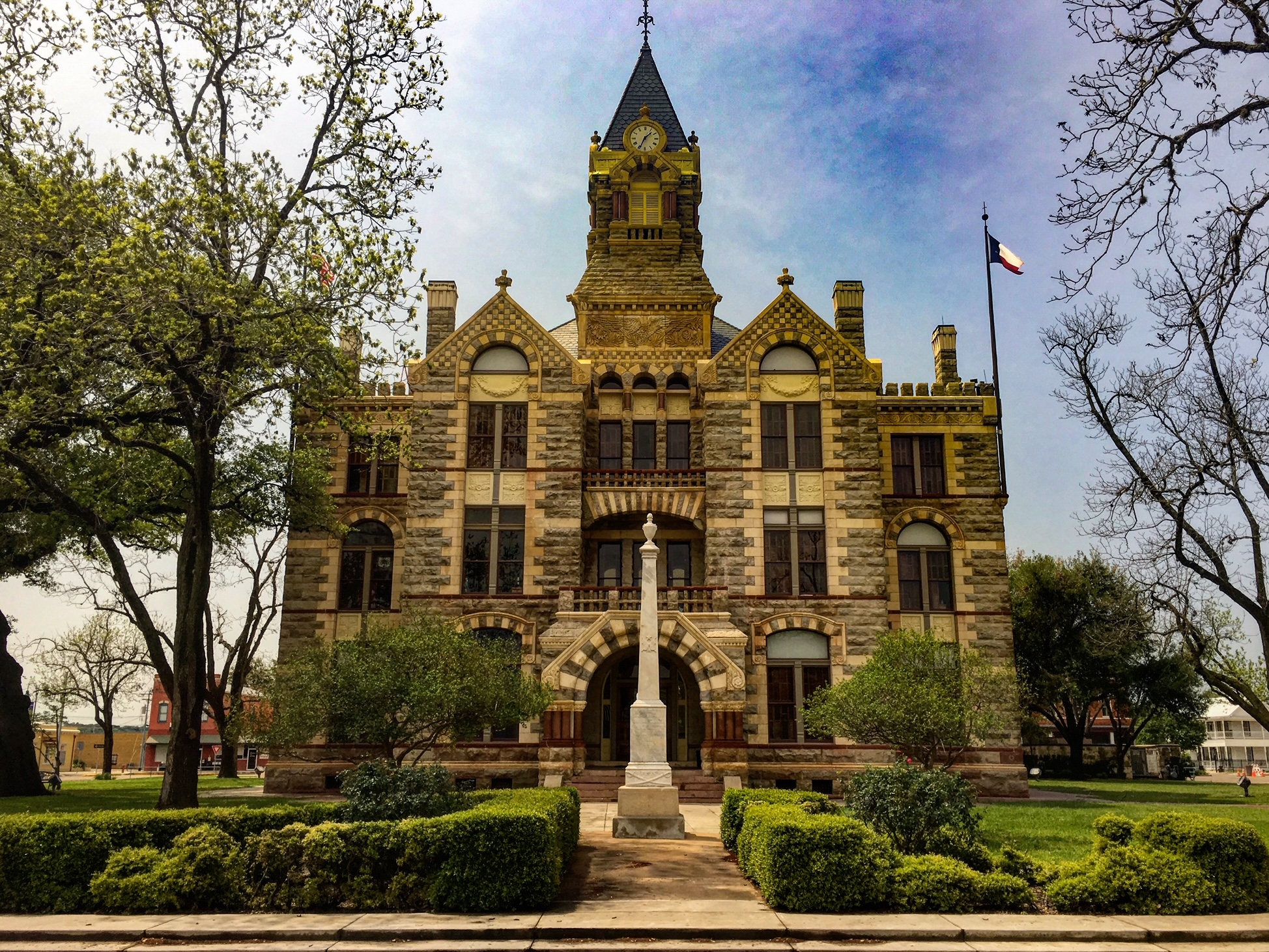
- The current Fayette County Courthouse in La Grange was finished in 1891. The Romanesque Revival-style building uses four types of native Texas stone to detail the exterior.

- Location within the U.S. state of Texas
- Coordinates: 29°52′N 96°56′W
- Country: United States
- State: Texas
- Founded: 1837
- Named for: Marquis de la Fayette
- Seat: La Grange
- Largest city: La Grange

Area
  - Total: 960 sq mi (2,500 km^{2})
  - Land: 950 sq mi (2,500 km^{2})
  - Water: 9.8 sq mi (25 km^{2}) 1.0%

Population (2020)
  - Total: 24,435
  - Estimate (2025): 25,459 ▲
  - Density: 26/sq mi (9.9/km^{2})
- Time zone: UTC−6 (Central)
  - Summer (DST): UTC−5 (CDT)
- Congressional district: 10th
- Website: www.co.fayette.tx.us

Fayette County is a county located in the U.S. state of Texas. As of the 2020 census, its population was 24,435. Its county seat is La Grange. The county was created in 1837 and organized the next year. Fayette County was settled by German and Czech emigrants in the mid 1830's. The county lies in the Texas German belt, a fragmented belt of German towns throughout central Texas.

== History ==
Fayette County was established in 1837 from land given by Bastrop and Colorado Counties. It is named for the Marquis de Lafayette, a French nobleman who became an American Revolutionary War hero.

An early resident of Brazoria County and then Fayette County, Joel Walter Robison fought in the Texas Revolution and served in the Texas House of Representatives.

More than a dozen historic properties are listed on the National Register of Historic Places in Fayette County.

Fayette County is the location of the real Chicken Ranch, which was the basis of the musical play and feature film The Best Little Whorehouse in Texas.

== Geography ==
According to the U.S. Census Bureau, the county has a total area of 960 square miles (2,500 km^{2}), of which 9.8 sq mi (25 km^{2}) (1.0%) are covered by water.

=== Adjacent counties ===
- Lee County (north)
- Washington County (northeast)
- Austin County (east)
- Colorado County (southeast)
- Lavaca County (south)
- Gonzales County (southwest)
- Caldwell County (west)
- Bastrop County (northwest)

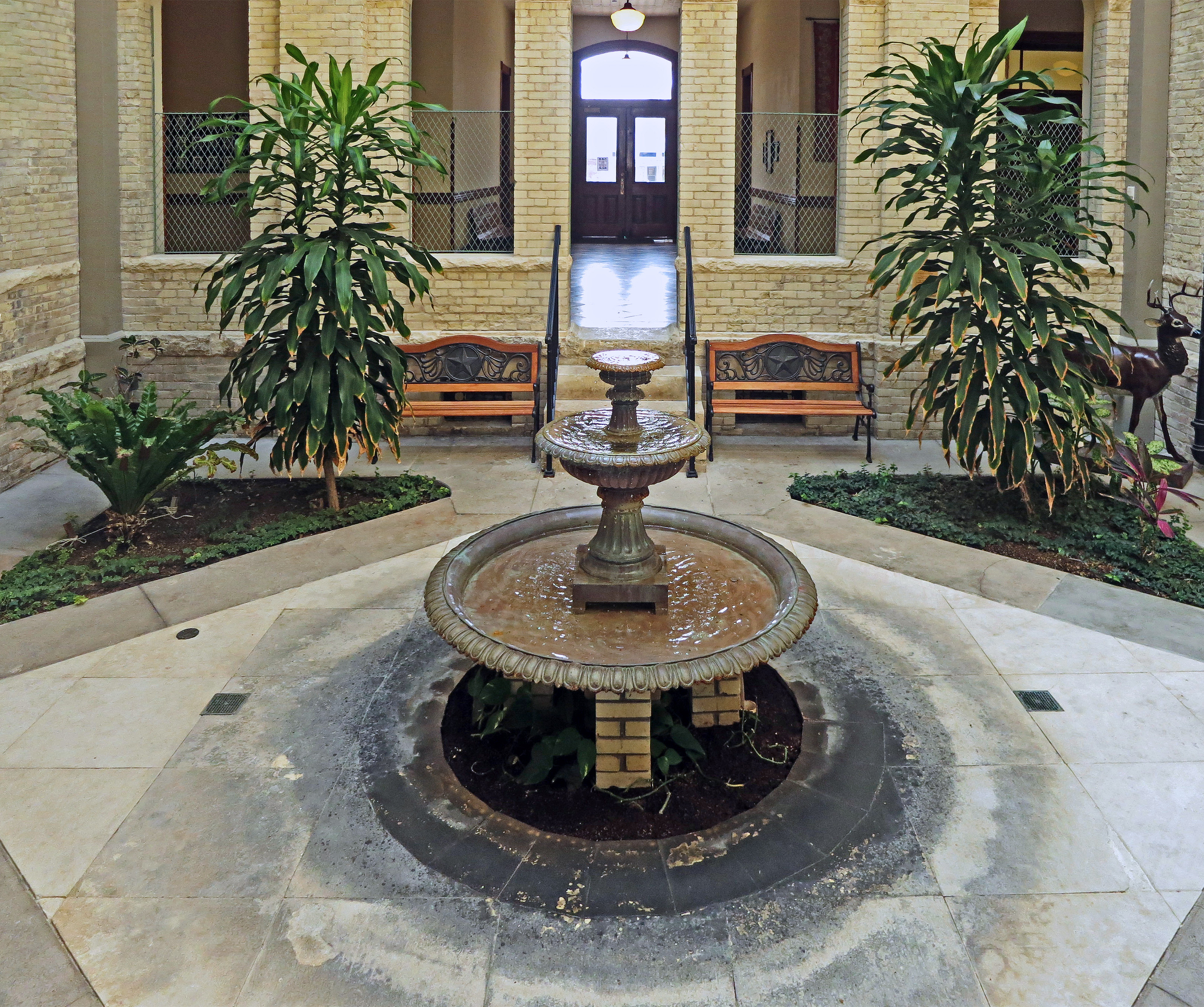
Atrium in Courthouse

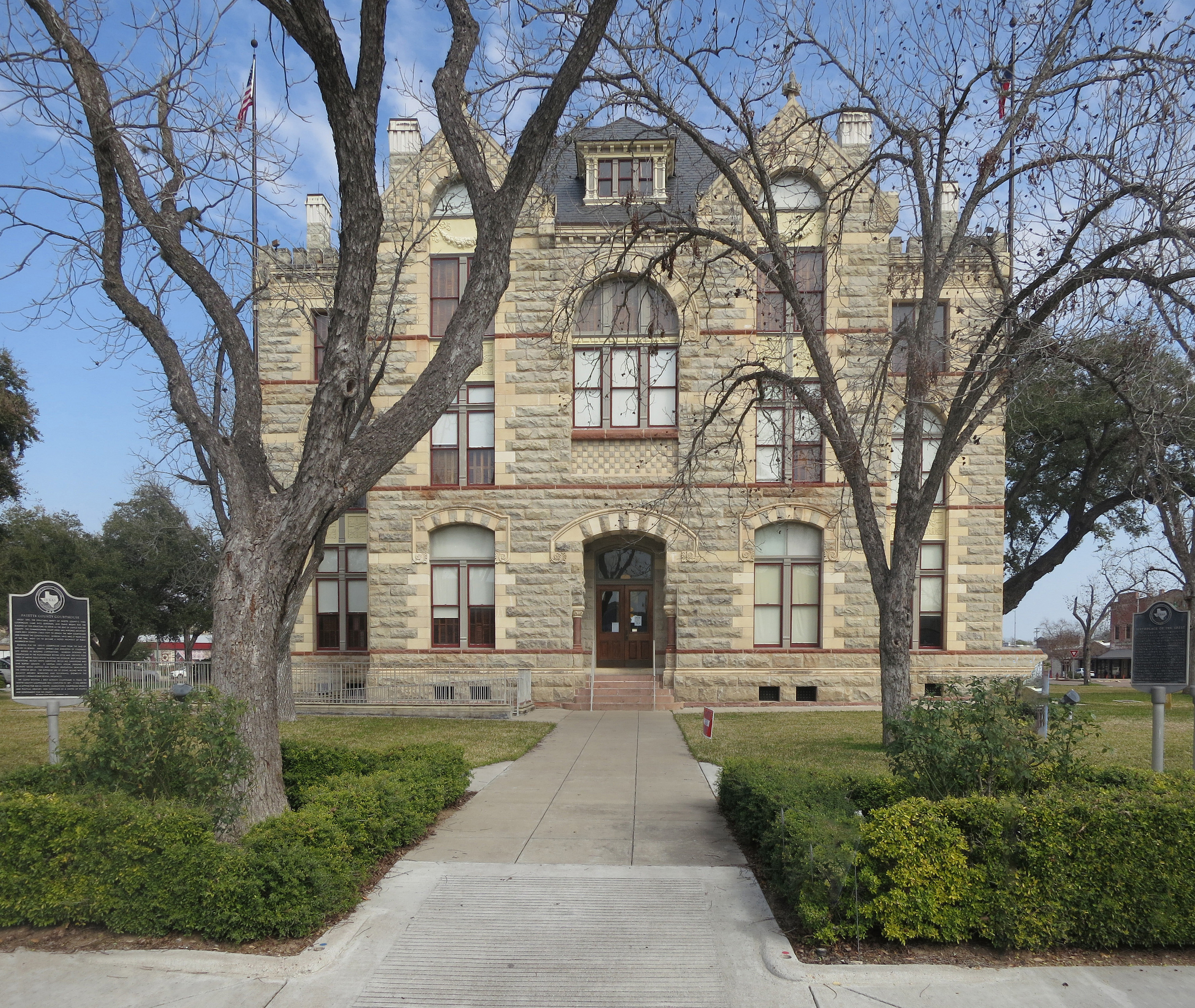
Back of Courthouse

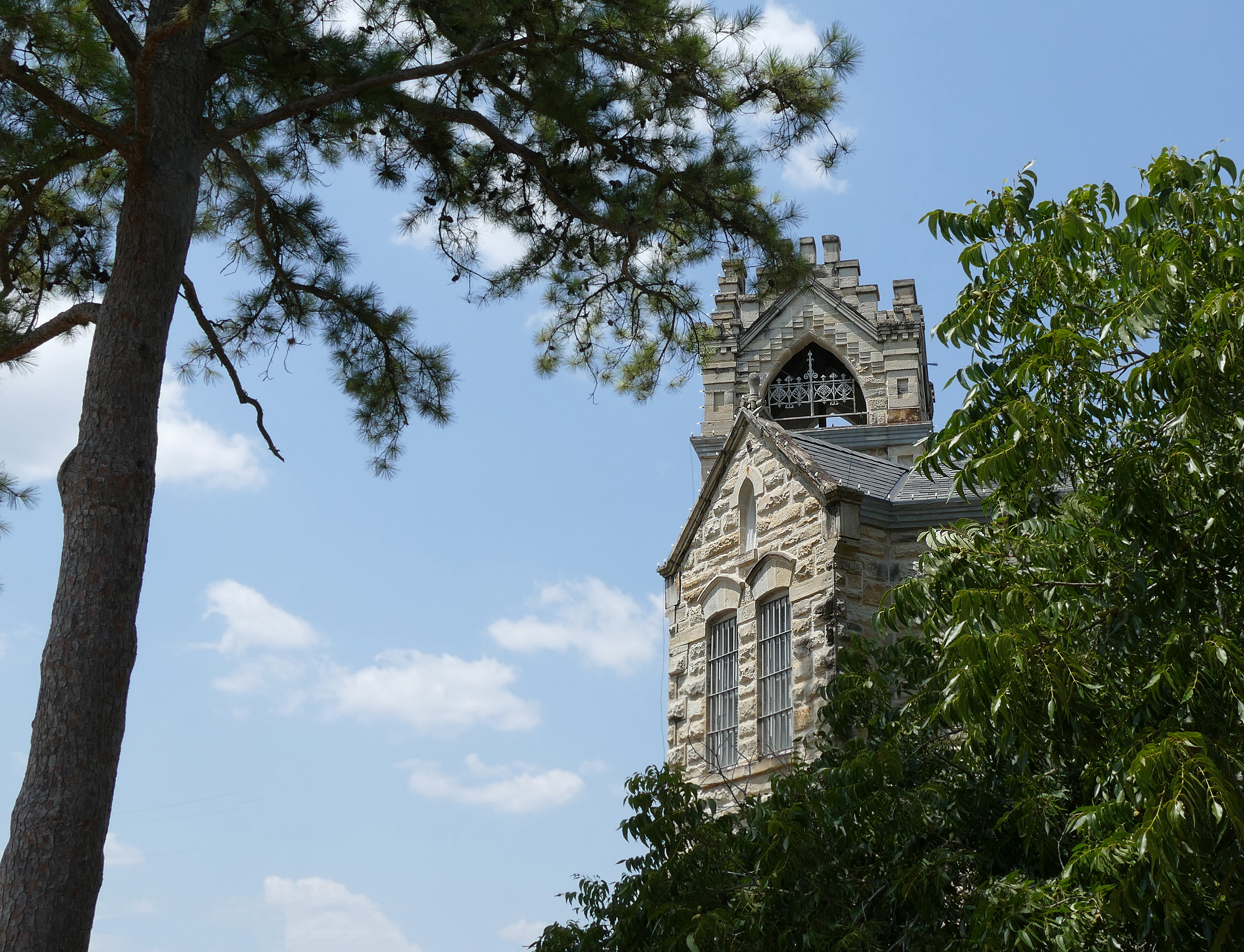
Old County Jail

== Demographics ==
Historical population
| Census | Pop. | Note | %± |
|---|---|---|---|
| 1850 | 3,756 | | — |
| 1860 | 11,604 | | 208.9% |
| 1870 | 16,863 | | 45.3% |
| 1880 | 27,996 | | 66.0% |
| 1890 | 31,481 | | 12.4% |
| 1900 | 36,542 | | 16.1% |
| 1910 | 29,796 | | −18.5% |
| 1920 | 29,965 | | 0.6% |
| 1930 | 30,708 | | 2.5% |
| 1940 | 29,246 | | −4.8% |
| 1950 | 24,176 | | −17.3% |
| 1960 | 20,384 | | −15.7% |
| 1970 | 17,650 | | −13.4% |
| 1980 | 18,832 | | 6.7% |
| 1990 | 20,095 | | 6.7% |
| 2000 | 21,804 | | 8.5% |
| 2010 | 24,554 | | 12.6% |
| 2020 | 24,435 | | −0.5% |
| 2025 (est.) | 25,459 | ▲ | 4.2% |
U.S. Decennial Census; 1850–2010 2010 2020

=== Racial and ethnic composition ===
Fayette County, Texas – Racial and ethnic composition Note: the US Census treats Hispanic/Latino as an ethnic category. This table excludes Latinos from the racial categories and assigns them to a separate category. Hispanics/Latinos may be of any race.
| Race / Ethnicity (NH = Non-Hispanic) | Pop 1980 | Pop 1990 | Pop 2000 | Pop 2010 | Pop 2020 | % 1980 | % 1990 | % 2000 | % 2010 | % 2020 |
|---|---|---|---|---|---|---|---|---|---|---|
| White alone (NH) | 16,138 | 16,678 | 17,271 | 18,038 | 17,041 | 85.69% | 83.00% | 79.21% | 73.46% | 69.74% |
| Black or African American alone (NH) | 1,682 | 1,662 | 1,508 | 1,599 | 1,383 | 8.93% | 8.27% | 6.92% | 6.51% | 5.66% |
| Native American or Alaska Native alone (NH) | 26 | 23 | 61 | 69 | 50 | 0.14% | 0.11% | 0.28% | 0.28% | 0.20% |
| Asian alone (NH) | 12 | 13 | 49 | 61 | 67 | 0.06% | 0.06% | 0.22% | 0.25% | 0.27% |
| Native Hawaiian or Pacific Islander alone (NH) | x | x | 6 | 6 | 6 | x | x | 0.03% | 0.02% | 0.02% |
| Other race alone (NH) | 6 | 17 | 8 | 25 | 72 | 0.03% | 0.08% | 0.04% | 0.10% | 0.29% |
| Mixed race or Multiracial (NH) | x | x | 115 | 171 | 600 | x | x | 0.53% | 0.70% | 2.46% |
| Hispanic or Latino (any race) | 968 | 1,702 | 2,786 | 4,585 | 5,216 | 5.14% | 8.47% | 12.78% | 18.67% | 21.35% |
| Total | 18,832 | 20,095 | 21,804 | 24,554 | 24,435 | 100.00% | 100.00% | 100.00% | 100.00% | 100.00% |

=== 2020 census ===
As of the 2020 census, the county had a population of 24,435. The median age was 49.1 years. 20.6% of residents were under the age of 18 and 27.4% of residents were 65 years of age or older. For every 100 females there were 95.0 males, and for every 100 females age 18 and over there were 93.7 males age 18 and over.

The racial makeup of the county was 74.8% White, 6.0% Black or African American, 0.7% American Indian and Alaska Native, 0.3% Asian, <0.1% Native Hawaiian and Pacific Islander, 7.9% from some other race, and 10.3% from two or more races. Hispanic or Latino residents of any race comprised 21.3% of the population.

20.5% of residents lived in urban areas, while 79.5% lived in rural areas.

There were 10,162 households in the county, of which 26.3% had children under the age of 18 living in them. Of all households, 54.6% were married-couple households, 16.9% were households with a male householder and no spouse or partner present, and 24.3% were households with a female householder and no spouse or partner present. About 28.4% of all households were made up of individuals and 16.5% had someone living alone who was 65 years of age or older.

There were 13,122 housing units, of which 22.6% were vacant. Among occupied housing units, 78.1% were owner-occupied and 21.9% were renter-occupied. The homeowner vacancy rate was 1.9% and the rental vacancy rate was 7.6%.

=== 2000 census ===
As of the 2000 census, 21,804 people, 8,722 households, and 6,044 families resided in the county. The population density was 23 people per square mile (8.9 people/km^{2}). The 11,113 housing units averaged 12 units per square mile (4.6/km^{2}). The racial makeup of the county was 84.58% White, 7.01% African American, 0.36% Native American, 0.22% Asian, 6.72% from other races, and 1.11% from two or more races. About 12.78% of the population were Hispanic or Latino of any race; 34.9% were of German, 16.4% Czech, 7.6% American, and 5.3% English ancestry according to Census 2000.

Of the 8,722 households, 28.5% had children under 18 living with them, 58.0% were married couples living together, 7.8% had a female householder with no husband present, and 30.7% were not families. About 28.0% of all households were made up of individuals, and 16.4% had someone living alone who was 65 or older. The average household size was 2.44 and the average family size was 2.97.

In the county, the population was distributed as 23.2% under the age of 18, 7.0% from 18 to 24, 23.6% from 25 to 44, 24.2% from 45 to 64, and 22.0% who were 65 or older. The median age was 43 years. For every 100 females, there were 93.7 males. For every 100 females 18 and over, there were 91.0 males.

The median income for a household in the county was $34,526, and for a family was $43,156. Males had a median income of $29,008 versus $20,859 for females. The per capita income for the county was $18,888. About 8.10% of families and 11.40% of the population were below the poverty line, including 12.70% of those under age 18 and 13.50% of those age 65 or over.

=== Religion ===
Christianity is the most widely practiced religion, followed by Judaism.

== Transportation ==
=== Airport ===
The county owns Fayette Regional Air Center, in an unincorporated area west of LaGrange.

=== Major highways ===
- Interstate 10
- U.S. Highway 77
- U.S. Highway 90
- U.S. Highway 290
- State Highway 71
- State Highway 95
- State Highway 159
- State Highway 237
- Loop 220
- Loop 222
- Loop 543
- Spur 92
- Spur 458

== Media ==
Fayette County is home to three newspapers and two radio stations.

=== Newspapers ===
- Fayette County Record
- Schulenburg Sticker
- Flatonia Argus

=== Radio ===
- KVLG/KBUK
- KTIMe

== Communities ==
=== Cities ===
- Carmine
- Ellinger
- Fayetteville
- La Grange (county seat)
- Schulenburg

=== Towns ===
- Flatonia
- Round Top

=== Census-designated place ===
- Plum

=== Unincorporated communities ===
- Ammannsville
- Cistern
- Dubina
- Engle
- Freyburg
- High Hill
- Holman
- Hostyn
- Kirtley
- Ledbetter
- Muldoon
- Mullins Prairie
- Nechanitz
- O'Quinn
- Oldenburg
- Park
- Praha
- Rabbs Prairie
- Rek Hill
- Roznov
- Rutersville
- Swiss Alp
- Waldeck
- Walhalla
- Warda
- Warrenton
- West Point
- Willow Springs
- Winchester
- Winedale

=== Ghost towns ===
- Biegel
- Black Jack Springs
- Bluff
- Gay Hill
- Haw Creek
- Stella

== Politics ==
United States presidential election results for Fayette County, Texas
| Year | Republican | | Democratic | | Third party(ies) | |
| Year | No. | % | No. | % | No. | % |
|---|---|---|---|---|---|---|
| 1912 | 461 | 17.16% | 2,011 | 74.84% | 215 | 8.00% |
| 1916 | 1,212 | 38.35% | 1,902 | 60.19% | 46 | 1.46% |
| 1920 | 1,101 | 24.32% | 932 | 20.59% | 2,494 | 55.09% |
| 1924 | 1,450 | 22.46% | 3,851 | 59.66% | 1,154 | 17.88% |
| 1928 | 689 | 15.87% | 3,647 | 84.01% | 5 | 0.12% |
| 1932 | 245 | 4.68% | 4,985 | 95.26% | 3 | 0.06% |
| 1936 | 595 | 17.40% | 2,820 | 82.46% | 5 | 0.15% |
| 1940 | 2,441 | 48.32% | 2,606 | 51.58% | 5 | 0.10% |
| 1944 | 1,611 | 26.72% | 3,156 | 52.34% | 1,263 | 20.95% |
| 1948 | 1,737 | 32.79% | 3,106 | 58.63% | 455 | 8.59% |
| 1952 | 4,240 | 62.35% | 2,557 | 37.60% | 3 | 0.04% |
| 1956 | 3,574 | 60.54% | 2,282 | 38.65% | 48 | 0.81% |
| 1960 | 2,213 | 38.83% | 3,462 | 60.75% | 24 | 0.42% |
| 1964 | 2,036 | 35.86% | 3,630 | 63.94% | 11 | 0.19% |
| 1968 | 2,380 | 41.21% | 1,833 | 31.74% | 1,562 | 27.05% |
| 1972 | 3,882 | 73.37% | 1,400 | 26.46% | 9 | 0.17% |
| 1976 | 3,030 | 46.67% | 3,428 | 52.80% | 35 | 0.54% |
| 1980 | 4,104 | 60.32% | 2,590 | 38.07% | 110 | 1.62% |
| 1984 | 5,711 | 70.40% | 2,379 | 29.33% | 22 | 0.27% |
| 1988 | 4,551 | 57.09% | 3,390 | 42.53% | 30 | 0.38% |
| 1992 | 3,789 | 42.94% | 2,923 | 33.13% | 2,111 | 23.93% |
| 1996 | 4,195 | 52.00% | 3,119 | 38.66% | 754 | 9.35% |
| 2000 | 6,658 | 70.93% | 2,542 | 27.08% | 187 | 1.99% |
| 2004 | 7,527 | 72.40% | 2,803 | 26.96% | 67 | 0.64% |
| 2008 | 7,582 | 70.43% | 3,014 | 28.00% | 169 | 1.57% |
| 2012 | 8,106 | 76.61% | 2,315 | 21.88% | 160 | 1.51% |
| 2016 | 8,743 | 78.24% | 2,144 | 19.19% | 287 | 2.57% |
| 2020 | 10,171 | 78.36% | 2,661 | 20.50% | 148 | 1.14% |
| 2024 | 10,699 | 80.26% | 2,515 | 18.87% | 117 | 0.88% |

United States Senate election results for Fayette County, Texas1
| Year | Republican | | Democratic | | Third party(ies) | |
| Year | No. | % | No. | % | No. | % |
|---|---|---|---|---|---|---|
| 2024 | 10,408 | 78.34% | 2,649 | 19.94% | 228 | 1.72% |

United States Senate election results for Fayette County, Texas2
| Year | Republican | | Democratic | | Third party(ies) | |
| Year | No. | % | No. | % | No. | % |
|---|---|---|---|---|---|---|
| 2020 | 10,056 | 78.17% | 2,634 | 20.48% | 174 | 1.35% |

Texas Gubernatorial election results for Fayette County
| Year | Republican | | Democratic | | Third party(ies) | |
| Year | No. | % | No. | % | No. | % |
|---|---|---|---|---|---|---|
| 2022 | 8,649 | 82.37% | 1,748 | 16.65% | 103 | 0.98% |

At the presidential level, from 1912 through 1964, Fayette County, as was typical of the Solid South, voted predominantly for the Democratic candidate, even in 1928 with Al Smith the Democratic nominee, unlike most Texas counties. From 1972, the county has shifted to the Republican nominee.

== Education ==
School districts:

- Fayetteville Independent School District
- Flatonia Independent School District
- Giddings Independent School District
- La Grange Independent School District
- Round Top-Carmine Independent School District
- Schulenburg Independent School District
- Smithville Independent School District
- Weimar Independent School District

Most of Fayette County is assigned to Blinn Junior College District. Austin Community College is the designated community college for portions of Fayette County in Smithville ISD.

== See also ==
- Adelsverein
- Museums in Central Texas
- Nassau Plantation
- National Register of Historic Places listings in Fayette County, Texas
- Recorded Texas Historic Landmarks in Fayette County
- The Chicken Ranch, and The Best Little Whorehouse in Texas
