= Park, Texas =

Unincorporated community in Texas, US

Coordinates: 29°56′45″N 96°45′03″W

Park is an unincorporated community in eastern Fayette County, Texas, United States.
