= Rek Hill, Texas =

Unincorporated community in Texas, US

Coordinates: 29°55′57″N 96°38′25″W

Rek Hill is an unincorporated community in eastern Fayette County, Texas, United States.
