= New Mexico State Road 205 =

State highway in New Mexico, United States

State Road 205

Route information
- Maintained by NMDOT
- Length: 4.145 mi (6.671 km)

Major junctions
- South end: CR 3 near Bennett
- North end: NM 128 in Jal

Location
- Country: United States
- State: New Mexico
- Counties: Lea

Highway system
- New Mexico State Highway System; Interstate; US; State; Scenic
← NM 204	→ NM 206

State Road 205 (NM 205) is a 4.145-mile-long (6.671 km) state highway in the US state of New Mexico. NM 205's southern terminus is at County Road 3 (CR 3) southwest of Bennett, and the northern terminus is at NM 128 in Jal.

== Major intersections ==
The entire route is in Lea County.

Location	mi	km	Destinations	Notes
Jal	0.000	0.000	NM 128	Northern terminus
	4.145	6.671	CR 3	Southern terminus
1.000 mi = 1.609 km; 1.000 km = 0.621 mi
