= Walhalla, Texas =

Unincorporated community in Texas, US

Coordinates: 30°01′24″N 96°45′34″W

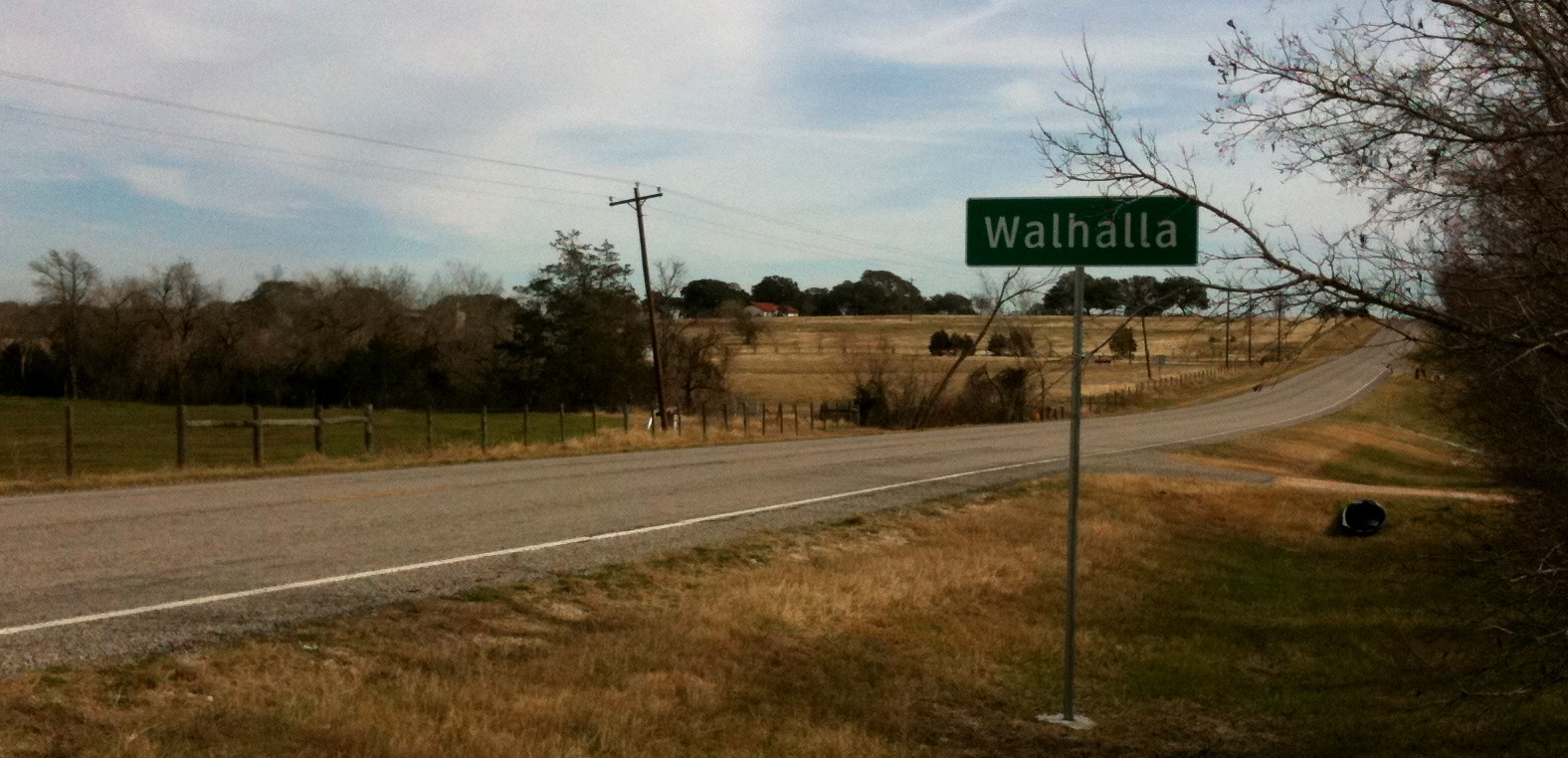
Walhalla, Texas

Walhalla is an unincorporated community in northern Fayette County, Texas, United States.

It was settled in the 1830s by German settlers.
