= Ledbetter, Texas =

Unincorporated community in Texas, US

Coordinates: 30°09′03″N 96°47′29″W

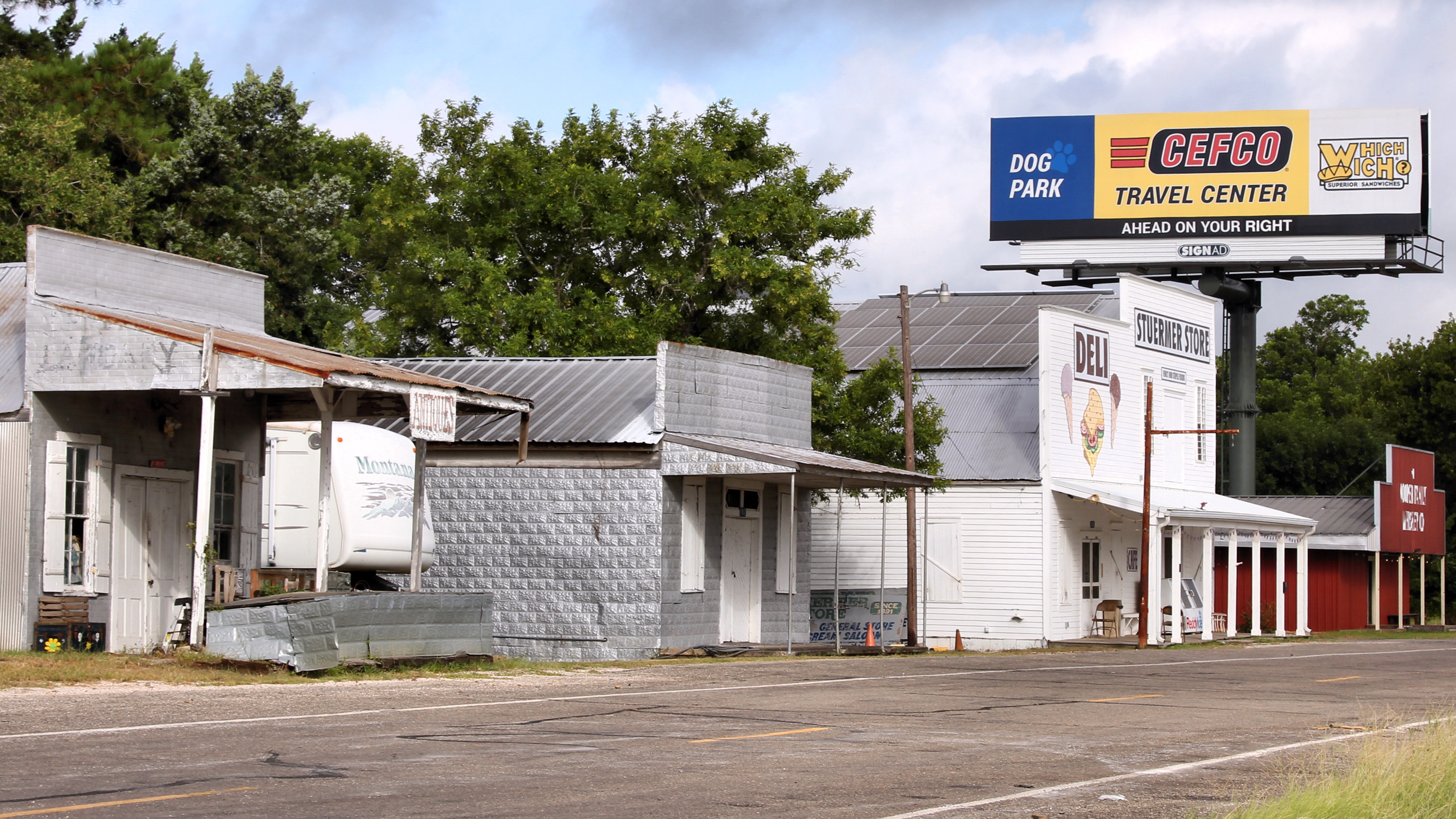
Commercial buildings along Highway 290 in Ledbetter

Ledbetter is an unincorporated community on U.S. Route 290 in far northern Fayette County, Texas, United States. Ledbetter has a post office, with the ZIP code 78946.

== Climate ==
The climate in this area is characterized by hot, humid summers and generally mild to cool winters. According to the Köppen Climate Classification system, Ledbetter has a humid subtropical climate, abbreviated "Cfa" on climate maps.
