= Swiss Alp, Texas =

Unincorporated community in Texas, US

Coordinates: 29°46′57″N 96°54′34″W

Swiss Alp is an unincorporated community in southern Fayette County, Texas, United States.

Swiss Alp was settled circa 1865 by German Lutheran settlers. In 1889–1890, the residents built a United Evangelical Lutheran Church. This church is the second oldest Lutheran congregation in Texas.
