= Freyburg, Texas =

Unincorporated community in Texas, US

Coordinates: 29°45′28″N 96°58′00″W

Freyburg is an unincorporated community in southwestern Fayette County, Texas, United States.
