= Round Top-Carmine Independent School District =

School district in Texas, United States

Address
- 608 North Washington Round Top, Texas, 78954; United States

District information
- Grades: PK–12
- Schools: 2
- NCES District ID: 4838100

Students and staff
- Students: 240 (2023–2024)
- Teachers: 23.94 (on an FTE basis)
- Student–teacher ratio: 10.03:1

Other information
- Website: www.rtcisd.net

Round Top-Carmine Independent School District is a public school district based in Carmine, Texas, United States.

In addition to Carmine, the district also serves the town of Round Top.

Round Top-Carmine ISD has two campuses - Round Top-Carmine High (Grades 7–12) and Round Top Carmine Elementary (Grades PK-6). Each grade is a single class of 17 to 23 students.

Known as "RTC" the school district is known for girls athletics with three 1A basketball and Six 1A volleyball championships.

In 2009, the school district was rated "recognized" by the Texas Education Agency.
