= Winedale, Texas =

Unincorporated community in Texas, US

Coordinates: 30°05′14″N 96°38′27″W

Winedale is an unincorporated community in Fayette County, Texas, United States.

The community was originally named Truebsal and was located in Washington County; in 1879, the post office bore the name Winedale. In 1881, the post office closed and at a certain point in time, the community moved north into Fayette County.
