= Willow Springs, Fayette County, Texas =

Unincorporated community in Texas, US

Coordinates: 29°58′00″N 96°35′56″W

Willow Springs is an unincorporated community in northeastern Fayette County, Texas, United States.

It has been named Zapp, Rock House, and German Settlement.
