= Roznov, Texas =

Unincorporated community in Texas, US

Coordinates: 29°59′04″N 96°42′30″W

Roznov is an unincorporated community in northeastern Fayette County, Texas, United States.

Named after Rožnov pod Radhoštěm, Moravia, Czech Republic, also show on maps as "Halamicek", for John Method Halamicek from Moravia, who started the town and was the postmaster.
