= Giddings, Texas =

- City
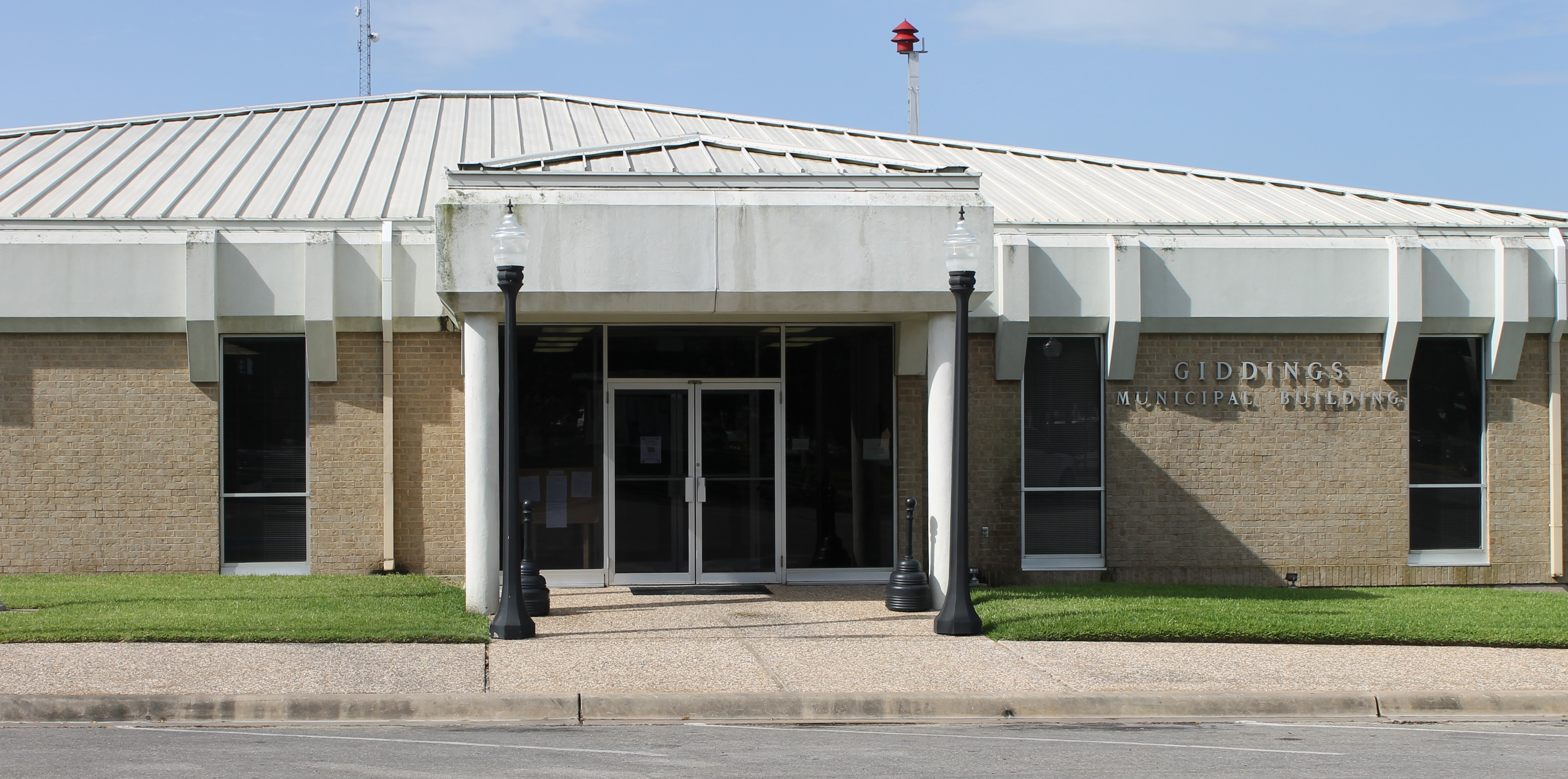
- The Giddings Municipal Building is located across from the renovated Lee County Courthouse.

- Location in Lee County in the state of Texas
- Coordinates: 30°11′00″N 96°55′41″W
- Country: United States
- State: Texas
- County: Lee

Area
  - Total: 5.31 sq mi (13.75 km^{2})
  - Land: 5.28 sq mi (13.67 km^{2})
  - Water: 0.031 sq mi (0.08 km^{2})
- Elevation: 502 ft (153 m)

Population (2020)
  - Total: 4,969
  - Density: 966/sq mi (373.1/km^{2})
- Time zone: UTC-6 (CST)
  - Summer (DST): UTC-5 (CDT)
- ZIP code: 78942
- Area code: 979
- FIPS code: 48-29432
- GNIS feature ID: 2410587
- Website: www.giddings.net

Giddings is a city in and the county seat of Lee County, Texas, United States situated on the intersection of U.S. Highway 77 and U.S. Route 290. As of the 2020 census, Giddings had a population of 4,969.

== History ==
The land where the city of Giddings now stands was part of the land granted to Stephen F. Austin in 1821 for a colony in Spanish Texas, and later became part of the Robertson's Colony.

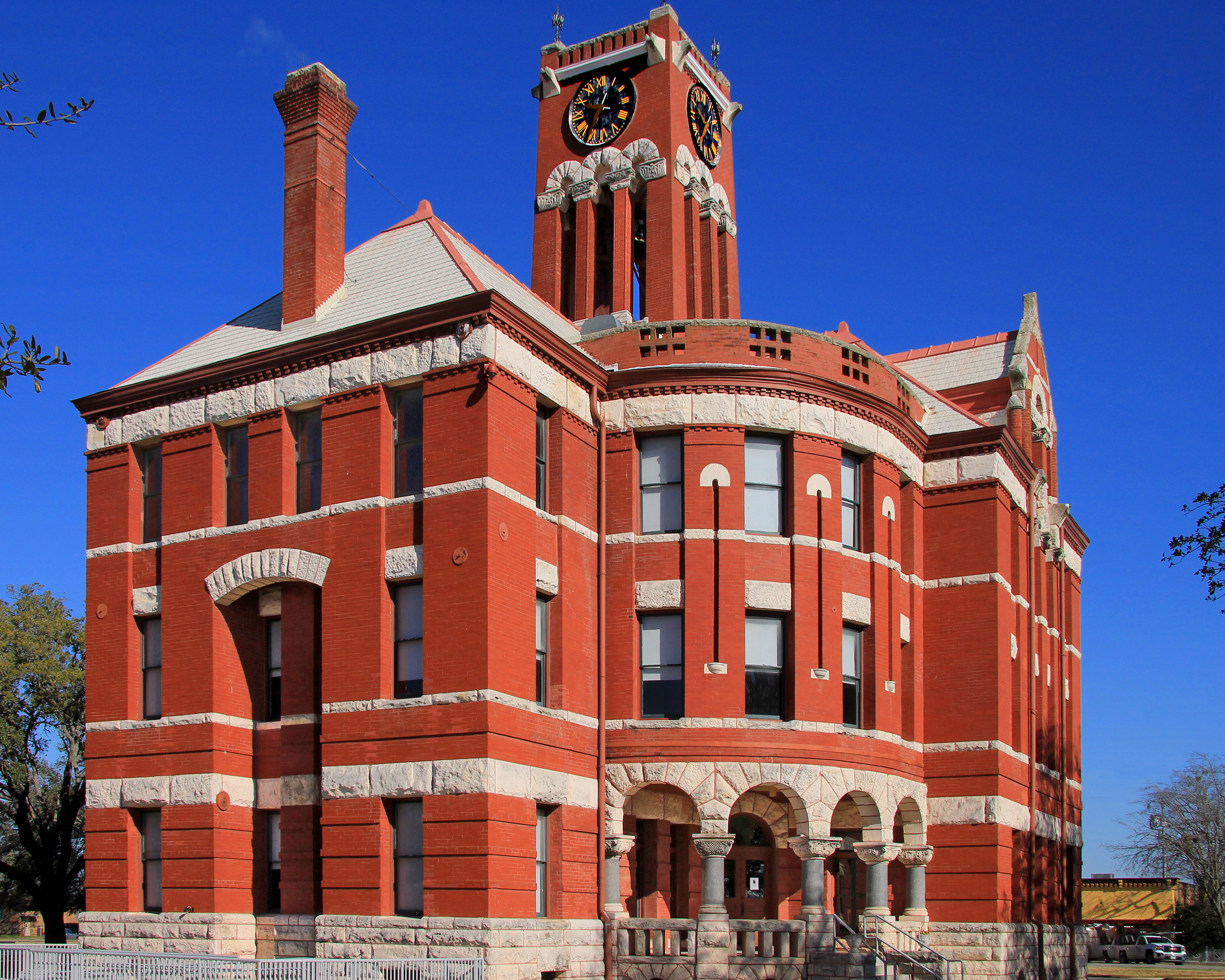
The Lee County Courthouse in Giddings (built 1899)

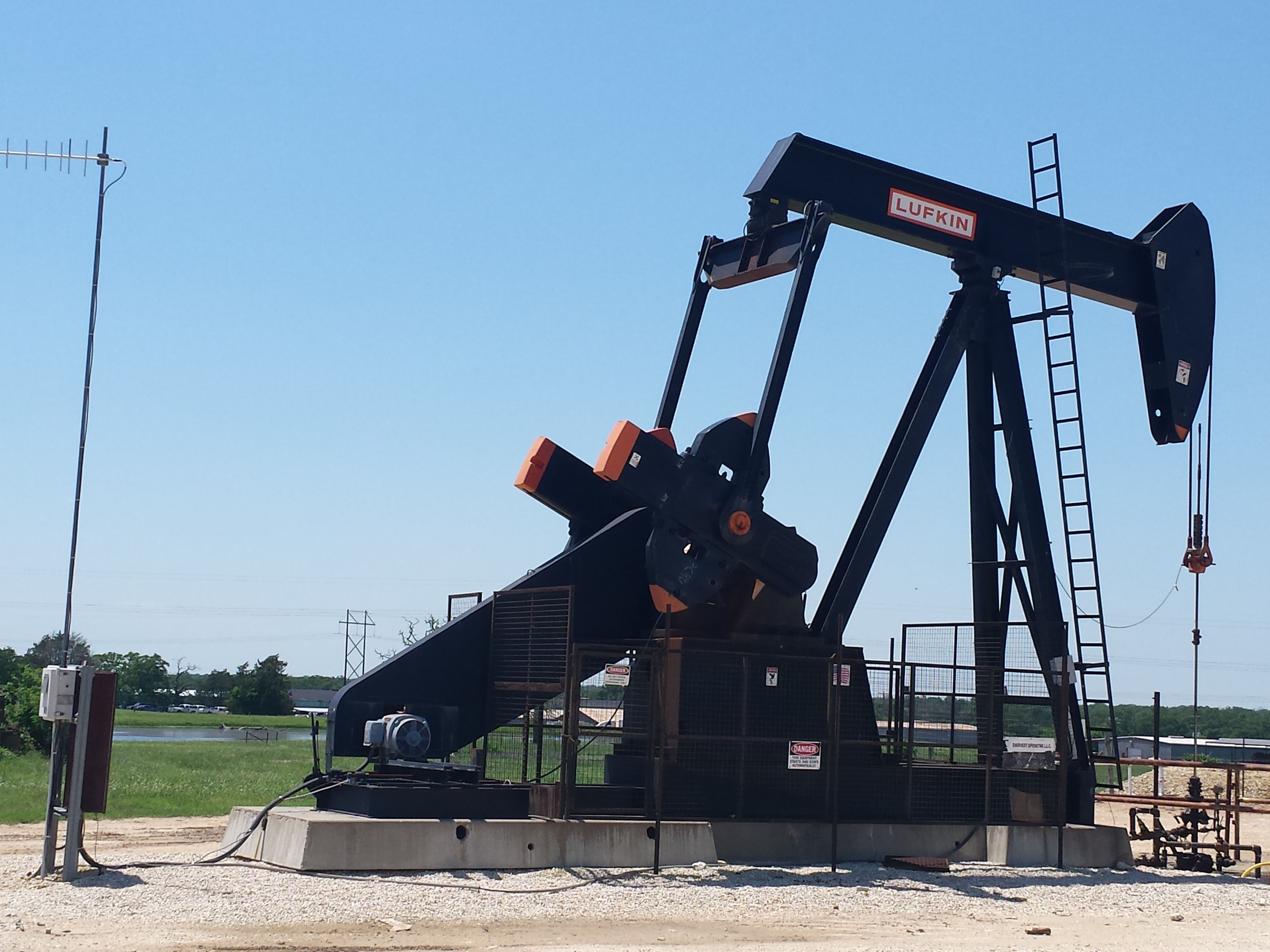
Giddings Area Pumpjack

The city itself was founded in 1871 when the Houston and Texas Central Railway came to the area. It probably took its name from local magnate Jabez Deming Giddings, who was instrumental in bringing the railway to the area. He had come to the area from Pennsylvania in 1838 to claim the land bounty of his brother Giles A. Giddings, killed at the Battle of San Jacinto. Another theory is that the city was named after Jabez's brother Dewitt Clinton Giddings.

Early settlers in the new town were mostly pioneers from the surrounding communities, such as Old Evergreen and Shady Grove. The majority of these people were ethnically British Isles natives, but a sizable minority were Wendish families from the Serbin area. They would later establish the German-language newspaper Deutsches Volksblatt.

A syndicate headed by William Marsh Rice owned the whole townsite and sold property to settlers. Later, Rice Institute (now Rice University) in Houston had control and sold the lots.

Wide streets were a distinguishing characteristic of the town; the two main thoroughfares (Main and Austin Streets) were 100 feet (30 m) wide, and other streets were 80 feet (24 m) wide. The town's first church, established in 1871, was Methodist. J. D. Giddings Masonic Lodge, chartered in Evergreen in 1865, moved to Giddings, and early churches and a public school met in its building. Soon after the Civil War, freed slaves from farms and plantations settled in Giddings. Classes for more than 50 black students were held in a church in 1883, and the first black public school was built in 1887.

Giddings became the county seat when Lee County was established in 1874. Early businesses included the Granger store, a blacksmith shop and saloon, a millinery shop, a saddle and harness shop, and an oil mill. Brick buildings came in 1875. The courthouse built in 1878 burned and was replaced in 1899. Fletcher House, built in 1879 by August W. Schubert, was sold to the Missouri Synod of the Immanuel Lutheran Church in 1894 to house Concordia Lutheran College. By 1890, the town was part of a rich cotton-growing area with access to the San Antonio and Aransas Pass Railway, several gins, an opera house, newspapers, and a population estimated at 1,000. The First National Bank was opened in 1890 and was still in operation more than a century later. The town was incorporated in 1913 and had a population of 2,000 by 1914.

In the early 1980s, the oil-laden Austin chalk that underlies the town was tapped, and the area experienced an oil boom. Some 300 oil-related businesses located in the town, and many oil rigs were operating in outlying areas. In the late 1980s, however, the oil activities decreased almost to a standstill. The population of Giddings in 1988 was 5,178. In 1990, local businesses included a hospital, a medical clinic, a dialysis clinic, a chiropractic clinic, two nursing homes, a library, motels, restaurants, two newspapers, a peanut mill, Invader Boat Manufacturing Company, and Nutrena-Cargill Mills. Nineteen churches were in the city.

== Geography ==
According to the United States Census Bureau, the city has a total area of 5.2 square miles (13 km^{2}), of which 0.04 sq mi (0.10 km^{2}) (0.58%) is covered by water.

=== Climate ===
The climate in this area is characterized by relatively high temperatures and evenly distributed precipitation throughout the year. The Köppen climate classification describes the weather as humid subtropical, Cfa.

== Demographics ==
Historical population
Census	Pop.	Note	%±
1880	624		—
1890	1,203		92.8%
1920	1,650		—
1930	1,835		11.2%
1940	2,166		18.0%
1950	2,532		16.9%
1960	2,821		11.4%
1970	2,783		−1.3%
1980	3,950		41.9%
1990	4,093		3.6%
2000	5,105		24.7%
2010	4,881		−4.4%
2020	4,969		1.8%
U.S. Decennial Census; 1850–1900 1910; 1920 1930 1940; 1950 1960 1970; 1980 1990 2000; 2010

=== Racial and ethnic composition ===
Giddings city, Texas – Racial composition
Race (NH = Non-Hispanic)	2020	2010	2000	1990	1980
White alone (NH)	37.8% (1,876)	43.3% (2,115)	50.4% (2,572)	63.6% (2,603)	71.3% (2,818)
Black alone (NH)	12.5% (623)	11.7% (572)	13% (665)	15.7% (642)	17.8% (703)
American Indian alone (NH)	0.2% (10)	0.2% (12)	0.3% (13)	0% (2)	0% (0)
Asian alone (NH)	0.6% (32)	0.8% (41)	0.6% (29)	0.2% (9)	0.2% (9)
Pacific Islander alone (NH)	0% (0)	0.1% (3)	0% (0)		
Other race alone (NH)	0.1% (7)	0% (0)	0.1% (3)	0.1% (6)	0% (0)
Multiracial (NH)	3.1% (153)	1.1% (56)	1% (50)	—	—
Hispanic/Latino (any race)	45.6% (2,268)	42.7% (2,082)	34.7% (1,773)	20.3% (831)	10.6% (420)

=== 2020 census ===
As of the 2020 census, Giddings had a population of 4,969 people, 1,777 households, and 1,364 families. The median age was 36.3 years, 27.2% of residents were under the age of 18, and 16.0% of residents were 65 years of age or older. For every 100 females there were 93.7 males, and for every 100 females age 18 and over there were 89.9 males age 18 and over.

0.0% of residents lived in urban areas, while 100.0% lived in rural areas.

Of the 1,777 households, 38.8% had children under the age of 18 living in them. Of all households, 46.5% were married-couple households, 17.8% were households with a male householder and no spouse or partner present, and 29.3% were households with a female householder and no spouse or partner present. About 25.4% of all households were made up of individuals and 11.2% had someone living alone who was 65 years of age or older.

There were 2,032 housing units, of which 12.5% were vacant. The homeowner vacancy rate was 2.9% and the rental vacancy rate was 10.9%.

Racial composition as of the 2020 census
Race	Number	Percent
White	2,414	48.6%
Black or African American	662	13.3%
American Indian and Alaska Native	40	0.8%
Asian	33	0.7%
Native Hawaiian and Other Pacific Islander	0	0.0%
Some other race	816	16.4%
Two or more races	1,004	20.2%
Hispanic or Latino (of any race)	2,268	45.6%

=== 2000 census ===
As of the census of 2000, 5,105 people, 1,639 households, and 1,125 families resided in the city. The population density was 991.9 inhabitants per square mile (383.0/km^{2}). The 1,852 housing units averaged 359.9 per square mile (138.8/km^{2}). The racial makeup of the city was 65.99% White, 13.26% African American, 0.51% Native American, 0.57% Asian, 16.47% from other races, and 3.19% from two or more races. Hispanics or Latinos of any race were 34.73% of the population.

Of the 1,639 households, 38.1% had children under 18 living with them, 52.8% were married couples living together, 11.4% had a female householder with no husband present, and 31.3% were not families. About 27.6% of all households were made up of individuals, and 13.5% had someone living alone who was 65 or older. The average household size was 2.74, and the average family size was 3.39.

In the city, the age distribution was 31.3% under 18, 13.5% from 18 to 24, 24.7% from 25 to 44, 15.7% from 45 to 64, and 14.9% who were 65 or older. The median age was 29 years. For every 100 females, there were 108.4 males. For every 100 females 18 and over, there were 98.7 males.

The median income for a household in the city was $31,046, and for a family was $37,115. Males had a median income of $27,370 versus $21,706 for females. The per capita income for the city was $14,768. About 13.8% of families and 15.3% of the population were below the poverty line, including 20.5% of those under 18 and 12.0% of those 65 or over.

== Economy ==
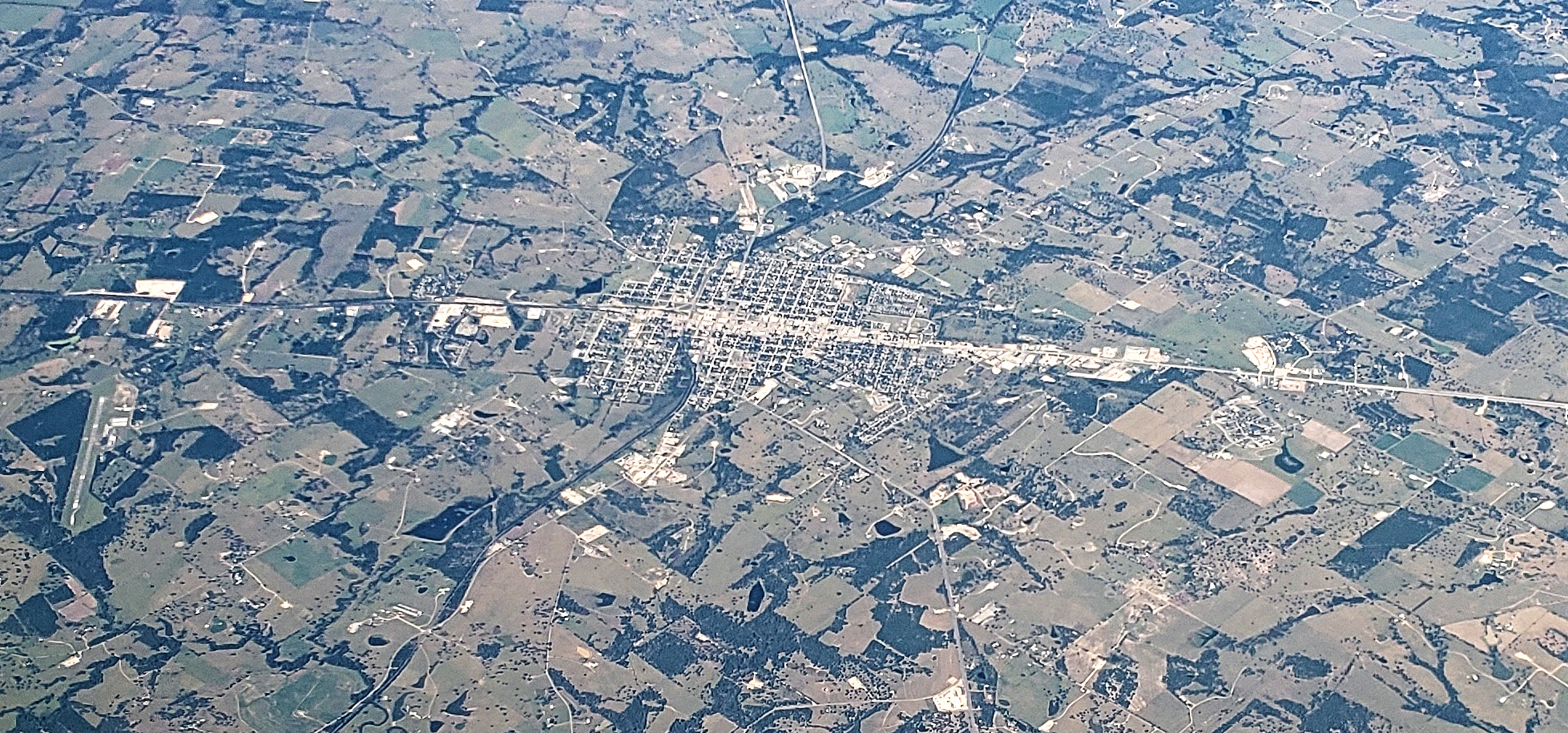
Aerial photo of Giddings, Texas

Major employers include:

- Altman Plants, which operates 70 acres of greenhouses.
- Kaemark, a manufacturer of salon furnishings with headquarters in Giddings.
- Giddings State School is a juvenile correctional facility of the Texas Juvenile Justice Department located in unincorporated Lee County, Texas, near Giddings.
- The Giddings Seed Laboratory, a project of the Texas Department of Agriculture, located in Giddings.
- In 2014, the Giddings Economic Development Corporation purchased 165 acres of land for the development of the Giddings 290 Business Park.

== Education ==
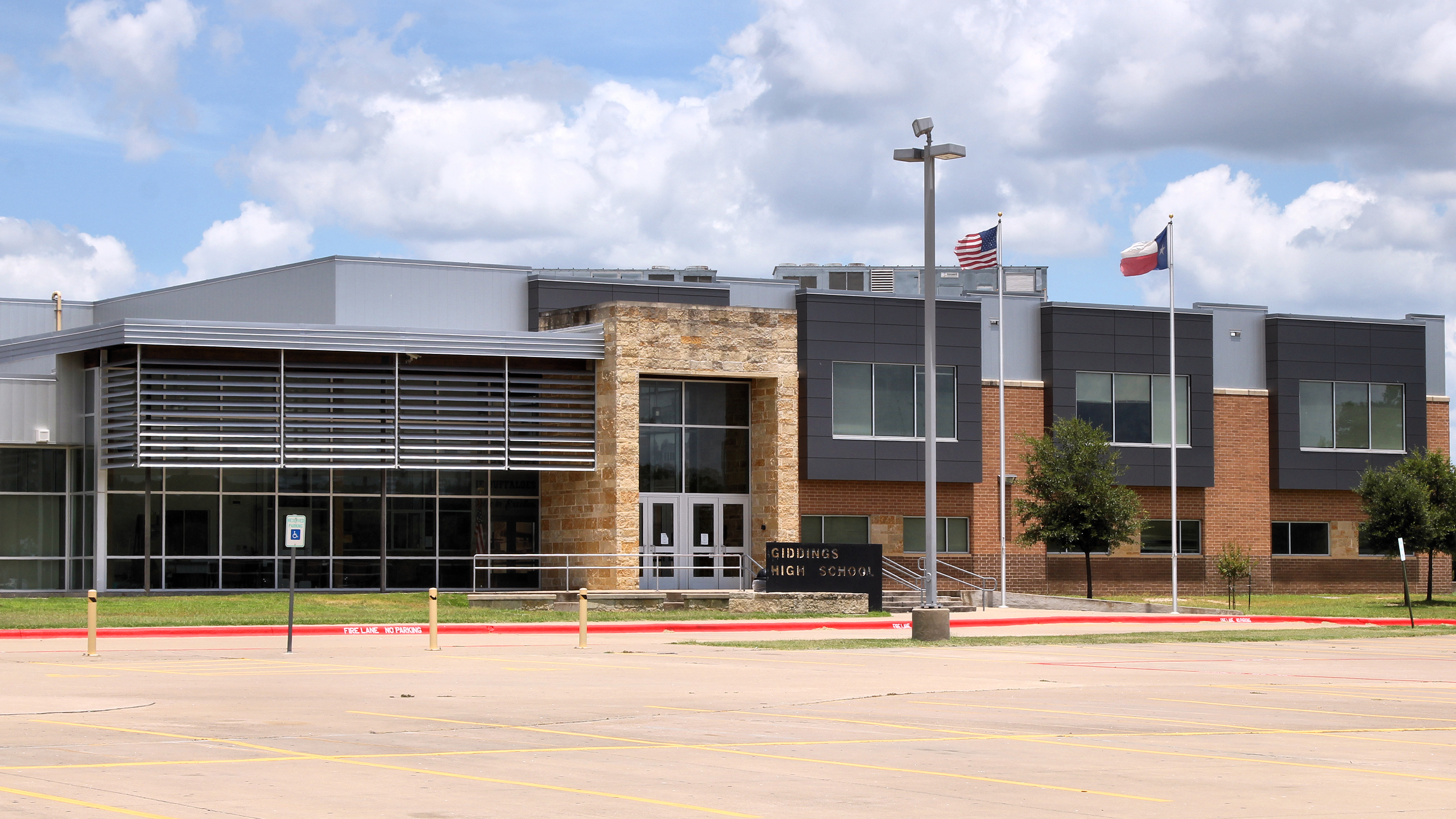
Giddings High School

The City of Giddings is served by the Giddings Independent School District. Giddings High School is a 9th–12th grade campus located in the city. The campus is a member of District 13-AAAA Div.2 with an enrollment of 657 students.

The Texas Legislature designates most of Lee County (Giddings included) as being in the Blinn Junior College district.

== Media ==
Local newspapers serving Giddings and Lee County at large are presently the Giddings Times and News and the Lexington Leader.

A local radio station, KGID, Inc. FM 96.3, has operated since 2018.

The Giddings Deutsches Volksblatt, a trilingual German-English-Wendish/Sorbian newspaper, was published in Giddings.

== Arts and culture ==
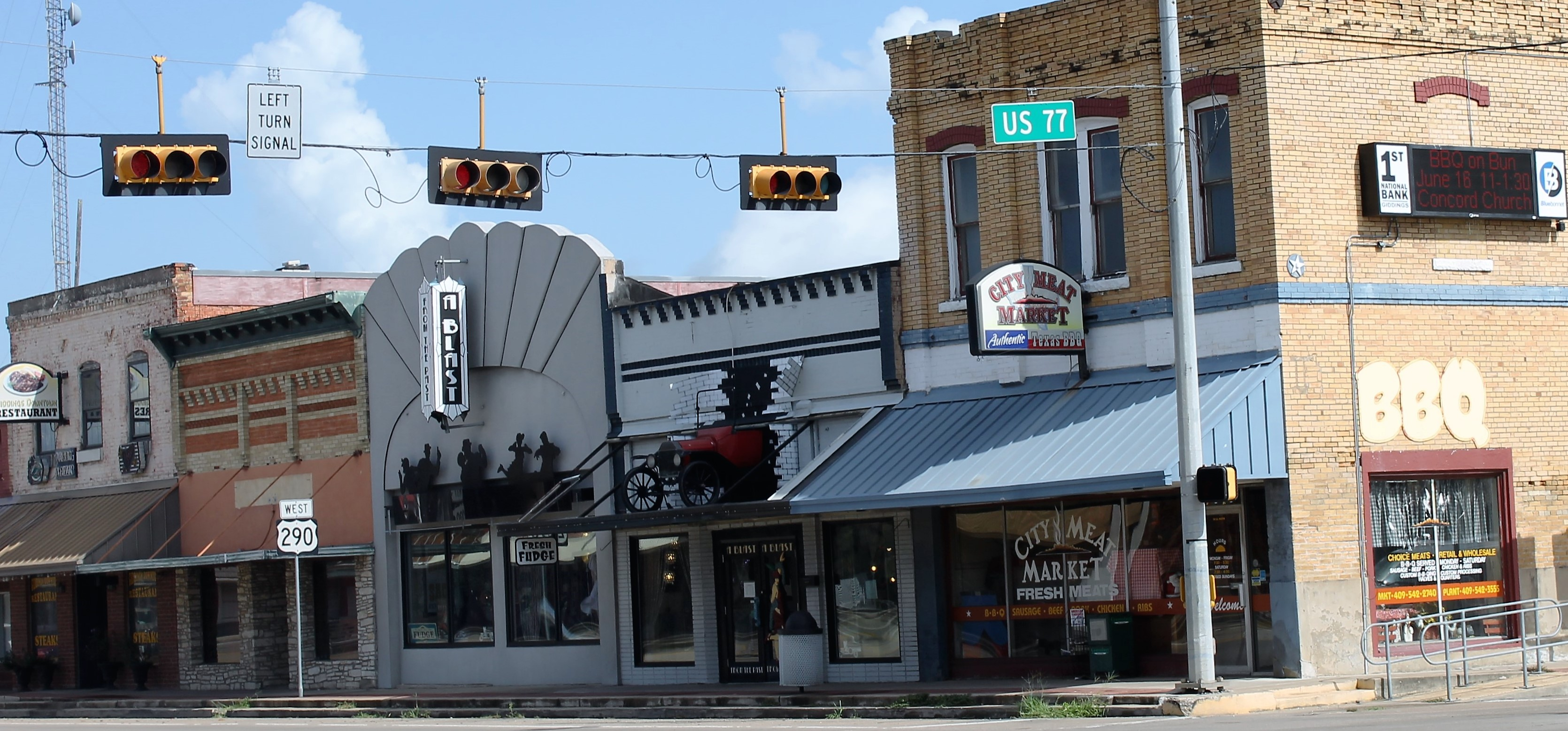
Giddings at the intersection of U.S. Highways 290 and 77

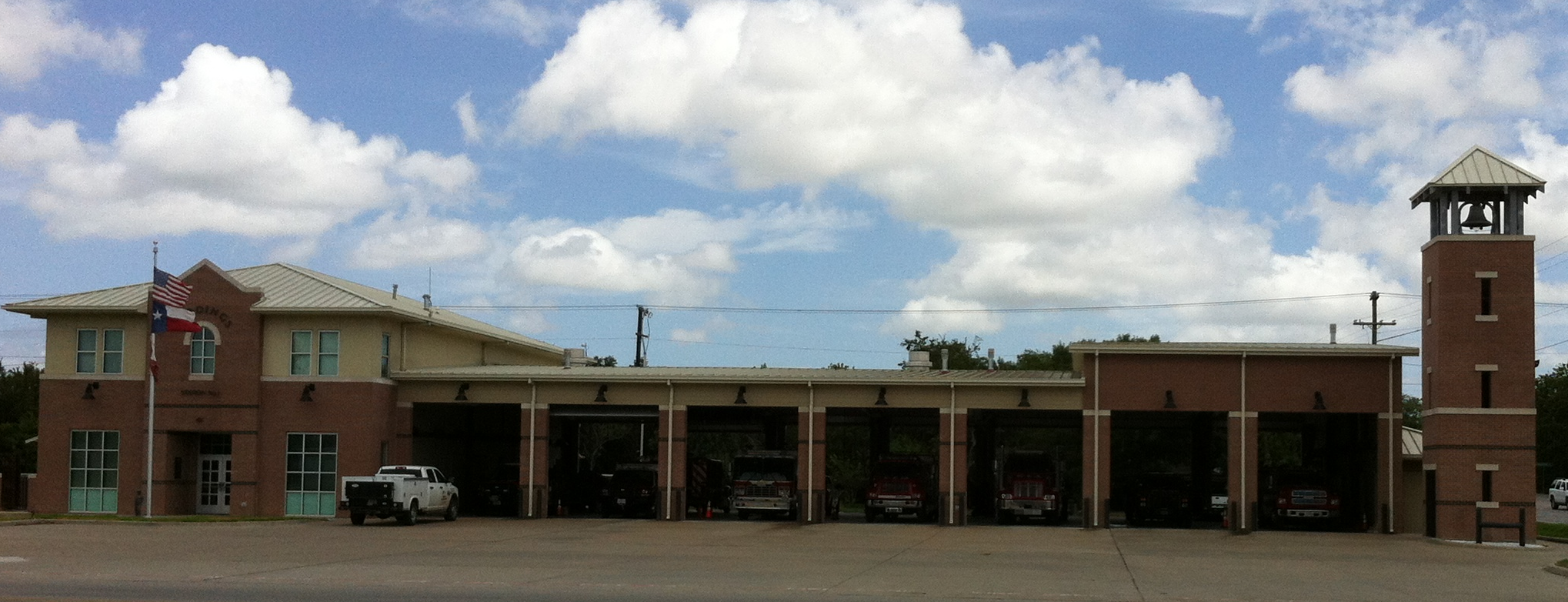
Fire department

In 2015, the city of Giddings, the GEDC, and members of the American Legion launched phase I of the Veterans Memorial Wall Project. The Lee County Veterans Association was created to manage and conduct fundraising for the project, which broke ground in spring 2020.

The Wendish heritage in Giddings is celebrated annually in nearby Serbin, Texas, put on by the Texas Wendish Heritage Society. It occurs on the fourth Sunday every September.

The Giddings Area Chamber of Commerce operates the Lee County Heritage Center/Hubert-Fletcher Home.

The City Meat Market restaurant at the corner of Austin and Main Streets was rated one of the 50 best places for barbecue by Texas Monthly.

In 2017, Texas Monthly selected Snow's BBQ as Best BBQ in Texas, thereby elevating female pitmaster Tootsie Tomanetz to regional celebrity status one week before her 85th birthday. The business was previously honored with this award in 2008. Tomanetz is slated to appear in the Netflix documentary Chef's Table.

The Historic Freight Station and Depot Complex is located in downtown Giddings. Property owner GEDC has leased one of the freight stations to a distillery for use as a tasting room and bottling operation and another building for use as a brewhouse (Brauerei) and German restaurant, currently under development.

== Notable people ==
- Gwendolyn B. Bennett, writer and journalist, major Harlem Renaissance figure
- Gus Mutscher, former speaker of the Texas House of Representatives
- David J. Porter (born 1956), Texas railroad commissioner
- Hilton Smith, pitcher in Negro League baseball
- Larry Wade, world-class 110 hurdler and NCAA champion in 110 hurdles (Texas A&M University)
