= Oldenburg, Texas =

Unincorporated community in Texas, US

Coordinates: 29°58′36″N 96°45′54″W

Oldenburg is an unincorporated community in northeastern Fayette County, Texas, United States.

The community was named after the Oldenburg state in Germany.
