= Carmine, Texas =

- City
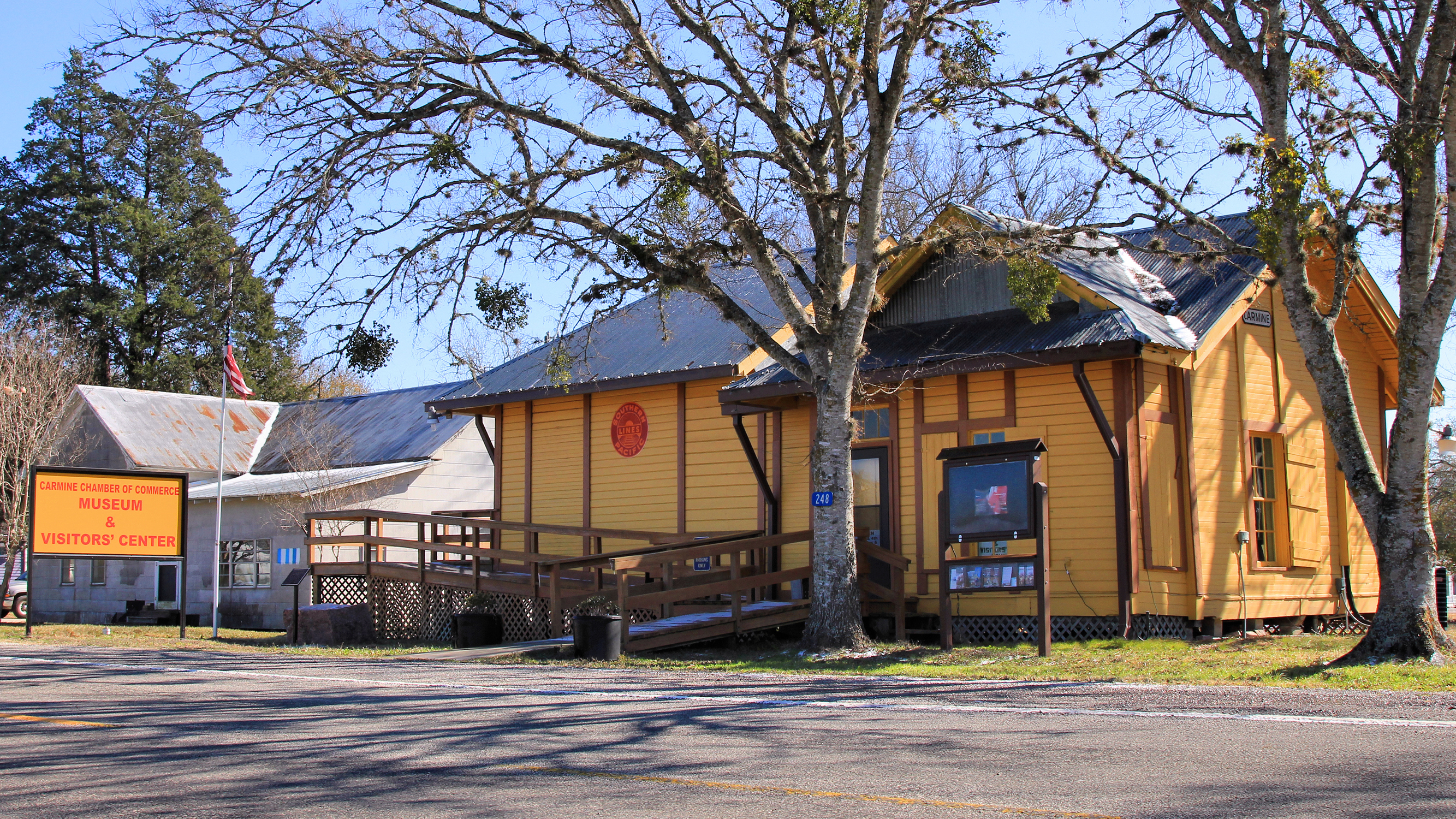
- Carmine Chamber of Commerce Museum and Visitor Center

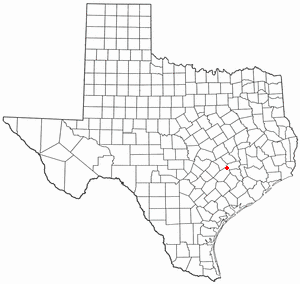
- Location of Carmine, Texas

- Coordinates: 30°08′55″N 96°41′26″W
- Country: United States
- State: Texas
- County: Fayette

Area
  - Total: 1.64 sq mi (4.24 km^{2})
  - Land: 1.64 sq mi (4.24 km^{2})
  - Water: 0 sq mi (0.00 km^{2})
- Elevation: 423 ft (129 m)

Population (2020)
  - Total: 244
  - Estimate (2023): 248
  - Density: 149/sq mi (57.5/km^{2})
- Time zone: UTC-6 (Central (CST))
  - Summer (DST): UTC-5 (CDT)
- ZIP code: 78932
- Area code: 979
- FIPS code: 48-12916
- GNIS feature ID: 2409988
- Website: cityofcarmine.com

Carmine (/ˈkɑːrmiːn/ KAR-meen) is a city in Fayette County, Texas, United States. The population was 244 at the 2020 census.

The Texas Basketball Museum in Carmine is operated by Coach Bob Springer at the corner of Augsburg Avenue and Hauptstrasse Street. The collection highlights players who advance to the professional ranks as well as high school teams of notable achievement.

== Geography ==
Carmine is located at the northern end of Fayette County. It is bordered to the northeast by Washington County. U.S. Route 290, a four-lane divided highway, passes through the center of Carmine, leading east 18 miles (29 km) to Brenham and west 15 miles (24 km) to Giddings. Houston is 91 miles (146 km) to the east on US 290, and Austin is 70 miles (110 km) to the west.

According to the United States Census Bureau, Carmine has a total area of 1.6 square miles (4.2 km^{2}), all land.

== Climate ==
Climate data for Muldoon, Texas
Month	Jan	Feb	Mar	Apr	May	Jun	Jul	Aug	Sep	Oct	Nov	Dec	Year
Record high °F (°C)	86 (30)	87 (31)	89 (32)	92 (33)	95 (35)	99 (37)	100 (38)	107 (42)	102 (39)	100 (38)	93 (34)	85 (29)	107 (42)
Mean daily maximum °F (°C)	51 (11)	62 (17)	66 (19)	72 (22)	78 (26)	87 (31)	92 (33)	94 (34)	92 (33)	81 (27)	63 (17)	48 (9)	74 (23)
Mean daily minimum °F (°C)	38 (3)	44 (7)	53 (12)	67 (19)	72 (22)	71 (22)	72 (22)	74 (23)	72 (22)	64 (18)	56 (13)	32 (0)	60 (15)
Record low °F (°C)	1 (−17)	12 (−11)	14 (−10)	31 (−1)	42 (6)	50 (10)	56 (13)	54 (12)	47 (8)	22 (−6)	10 (−12)	3 (−16)	3 (−16)
Average precipitation inches (mm)	1.10 (28)	5.60 (142)	4.16 (106)	2.25 (57)	6.38 (162)	2.46 (62)	0.41 (10)	0.25 (6.4)	1.83 (46)	2.22 (56)	2.10 (53)	9.60 (244)	62.59 (1,590)
Source: weather.com

== Demographics ==
Historical population
Census	Pop.	Note	%±
1980	239		—
1990	192		−19.7%
2000	228		18.8%
2010	250		9.6%
2020	244		−2.4%
U.S. Decennial Census; 2020 Census

=== 2020 census ===
As of the 2020 census, Carmine had a population of 244. The median age was 52.0 years. 20.9% of residents were under the age of 18 and 33.2% of residents were 65 years of age or older. For every 100 females there were 82.1 males, and for every 100 females age 18 and over there were 80.4 males age 18 and over.

0% of residents lived in urban areas, while 100.0% lived in rural areas.

There were 104 households in Carmine, of which 28.8% had children under the age of 18 living in them. Of all households, 55.8% were married-couple households, 9.6% were households with a male householder and no spouse or partner present, and 33.7% were households with a female householder and no spouse or partner present. About 26.0% of all households were made up of individuals and 12.5% had someone living alone who was 65 years of age or older.

There were 141 housing units, of which 26.2% were vacant. Among occupied housing units, 76.9% were owner-occupied and 23.1% were renter-occupied. The homeowner vacancy rate was 2.3% and the rental vacancy rate was 13.3%.

Racial composition as of the 2020 census
Race	Percent
White	85.2%
Black or African American	2.0%
American Indian and Alaska Native	1.2%
Asian	0%
Native Hawaiian and Other Pacific Islander	0%
Some other race	4.1%
Two or more races	7.4%
Hispanic or Latino (of any race)	10.2%

=== 2000 census ===
As of the census of 2000, there were 228 people, 91 households, and 60 families residing in the city. The population density was 138.4 inhabitants per square mile (53.4/km^{2}). There were 118 housing units at an average density of 71.6 per square mile (27.6/km^{2}). The racial makeup of the city was 90.35% White, 1.75% African American, 0.44% Native American, 6.14% from other races, and 1.32% from two or more races. Hispanic or Latino of any race were 11.40% of the population.

There were 91 households, out of which 26.4% had children under the age of 18 living with them, 62.6% were married couples living together, 4.4% had a female householder with no husband present, and 33.0% were non-families. 31.9% of all households were made up of individuals, and 20.9% had someone living alone who was 65 years of age or older. The average household size was 2.40 and the average family size was 3.07.

In the city, the population was spread out, with 23.2% under the age of 18, 7.9% from 18 to 24, 22.4% from 25 to 44, 24.6% from 45 to 64, and 21.9% who were 65 years of age or older. The median age was 43 years. For every 100 females, there were 78.1 males. For every 100 females age 18 and over, there were 80.4 males.

The median income for a household in the city was $27,396, and the median income for a family was $49,375. Males had a median income of $30,625 versus $29,063 for females. The per capita income for the city was $34,614. About 15.1% of families and 14.7% of the population were below the poverty line, including 16.7% of those under the age of eighteen and 18.9% of those 65 or over.

== Education ==
Carmine is served by the Round Top-Carmine Independent School District.
