= National Register of Historic Places listings in Fayette County, Texas =

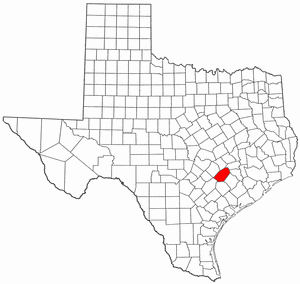
Location of Fayette County in Texas

This is a list of the National Register of Historic Places listings in Fayette County, Texas.

This is intended to be a complete list of properties and districts listed on the National Register of Historic Places in Fayette County, Texas. There are four districts and 19 individual properties listed on the National Register in the county. The individually listed properties include one State Historic Site, five State Antiquities Landmarks, and seven Recorded Texas Historic Landmarks. Three districts together include numerous additional Recorded Texas Historic Landmarks. Three properties were formerly listed on the National Register including one that has since been relisted after relocation.

This National Park Service list is complete through NPS recent listings posted September 11, 2026.

== Current listings ==
The locations of National Register properties and districts may be seen in a mapping service provided.

	Name on the Register	Image	Date listed	Location	City or town	Description
1	Bedstead Truss Bridge	Bedstead Truss Bridge	November 29, 2013 (#13000888)	0.1 mi. NW. of jct. of Hillje & Kallus Sts. 29°40′27″N 96°54′39″W	Schulenburg	State Antiquities Landmark, Recorded Texas Historic Landmark; formerly the Mulberry Creek Bridge, originally listed on the National Register in 1975 (listing number 75001976), removed in May 2013 due to relocation.
2	Bethlehem Lutheran Church	Bethlehem Lutheran Church	August 10, 1978 (#78002928)	White St. 30°03′46″N 96°41′58″W	Round Top	Recorded Texas Historic Landmark
3	Cummins Creek Bridge	Cummins Creek Bridge	April 21, 1975 (#75001975)	2 mi (3.2 km). NW of Round Top over Cummins Creek; 30°04′07″N 96°43′09″W	Round Top vicinity	State Antiquities Landmark; replaced in 1996
4	Dubina Historic District	Dubina Historic District	September 27, 2003 (#03000970)	Roughly bounded by FM 1383 and Cty Rd. 480; 29°43′44″N 96°50′08″W	Dubina	
5	East Navidad River Bridge	East Navidad River Bridge	August 18, 2014 (#14000497)	FM 1579 at East Navidad River; 29°40′59″N 96°50′47″W	Schulenburg vicinity	
6	Nathaniel W. Faison House	Nathaniel W. Faison House	March 11, 2010 (#08000538)	822 S. Jefferson; 29°53′57″N 96°52′22″W	La Grange	Recorded Texas Historic Landmark
7	Fayette County Courthouse and Jail	Fayette County Courthouse and Jail	January 23, 1975 (#75001973)	Courthouse Sq. and 104 Main St. 29°54′19″N 96°52′43″W	La Grange	State Antiquities Landmark, includes Recorded Texas Historic Landmark; part of Fayette County Courthouse Square Historic District
8	Fayette County Courthouse Square Historic District	Fayette County Courthouse Square Historic District	January 16, 2001 (#00001664)	Roughly bounded by Main, Lafayette, Franklin, Colorado, Jefferson, Washington, and Crockett Sts. 29°54′17″N 96°52′39″W	La Grange	Includes Recorded Texas Historic Landmarks
9	Fayetteville Historic District	Fayetteville Historic District	July 10, 2008 (#08000657)	Roughly bounded by E. Bell, N. Thompson (FM 1291), E. Fayette, E. Main (SH 159), Post Oak Lane, 29°54′26″N 96°40′26″W	Fayetteville	Includes Recorded Texas Historic Landmarks
10	Flatonia Historic District	Flatonia Historic District	June 26, 2017 (#100001223)	Roughly bounded by N. Main, 7th, Middle, Market, 6th, Penn, S. Main & Faires Sts. 29°41′15″N 97°06′31″W	Flatonia	Includes Recorded Texas Historic Landmarks
11	Mier Expedition and Dawson's Men Monument and Tomb	Mier Expedition and Dawson's Men Monument and Tomb	March 6, 2019 (#100003486)	414 TX Loop 92, Monument Hill and Kreische Brewery State Historic Sites. 29°53′20″N 96°52′37″W	La Grange vicinity	State Historic Site, State Antiquities Landmark
12	Henry L. Kreische Brewery and House	Henry L. Kreische Brewery and House	April 16, 1975 (#75001974)	S of La Grange off U.S. 77 on Monument Hill; 29°53′23″N 96°52′29″W	La Grange vicinity	State Historic Site, State Antiquities Landmark
13	Nativity of Mary, Blessed Virgin Catholic Church	Nativity of Mary, Blessed Virgin Catholic Church	June 21, 1983 (#83003136)	FM 2672; 29°43′03″N 96°55′40″W	High Hill	
14	William Neese Sr. Homestead	William Neese Sr. Homestead	February 18, 1975 (#75001977)	On TX 237; 30°01′06″N 96°43′54″W	Warrenton	
15	Sengelmann Hall and City Meat Market Building	Sengelmann Hall and City Meat Market Building	June 18, 2009 (#09000451)	527 and 529-533 N. Main St. 29°40′47″N 96°54′19″W	Schulenburg	
16	Simon Pytlovany House		April 14, 1975 (#75001972)	1.5 mi (2.4 km). S of Dubina on FR 1383; 29°42′45″N 96°50′20″W	Dubina	About .4 mile off the road on private property and obscured by trees.
17	Schulenburg Cotton Compress	Schulenburg Cotton Compress	September 13, 1979 (#79002938)	James and Main Sts. 29°40′43″N 96°54′45″W	Schulenburg	
18	St. James Episcopal Church	St. James Episcopal Church	June 18, 1976 (#76002026)	Monroe and Colorado Sts. 29°54′29″N 96°52′25″W	La Grange	Recorded Texas Historic Landmark
19	St. John the Baptist Catholic Church	St. John the Baptist Catholic Church	June 21, 1983 (#83003137)	FM 1383; 29°47′14″N 96°51′32″W	Ammannsville	
20	St. Mary's Church of the Assumption	St. Mary's Church of the Assumption	June 21, 1983 (#83003138)	FM 1295; 29°40′11″N 97°04′00″W	Praha	
21	State Highway 71 Bridge at the Colorado River	State Highway 71 Bridge at the Colorado River	October 10, 1996 (#96001120)	TX 71, .8 mi E of jct. with FM 609; 29°54′05″N 96°53′12″W	La Grange	
22	Winedale Inn Complex	Winedale Inn Complex	June 22, 1970 (#70000745)	Off FM 1457; 30°05′11″N 96°38′29″W	Winedale	State Antiquities Landmark, includes Recorded Texas Historic Landmark; now a division of The Center for American History, The University of Texas at Austin
23	Zapp Building	Zapp Building	June 23, 1983 (#83003139)	Fayette and Washington Sts. 29°54′15″N 96°40′37″W	Fayetteville	Recorded Texas Historic Landmark; part of Fayetteville Historic District; brick two-story Romanesque Revival mercantile building and emporium constructed in 1900.

== Former listings ==
	Name on the Register	Image	Date listed	Date removed	Location	City or town	Description
1	Buckner's Creek Bridge		May 29, 1976 (#76002025)	April 21, 1988	10 mi. N of Flatonia over Buckner's Creek	Flatonia	State Antiquities Landmark; demolished in 1988
2	Mount Eliza		July 17, 1978 (#78002927)	August 30, 1994	Three miles south of LaGrange on US Highway 77	LaGrange	Relocated in 1988.

== See also ==
- National Register of Historic Places listings in Texas
- List of Texas State Historic Sites
- Recorded Texas Historic Landmarks in Fayette County
