= St. John the Baptist Catholic Church (Ammannsville, Texas) =

Historic church in Texas, United States

- U.S. National Register of Historic Places
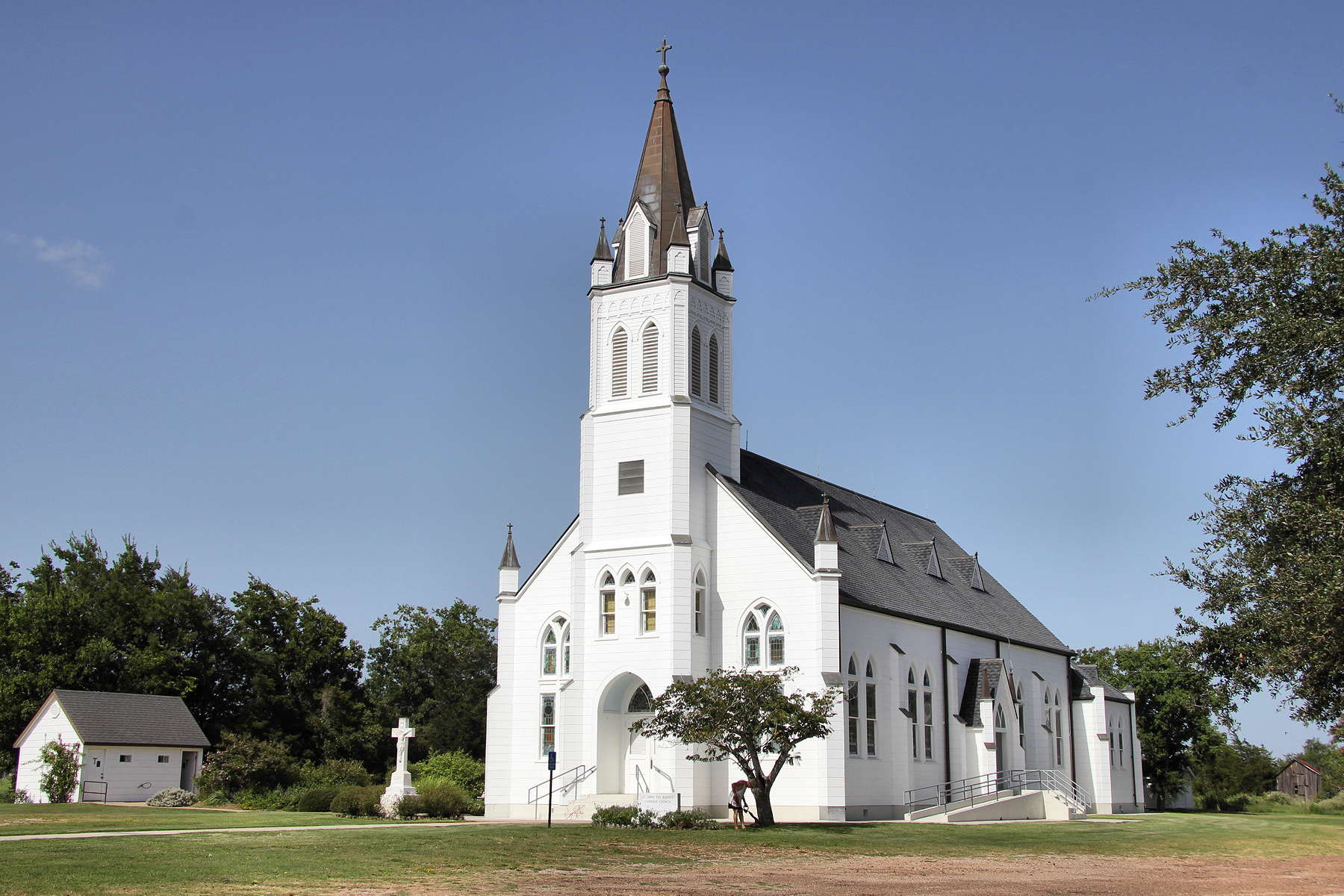
- St. John the Baptist Church in 2012

- Location within Texas Location within the United States
- Location: FM 1383, Ammannsville, Texas
- Coordinates: 29°47′12″N 96°51′30″W
- Area: less than one acre
- Built: 1917
- Architect: John F. Bujnoch
- Architectural style: Gothic Revival, Carpenter Gothic
- MPS: Churches with Decorative Interior Painting TR
- NRHP reference No.: 83003137
- Added to NRHP: June 21, 1983

St. John the Baptist Catholic Church is a historic church on FM 1383 in Ammannsville, Texas. It was built in 1917 and added to the National Register of Historic Places in 1983.

== See also ==
- National Register of Historic Places listings in Fayette County, Texas
