= Leo M. J. Dielmann =

American architect

Leo M.J. Dielmann
- Born: Leo Maria Joseph Dielmann; August 14, 1881; San Antonio, Texas, US
- Died: December 21, 1969 (aged 88); San Antonio, Texas, US
- Occupation: Architect

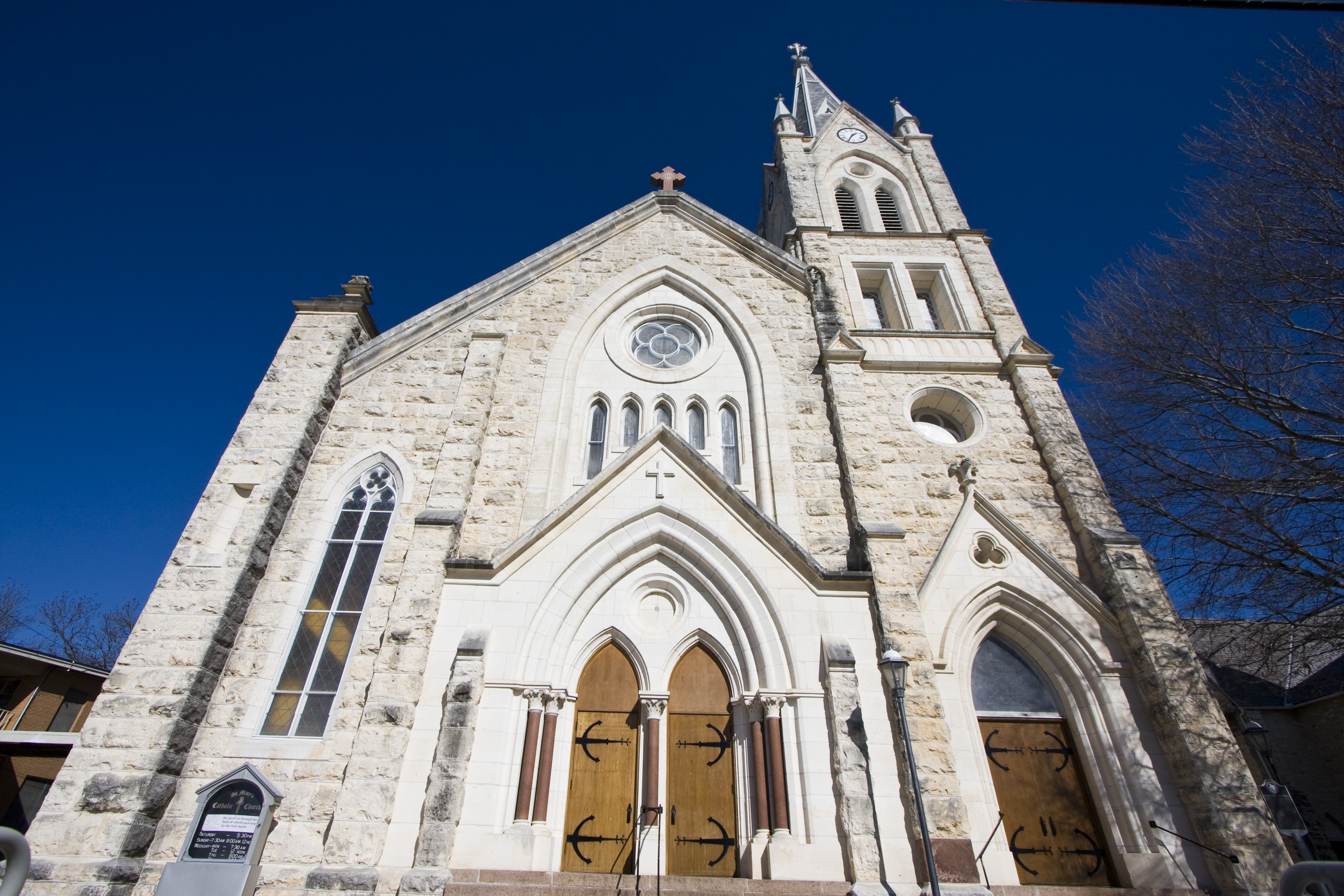
St. Mary's Catholic Church (Fredericksburg, Texas)

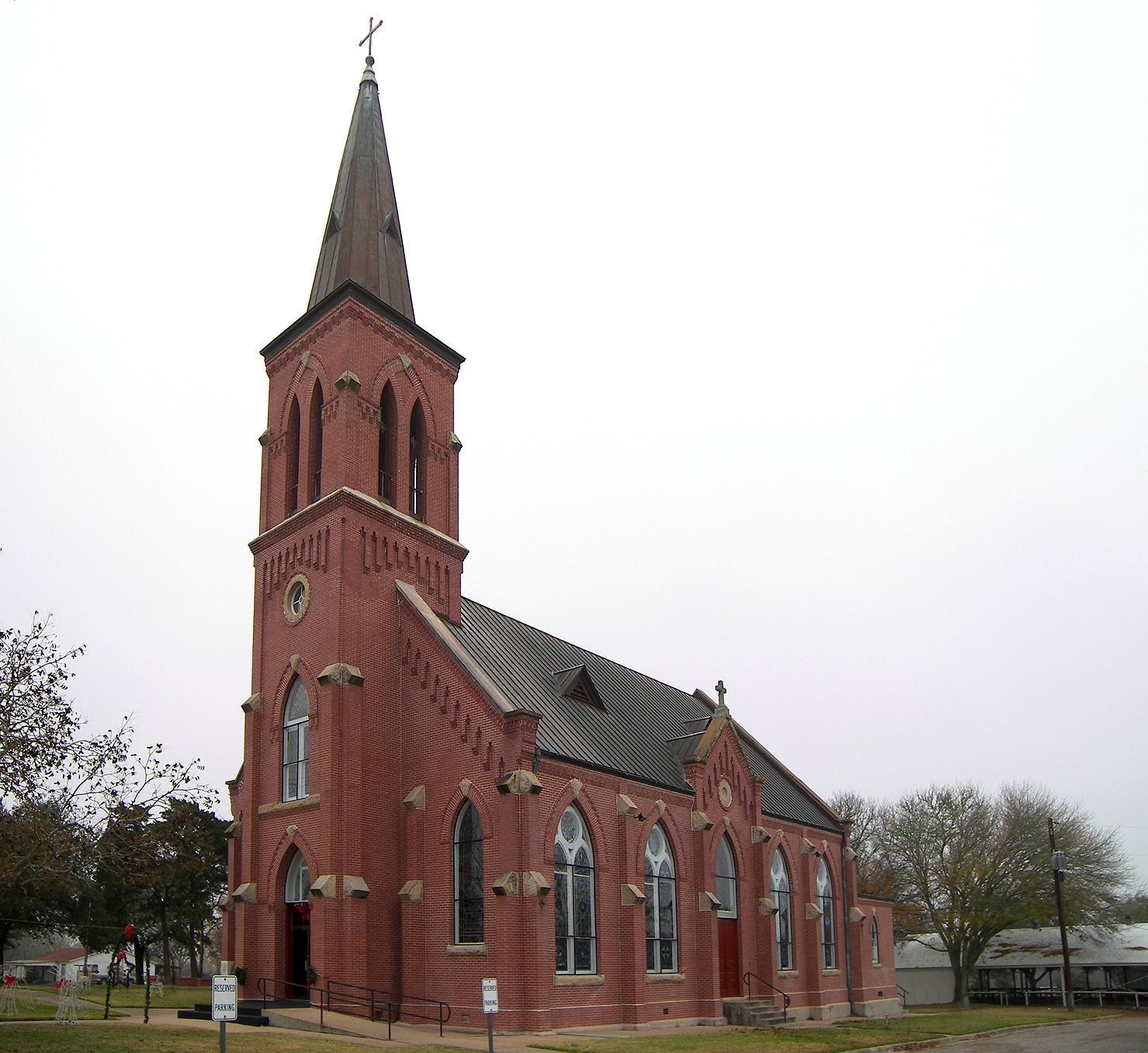
Nativity of Mary, Blessed Virgin Catholic Church High Hill, Texas

Leo Maria Joseph Dielmann (August 14, 1881 – December 21, 1969) was a prominent and prolific architect in Texas. He designed over 100 churches, with several of them, along with other buildings, now listed on the U.S. National Register of Historic Places.

Dielmann was born in San Antonio, Texas to John C. Dielmann, a German immigrant, and Maria (Gros) Dielmann, the daughter of immigrants. His father was a stonemason who joined a construction and supply business, Pauly and Dielmann. An active Catholic layman, he was elected the first president of the St. Joseph's Society of St. Joseph's R.C. Church and then served as first president of the Deutsch Roemisch Katholischer Staatsverband von Texas (the Catholic State League of Texas).

Leo M.J. Dielmann graduated from St Mary's College in San Antonio in 1898. Afterwards he studied architecture and engineering in Germany from about 1899 to 1901, including a visit to the Exposition Universelle (1900) in Paris that showcased Art Nouveau in art and architecture. He returned to spend three years in his father's business, before setting up his own practice.

Like his father, Dielmann was a leading Catholic layman, as a member of the St. Joseph's Society of St. Joseph's R.C. Church, the Knights of Columbus, Order of Alhambra, San Antonio Liederkranz, the Beethoven Männerchor, and as president of the Harmonia Lodge of the Sons of Hermann. He also served as a city council member in San Antonio in 1913 and 1914, and was a long-time member of the San Antonio Public Library board of Trustees.

In 1926, Deilmann completed Our Lady of Guadalupe Catholic Church on San Antonio's West Side to serve its Mexican-American population. The red brick building is Romanesque, with strong elements of the Lombardy style.

Dielmann's work included more than 100 church buildings from Houston to Marshall to Amarillo, but mostly across South Texas, as well as hundreds of commercial buildings, hotels, schools, and houses. His 12-story Frost Bank Building erected in 1922 was restored in 1994 to become the Municipal Plaza Building, housing the City Council chambers and city offices.

Dielmann married Ella Marie Wagner, a daughter of German emigres, on April 25, 1911, and they had three children. He died on December 21, 1969, at the age of eighty-eight.

Notable works include:

- The Fairmount Hotel, 401 S. Alamo San Antonio, Texas, NRHP-listed
- Conventual Chapel at Our Lady of the Lake University, 411 S.W. 24th St., San Antonio, Texas, Gothic Revival style, built 1923
- LaBorde House, Store and Hotel, 601 E. Main St., Rio Grande City, Texas, NRHP-listed
- Monastery of Our Lady of Charity, 1900 Montana, San Antonio, Texas, Italianate and Gothic architecture, NRHP-listed
- Nativity of Mary, Blessed Virgin Catholic Church, FM 2672, High Hill, Texas, built 1906, NRHP-listed
- Our Lady of Lourdes Church, 105 N. William St., Victoria, Texas, Romanesque Revival style, NRHP-listed
- Park Hotel, known as the Plaza Hotel since 1919, 217 S. River St., Seguin, Texas, NRHP-listed, opened 1917
- Post Chapel (Fort Sam Houston), Bldg. 2200, Wilson St., San Antonio, Texas, NRHP-listed
- Sacred Heart Catholic Church, 1633 S. Eighth St. Abilene, Texas, NRHP-listed
- St. Mary's Catholic Church, 306 W. San Antonio St., Fredericksburg, Texas, gothic-inspired native stone structure, NRHP-listed
- St. Mary's Catholic Church, 701 Church St., Brenham, Texas, built 1935, NRHP-listed
- St. James Catholic Church, 507 S. Camp St., Seguin, Texas, Gothic Revival style in red brick, built 1914
- Hermann Sons Grand Lodge, 515 S. St. Mary's St., San Antonio, Art Deco style, built in 1938
- The Barr Building, 213–19 Broadway, San Antonio, Texas, built in 1912
