= Bethlehem Lutheran Church (Round Top, Texas) =

Historic church in Texas, United States

- U.S. National Register of Historic Places
- Recorded Texas Historic Landmark
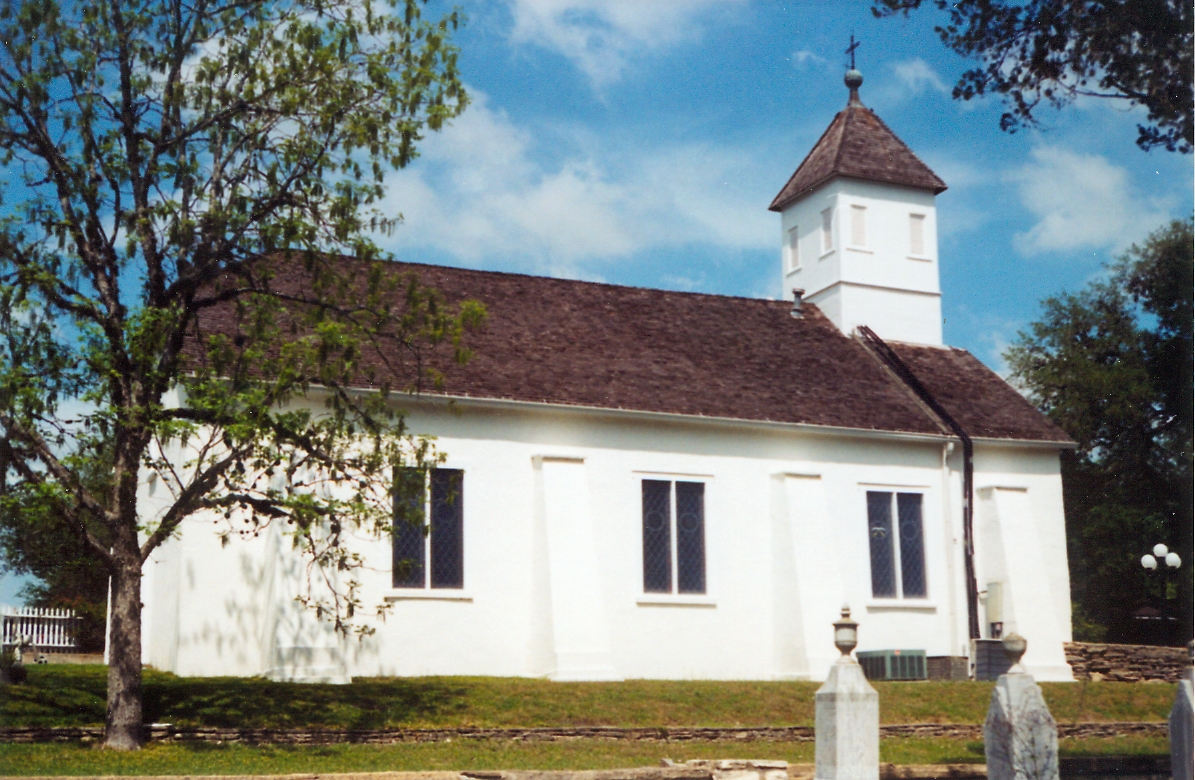
- Bethlehem Lutheran Church

- Location within Texas Location within the United States
- Location: 412 S. White St., Round Top, TX
- Coordinates: 30°03′46″N 96°41′58″W
- Area: 3 acres (1.2 ha)
- Built: 1866
- Mason: Carl Siegismund Bauer
- NRHP reference No.: 78002928

Significant dates
- Added to NRHP: 10 August 1978
- Designated RTHL: 1965

Bethelem Lutheran Church is an historic stone Lutheran church located at 412 South White Street in Round Top, Texas.

== Construction ==
The building was designed by Carl Siegismund Bauer, a German Texan, who also served as the head mason. The church was built from May 6 to October 28, 1866. Bauer's sons and family as well as the local citizens contributed the labor to raise the church. The sandstone was quarried from Cummins Creek bounding the church site on the west. Eastern Red Cedar from the creek bottom were harvested and hand hewn into beams for the framing timber. The side walls are reinforced by iron tie rods across the interior added in 1873 and supported by 4 exterior stone buttresses on the south side.

== Pipe organ ==
A cedar pipe organ built by John Traugott Wantke, also a German Texan, was dedicated on January 13, 1867, the day the congregation was formally organized. The organ made primarily from local cedar was restored in 1966 and 1995 and as of 2016 it remained in use. The organ is one of the most historic in the state, the largest of six organs Wantke built, and one of three surviving as of 1987. The organ received certificate number 56 from the Organ Historical Society on May 24, 1987.

== History ==
It is one of the earliest stone churches built in this section of Texas and has been used for services continuously since its construction in 1866. It is the oldest Lutheran church sanctuary in Texas. The first pastor was J. Adam Neuthard. It was recorded as a Texas Historic Landmark in 1965 and added to the National Register of Historic Places on August 10, 1978. The church celebrated its sesquicentennial on October 23, 2016.

== Photo gallery ==
Photographs of Bethlehem Lutheran Church in Round Top, Texas from 1936, 1972, 2014, 2016 and 2017
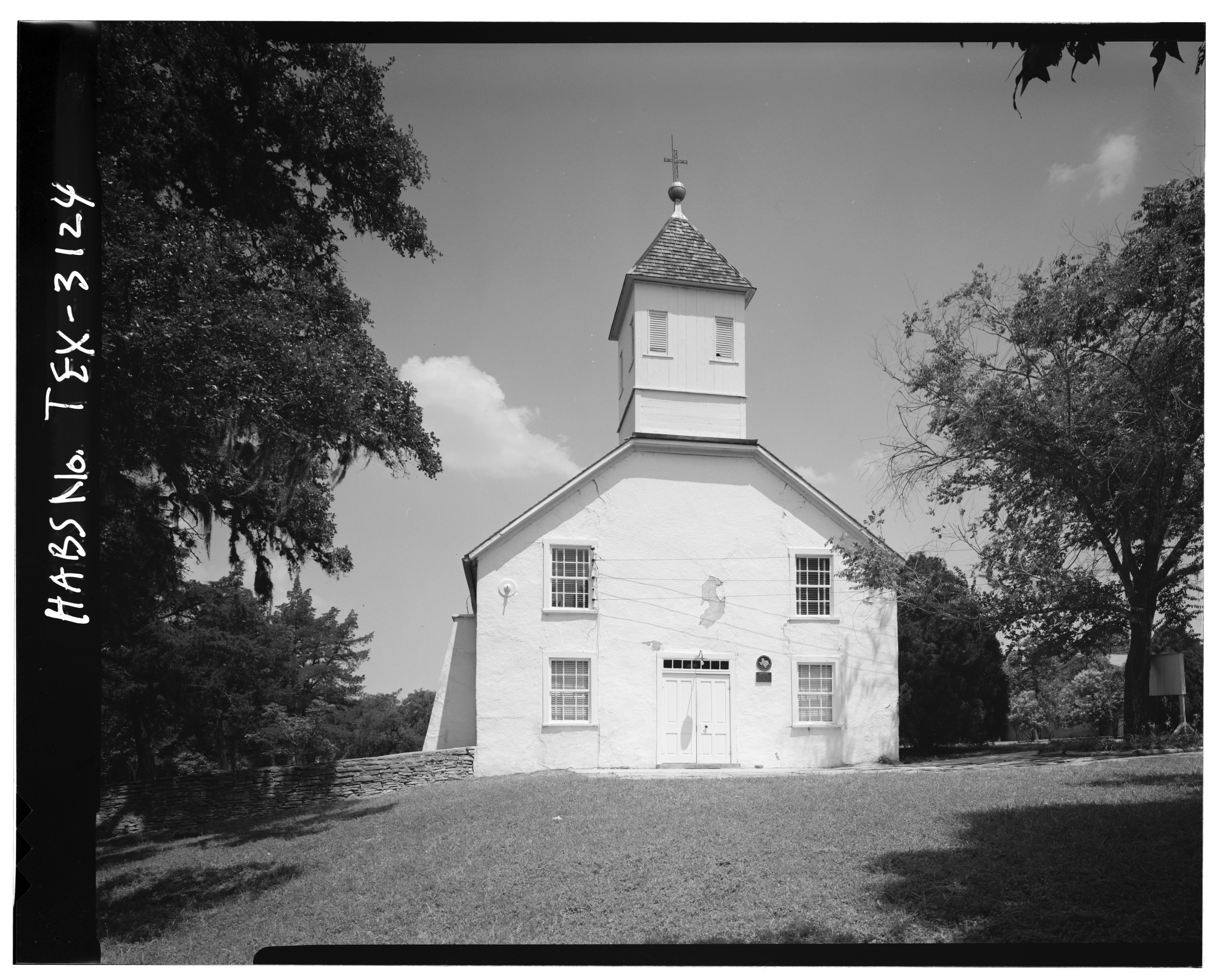
Facade (1972)

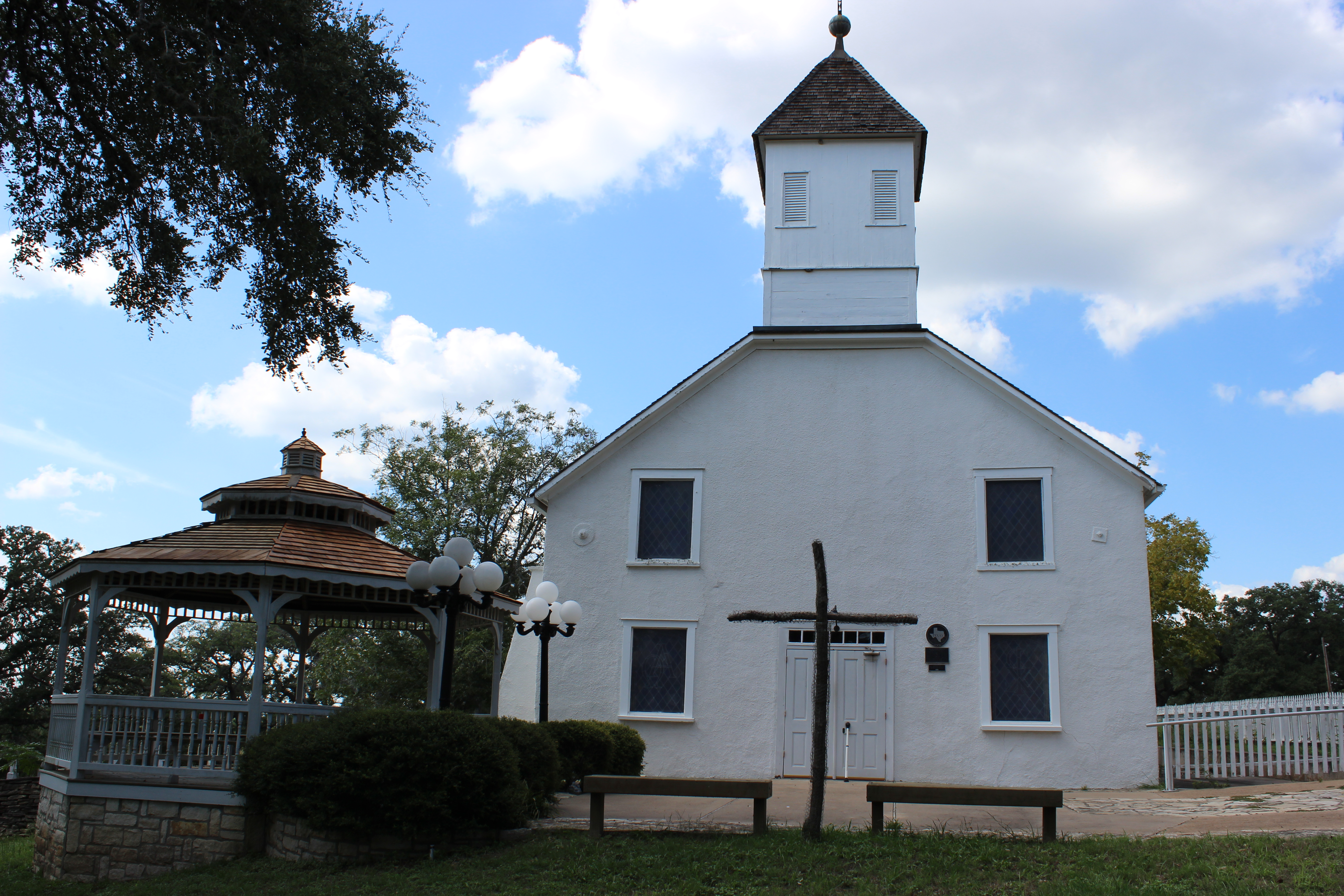
Facade (2014)

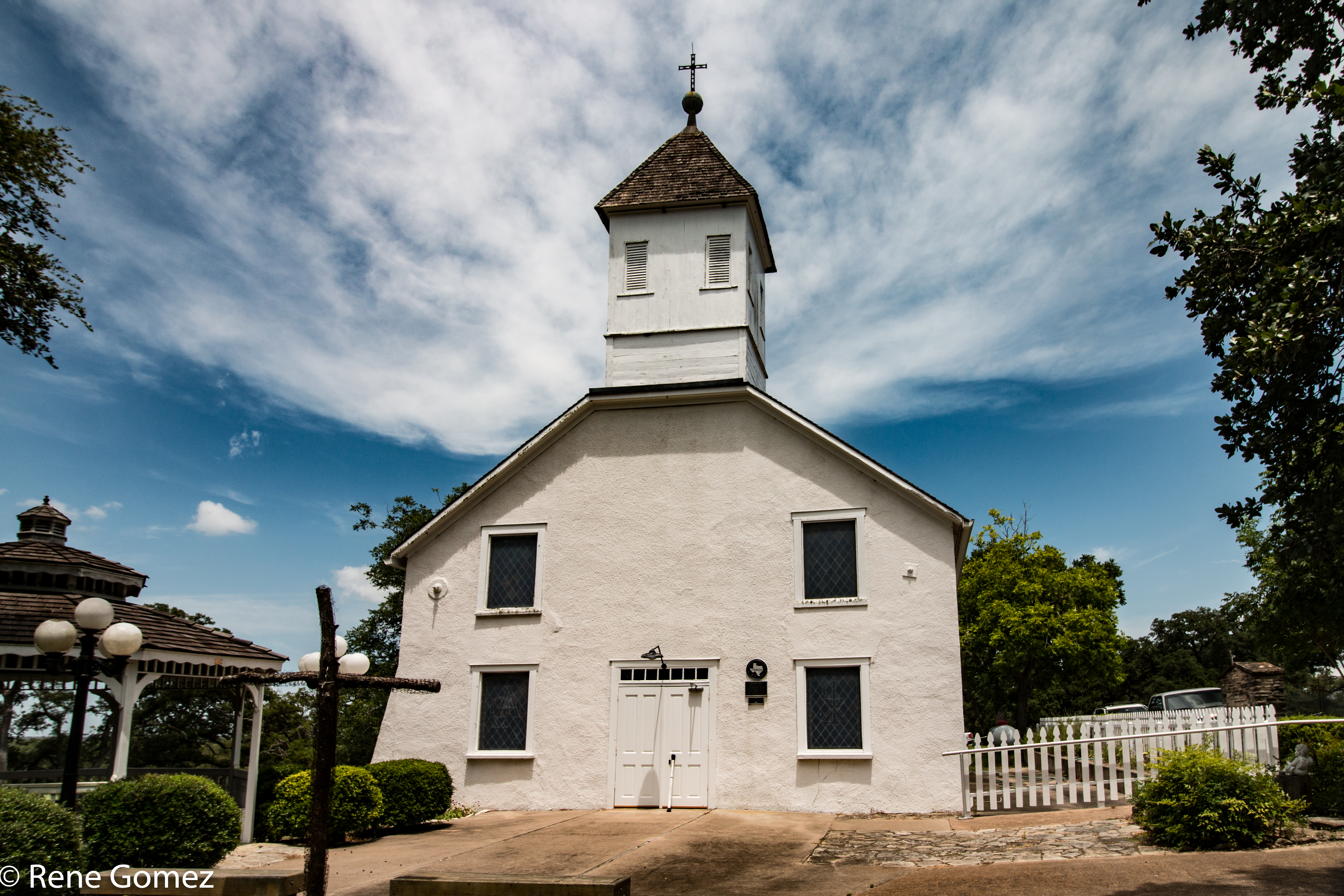
Facade (2017)

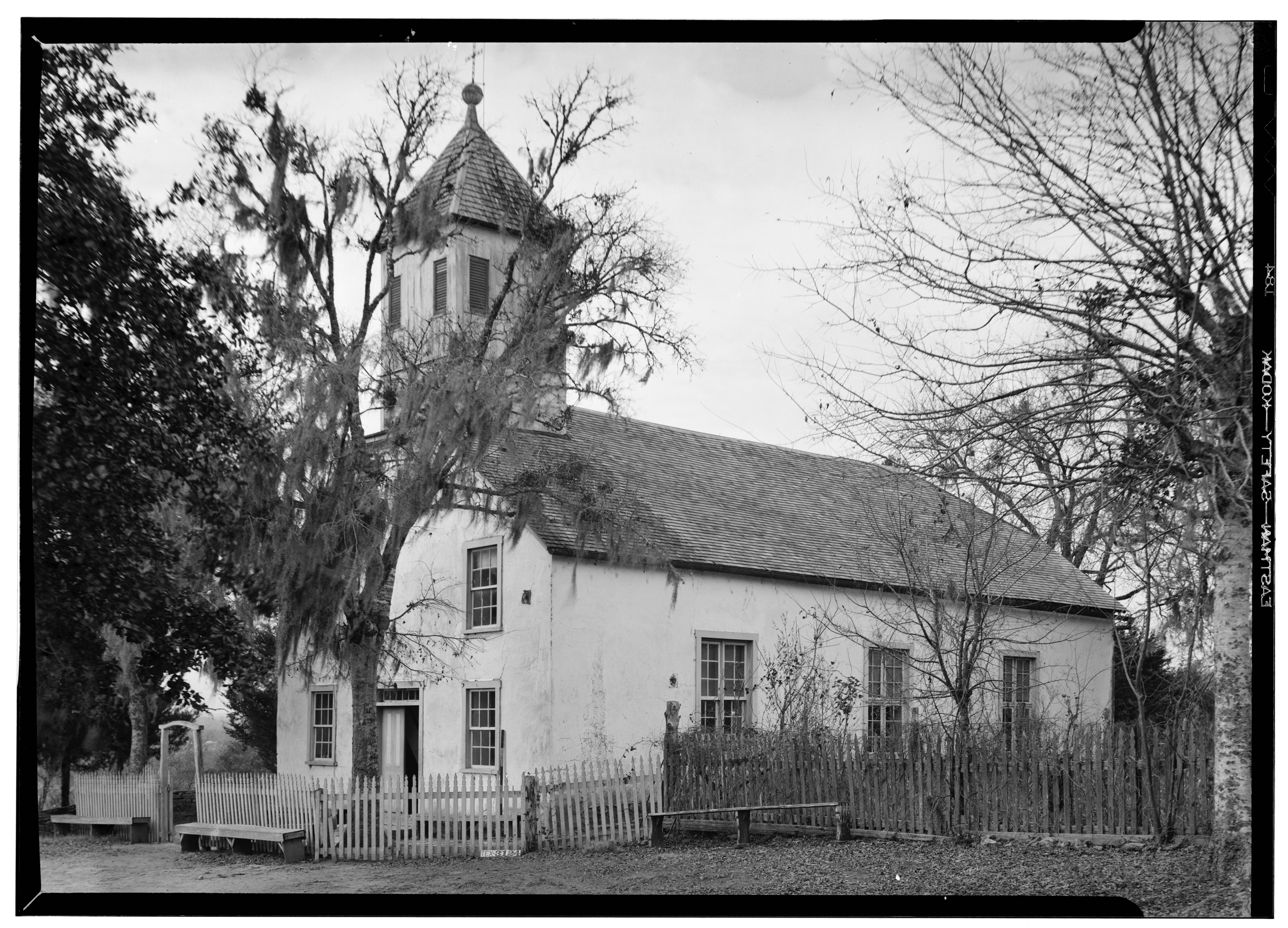
Front and west elevation (1936)

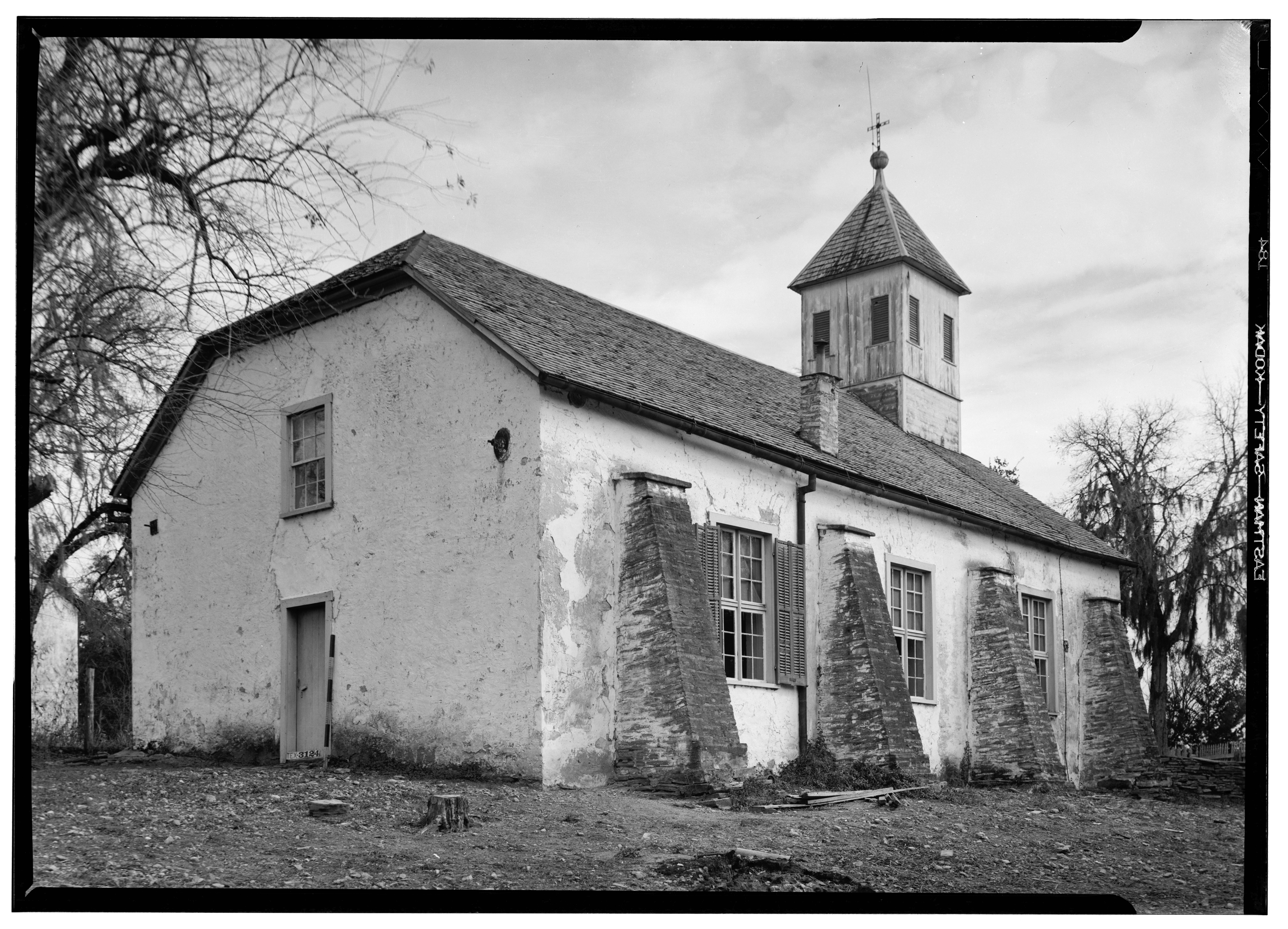
Rear and east elevation (1936)

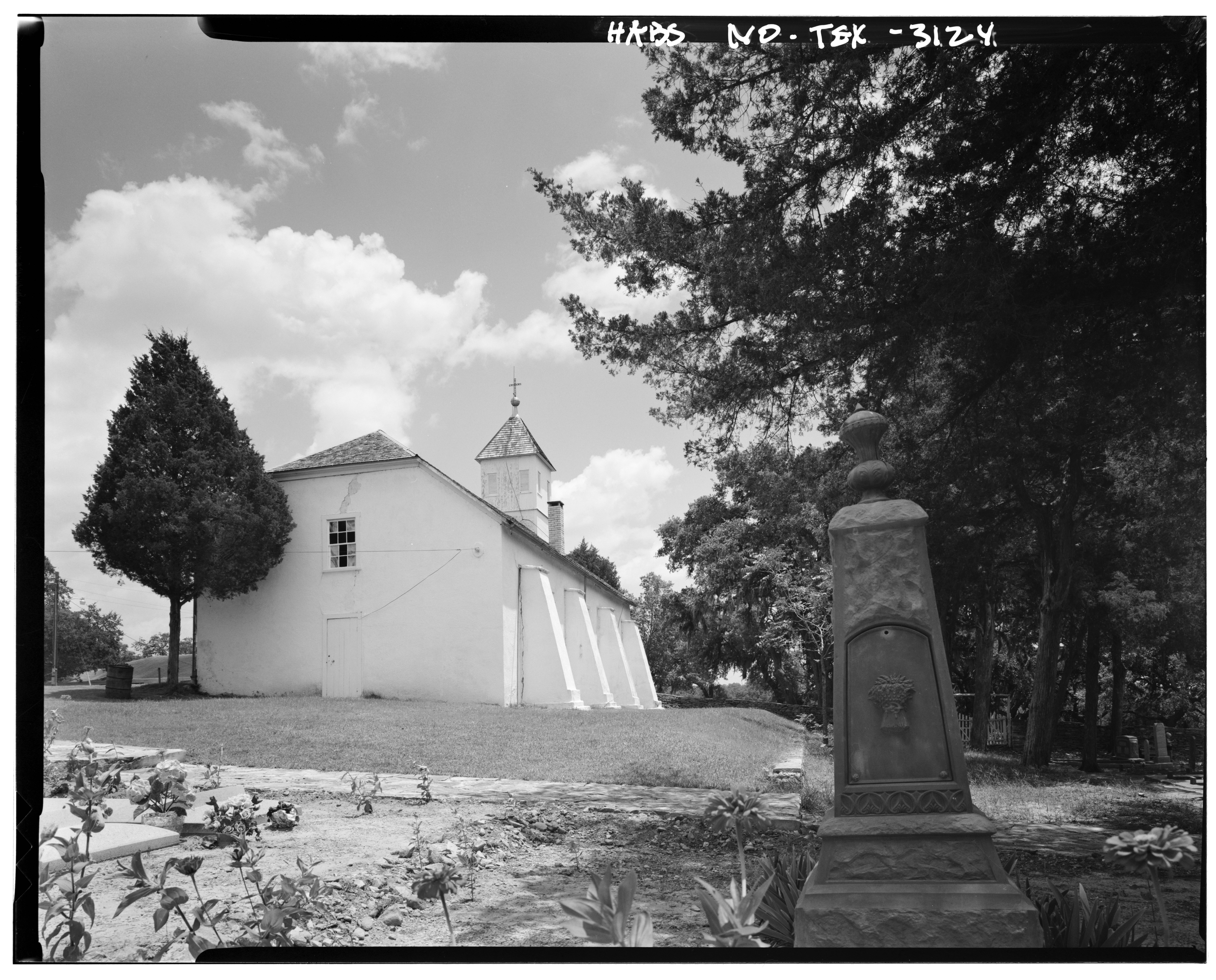
Rear (1972)

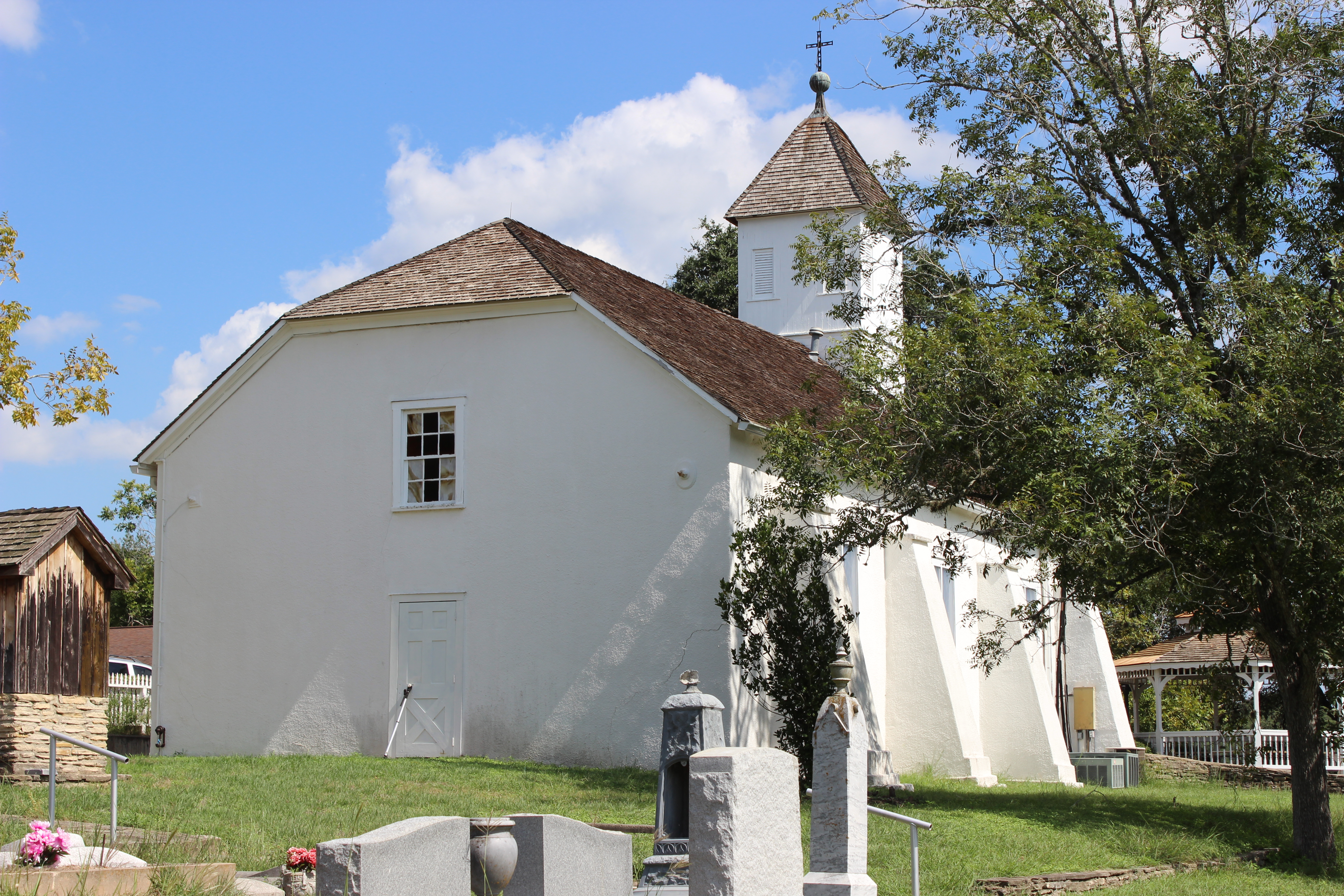
Rear and east elevation (2016)

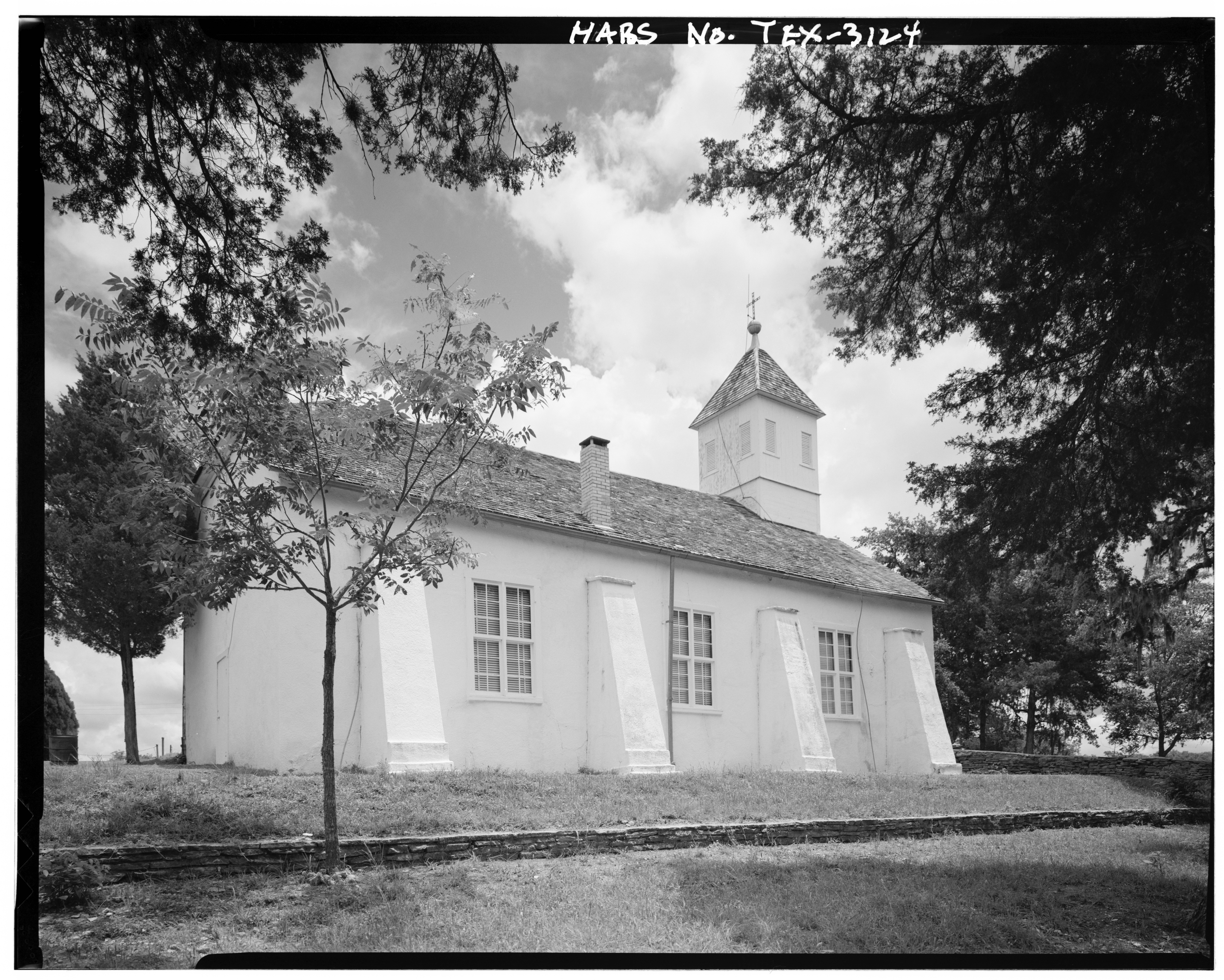
East elevation (1972)

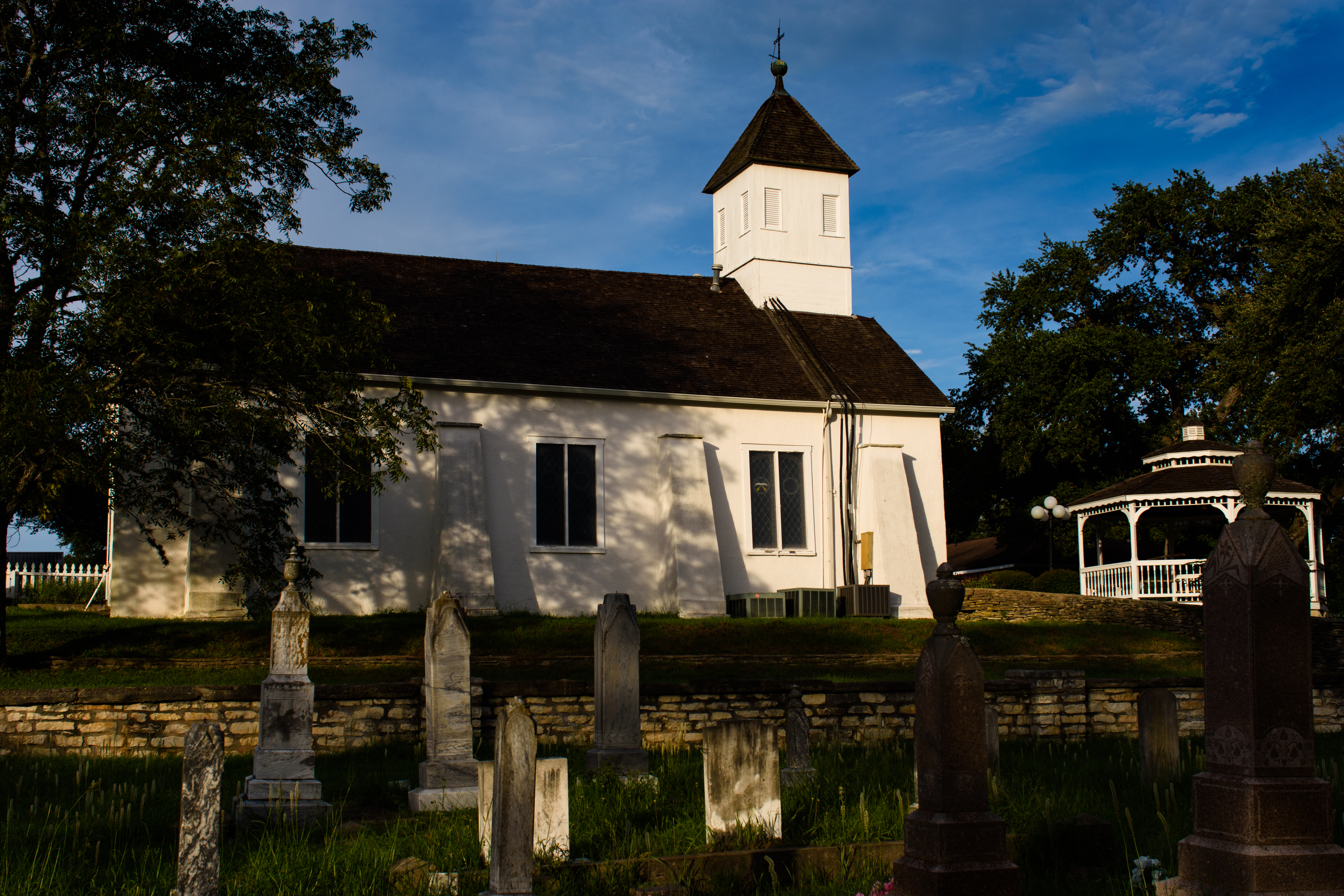
East elevation with graveyard (2016)

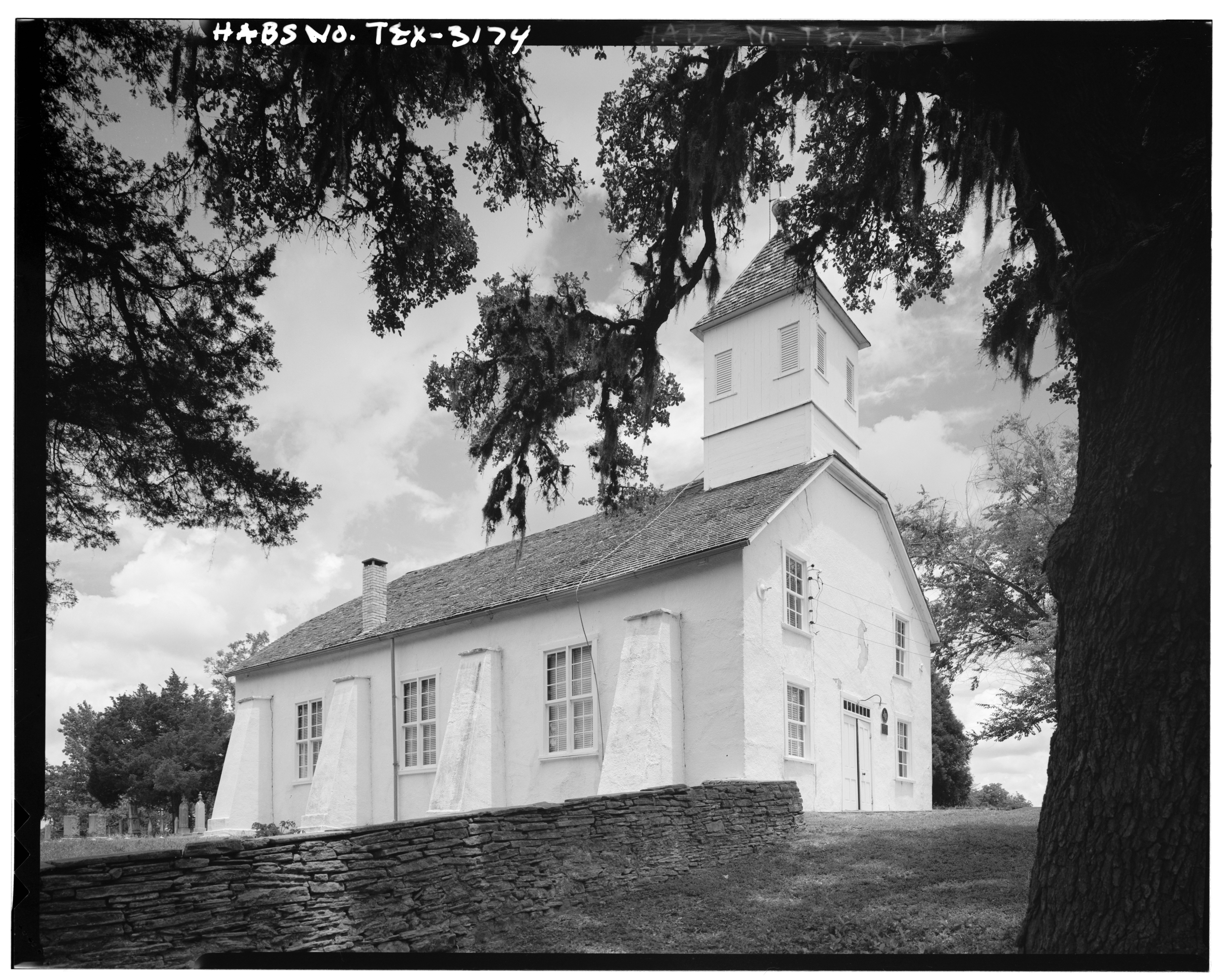
Front and east elevation (1972)

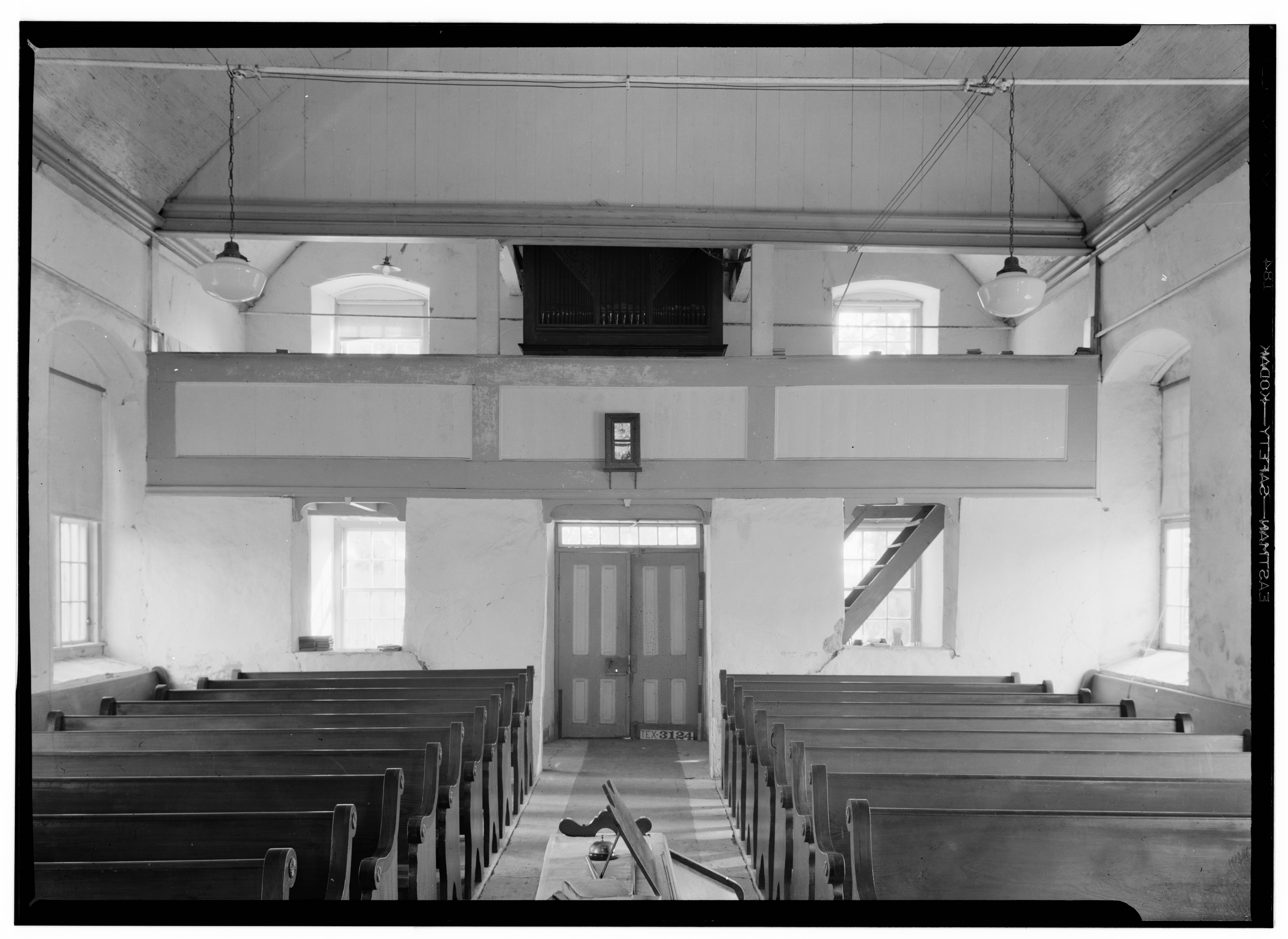
Front entrance and choir loft (1936)

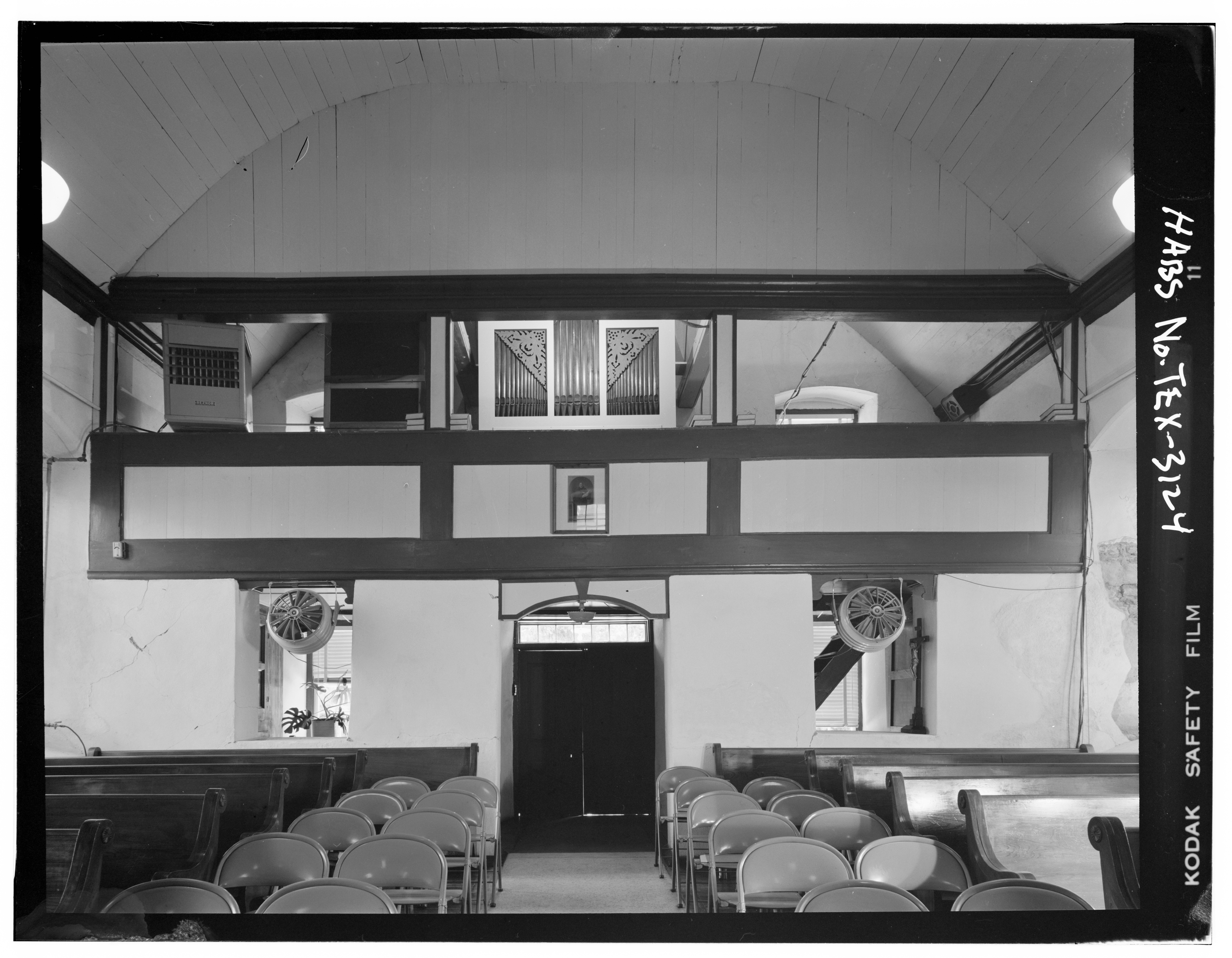
Front entrance and choir loft (1972)

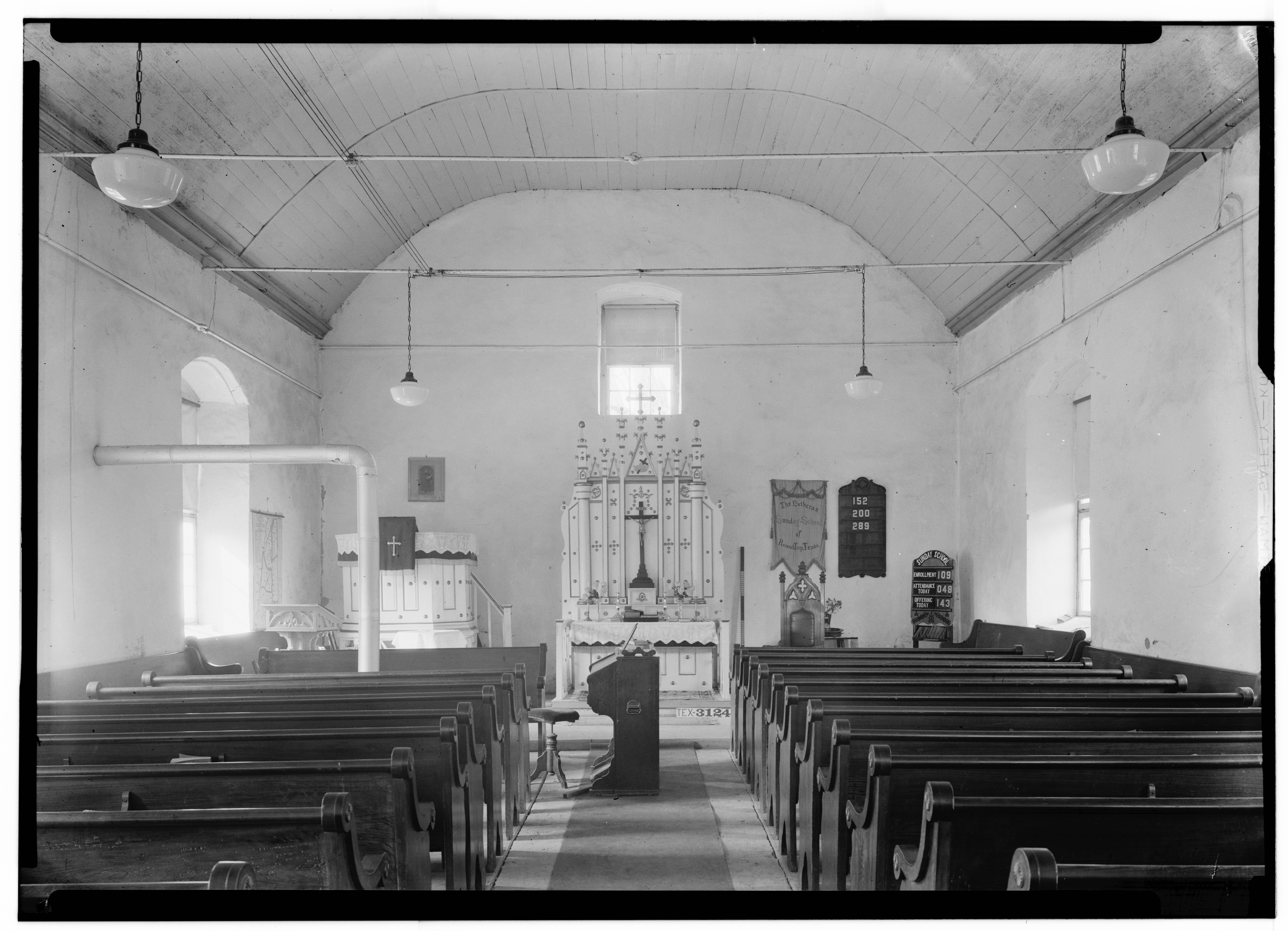
Interior toward chancel (1936)

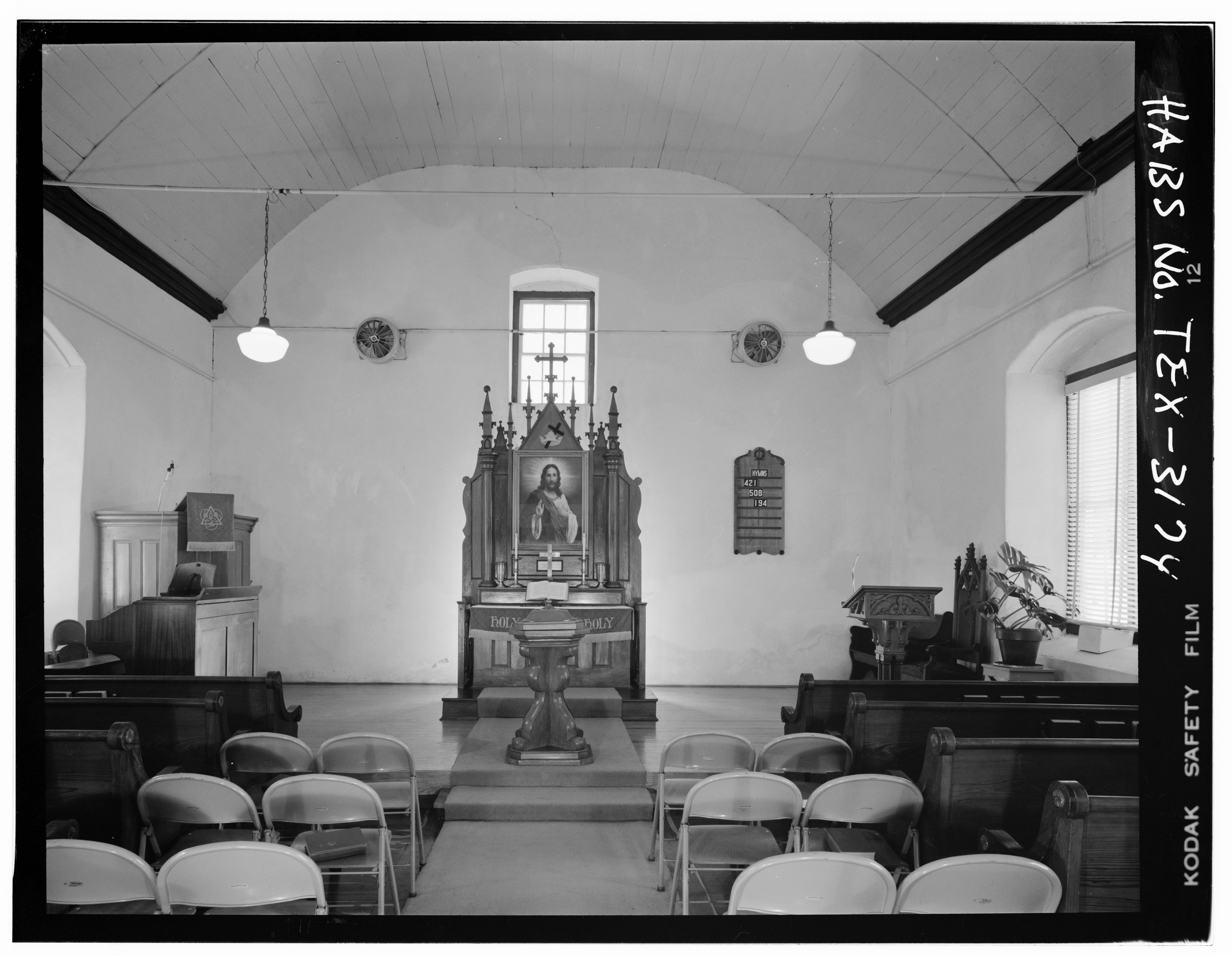
Interior toward chancel (1972)
Photography: Harry L. Starnes (1936); Roy Pledger, Roy (1972); Mustangsally (2014); Brant Kelly (2016); Renelibrary (2017).

== See also ==
- National Register of Historic Places listings in Fayette County, Texas
- Recorded Texas Historic Landmarks in Fayette County
