= St. Mary's Catholic Church (Fredericksburg, Texas) =

Historic church in Texas, United States

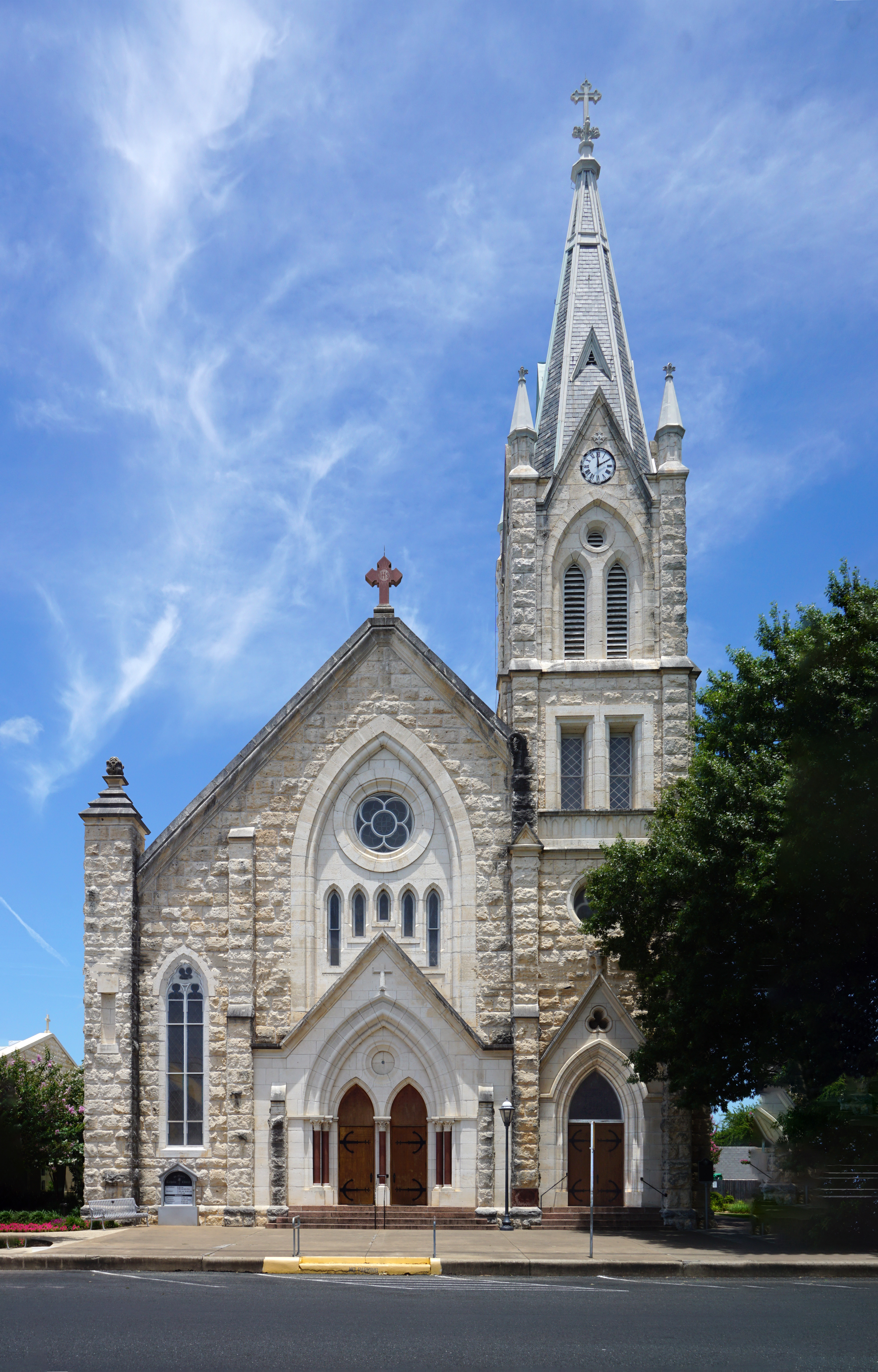
- St. Mary's Catholic Church in 2017

- Location within Texas Location within the United States
- 30°16′37″N 98°52′35″W
- Location: 306 W. San Antonio St. Fredericksburg, Texas
- Denomination: Roman Catholic
- Website: http://church.stmarysfbg.com/

History
- Status: Parish church
- Dedicated: 1906

Architecture
- Functional status: Active
- Architect: Leo M.J. Dielmann
- Style: Gothic Revival
- Years built: 1905-1906

Administration
- Diocese: Roman Catholic Archdiocese of San Antonio
- St. Mary's Catholic Church
- U.S. National Register of Historic Places
- U.S. Historic district – Contributing property
- Recorded Texas Historic Landmark
- Area: less than one acre
- Built by: Jacob Wagner
- Part of: Fredericksburg Historic District (ID70000749)
- MPS: Churches with Decorative Interior Painting TR
- NRHP reference No.: 83003143
- RTHL No.: 14697

Significant dates
- Added to NRHP: June 21, 1983
- Designated CP: October 14, 1970
- Designated RTHL: 1995

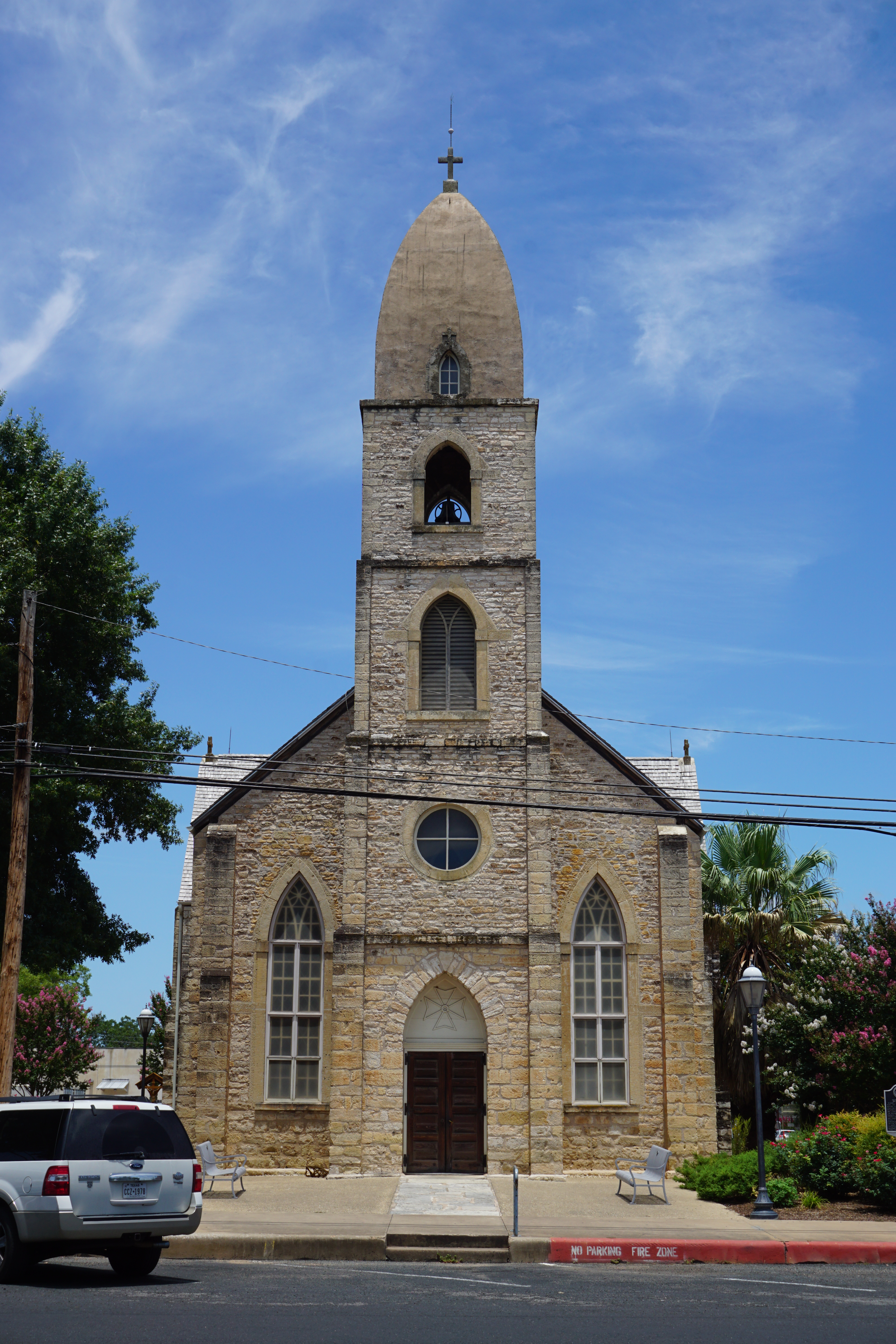
Old St. Mary's Church (1863) in 2017

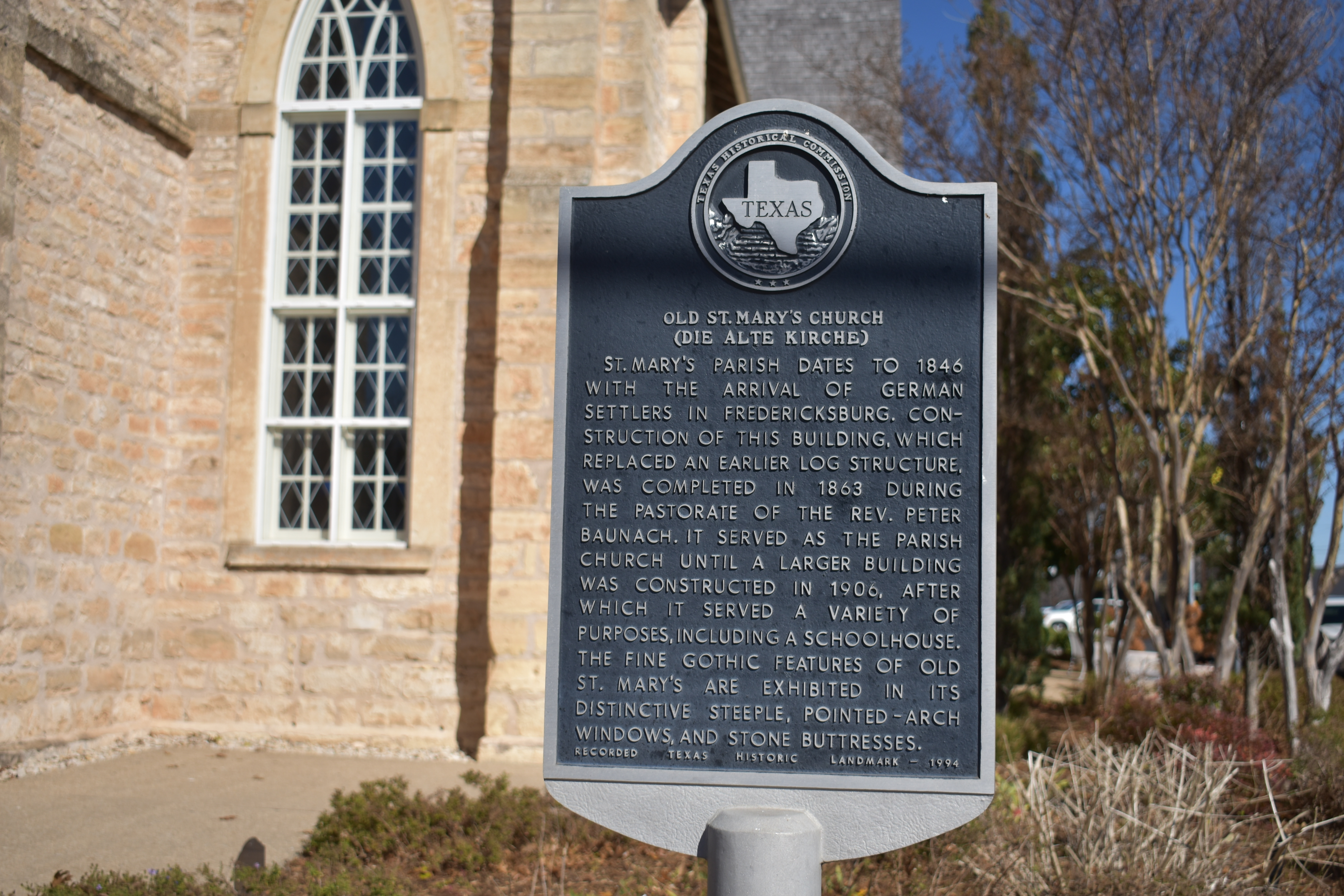
Texas Historical Commission sign at the church

St. Mary's Catholic Church is a Roman Catholic church at 306 W. San Antonio in Fredericksburg, Texas.

== History ==
=== Old St. Mary's ===
The first Catholic church in Fredericksburg was a log house built in 1848. In 1861 it was replaced by a stone building, completed in 1863. Now called Old St. Mary's, since 1906 this building has served several purposes, including as a schoolhouse. Its place in the history of German immigration to Texas lead it to be listed as a Recorded Texas Historic Landmark in 1994.

=== St. Mary's today ===
By 1901 the church building was too small for the congregation. A new church was designed by San Antonio architect Leo M.J. Dielmann and built by contractor Jacob Wagner in 1906. The current St. Mary's contains many Gothic features such as buttresses, trefoil motifs, and a corner tower rising high above the roofline. The interior contains extensive painting and murals, including on the organ pipes and ceiling vaults, leading to its inclusion in the National Register of Historic Places as a painted church. It is also part of the National Register's Fredericksburg Historic District, and a Recorded Texas Historic Landmark.

The current campus also includes Our Lady of Guadalupe Catholic Church at 302 East College Street. Originally opened in 1919, it was closed in the 1940s, then reopened as a mission of St. Mary's for Spanish speakers in 1983.

== See also ==
- National Register of Historic Places listings in Gillespie County, Texas
- Recorded Texas Historic Landmarks in Gillespie County
