= Monastery of Our Lady of Charity =

- U.S. National Register of Historic Places
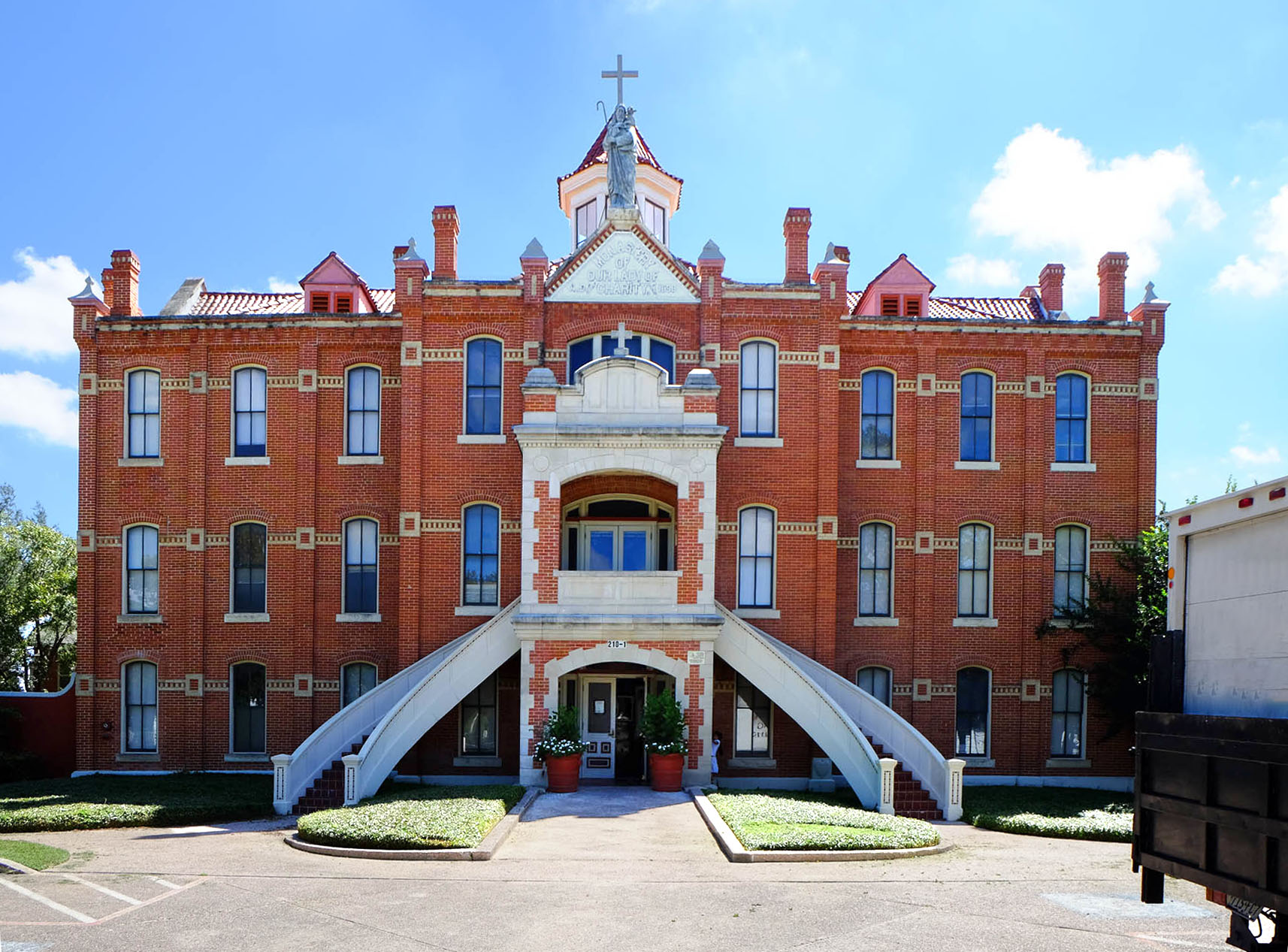

- Location within Texas Location within the United States
- Location: 1900 Montana; San Antonio, Texas
- Coordinates: 29°25′5″N 98°26′56″W
- Area: 6.8 acres (2.8 ha)
- Built: 1899
- Architect: Murphey, James; Dielmann, Leo M. J.
- Architectural style: Italianate, Gothic
- NRHP reference No.: 99000719
- Added to NRHP: June 25, 1999

Monastery of Our Lady of Charity is a historic church monastery at 1900 Montana in San Antonio, Texas.

It was built in 1899 and added to the National Register of Historic Places in 1999.
