= Our Lady of Lourdes Church (Victoria, Texas) =

Historic church in Texas, United States

- U.S. National Register of Historic Places
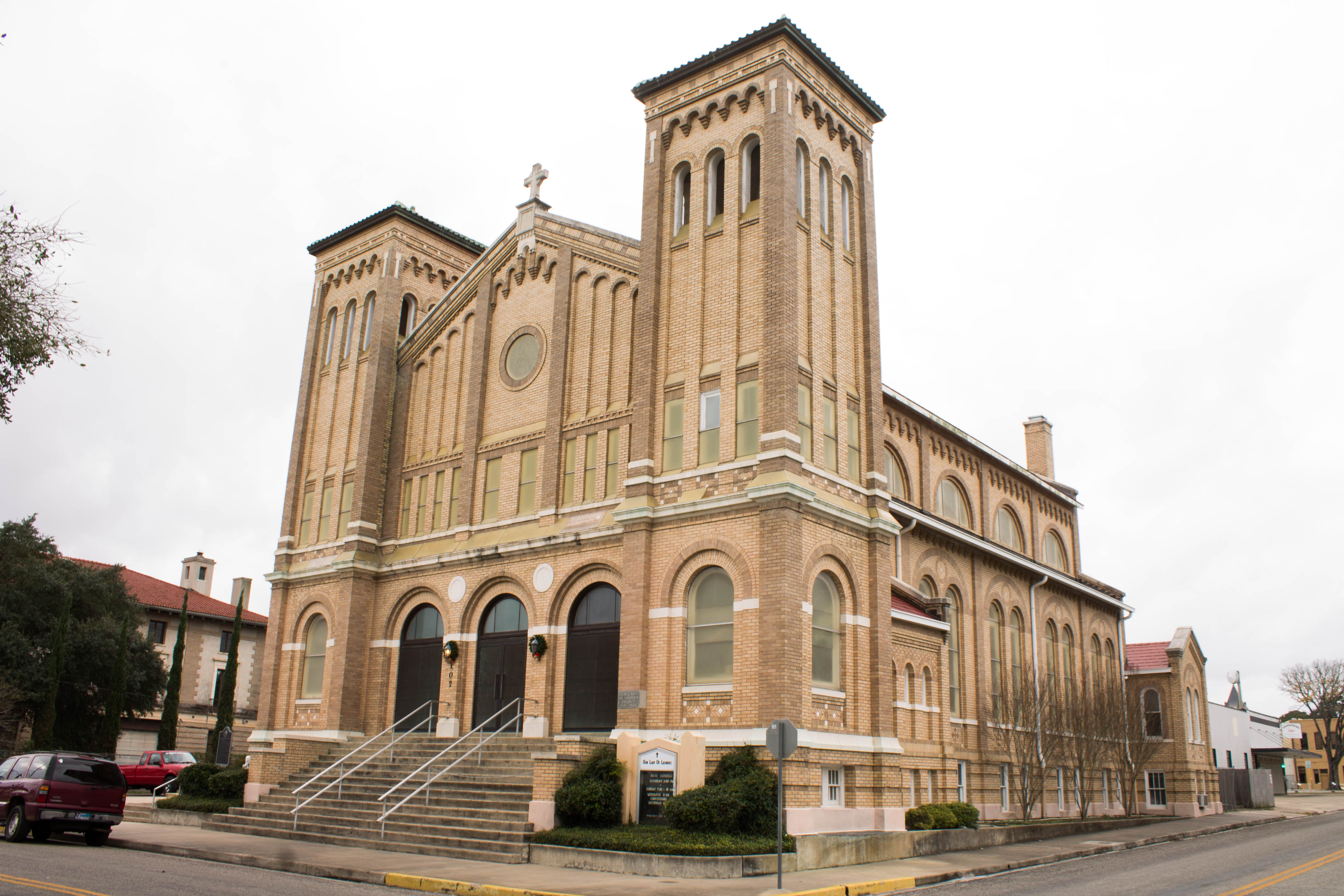
- Our Lady of Lourdes Church in 2015

- Location within Texas Location within the United States
- Location: 105 N. William, Victoria, Texas
- Coordinates: 28°47′57″N 97°0′18″W
- Area: less than one acre
- Built: 1923
- Built by: A.W. Fuessel
- Architect: Leo M.J. Dielmann
- Architectural style: Romanesque
- MPS: Victoria MRA
- NRHP reference No.: 86002601
- Added to NRHP: December 9, 1986

Our Lady of Lourdes Church is a historic church at 105 N. William St. in Victoria, Texas.

It was built in 1923 and added to the National Register of Historic Places in 1986.

== See also ==
- National Register of Historic Places listings in Victoria County, Texas
