= Simon Pytlovany House =

- U.S. National Register of Historic Places
- Recorded Texas Historic Landmark
- Location within Texas Location within the United States
- Nearest city: Dubina, Texas
- Coordinates: 29°42′45″N 96°50′20″W
- Built: 1909
- Built by: Simon Pytlovany
- Architectural style: Vernacular Ukrainian Izba
- NRHP reference No.: 75001972

Significant dates
- Added to NRHP: April 14, 1975
- Designated RTHL: 1975

The Simon Pytlovany House is a historic house in Fayette County, Texas. It is located about 1.5 miles (2.4 km) south of Dubina on FM 1383. It is an example of immigrants bringing building styles to their new homes. The house is built in the style of a Ukrainian Izba. It was listed on the National Register of Historic Places on April 14, 1975, and designated a Recorded Texas Historic Landmark.

== Construction ==
It is built from large timbers 6 to 8 inches (150 to 200 mm) square. The frame was first built upside down with the ceiling framework on the ground, it was then disassembled and put together upright. Splice and hole fittings, not nails, were used. This was not only structurally strong but facilitated the assembly, disassemble, invert, reassemble process. The frame was filled with split logs (mostly cedar) approximately 12 inches (300 mm) apart. The space was filled with a pseudo adobe of mud, shelled maize head and horse manure. The manure created a stronger chemical bond and provided undigested straw. The walls were 14 to 18 inches (360 to 460 mm) when completed. Twigs and sticks were added as needed for reinforcement and a top coating of yellow clay and straw served as a finishing plaster and preservative.

== Simon Pytlovany ==
Simon Pytlovany immigrated from Ukraine in 1896 with his wife, two children and father arriving in Galveston, Texas. After several moves he was a share cropper in Dubina until he bought this property in 1904 and built the home there in 1909. The structural timbers used to build the house were from a church destroyed in a hurricane that year. Pytlovany's design for his house closely resembles the plan of a traditional Ukrainian Izba with its modified rectangular plan with additions and entry on the long sides and steeply gabled shingled roof.
