= Nativity of Mary, Blessed Virgin Catholic Church =

Historic church in Texas, United States

- U.S. National Register of Historic Places
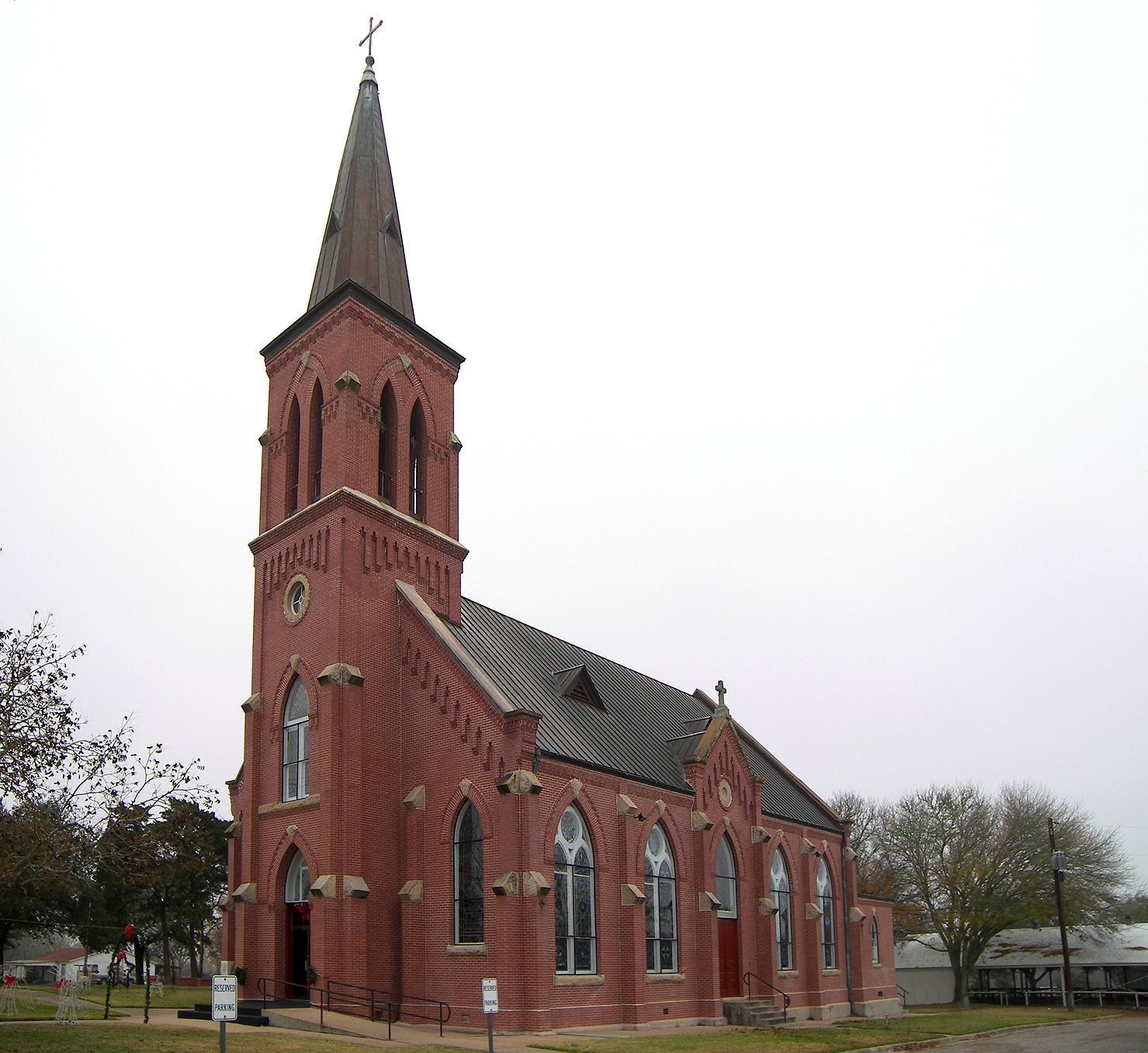
- Nativity of Mary Church in 2008

- Location within Texas Location within the United States
- Location: FM 2672, High Hill, Texas
- Coordinates: 29°43′2″N 96°55′38″W
- Area: less than one acre
- Built: 1906
- Built by: Frank Bohlmann
- Architect: Leo M. J. Dielmann
- Architectural style: Gothic Revival
- MPS: Churches with Decorative Interior Painting TR (64000835)
- NRHP reference No.: 83003136
- Added to NRHP: 21 June 1983

Nativity of Mary, Blessed Virgin Catholic Church is a historic church located at 2833 Farm to Market Road 2672 in High Hill, Texas. The church, which was built in 1906, was designed by prominent Texas church architect Leo M.J. Dielmann. Dielmann designed the red brick church in the Gothic Revival style. The interior of the church was painted by Ferdinand Stockert and Hermann Kern in 1912. The pair painted designs on canvas and affixed them to the church walls, resulting in decorations which resemble wallpaper. The designs were drawn freehand and include symbols such as angels, crosses with crowns, Stars of David, and bunches of grapes. The church was added to the National Register of Historic Places in 1983.

== See also ==
- National Register of Historic Places listings in Fayette County, Texas
