= St. Mary's Catholic Church (Brenham, Texas) =

Historic church in Texas, United States

- St. Mary of the Immaculate Conception Parish
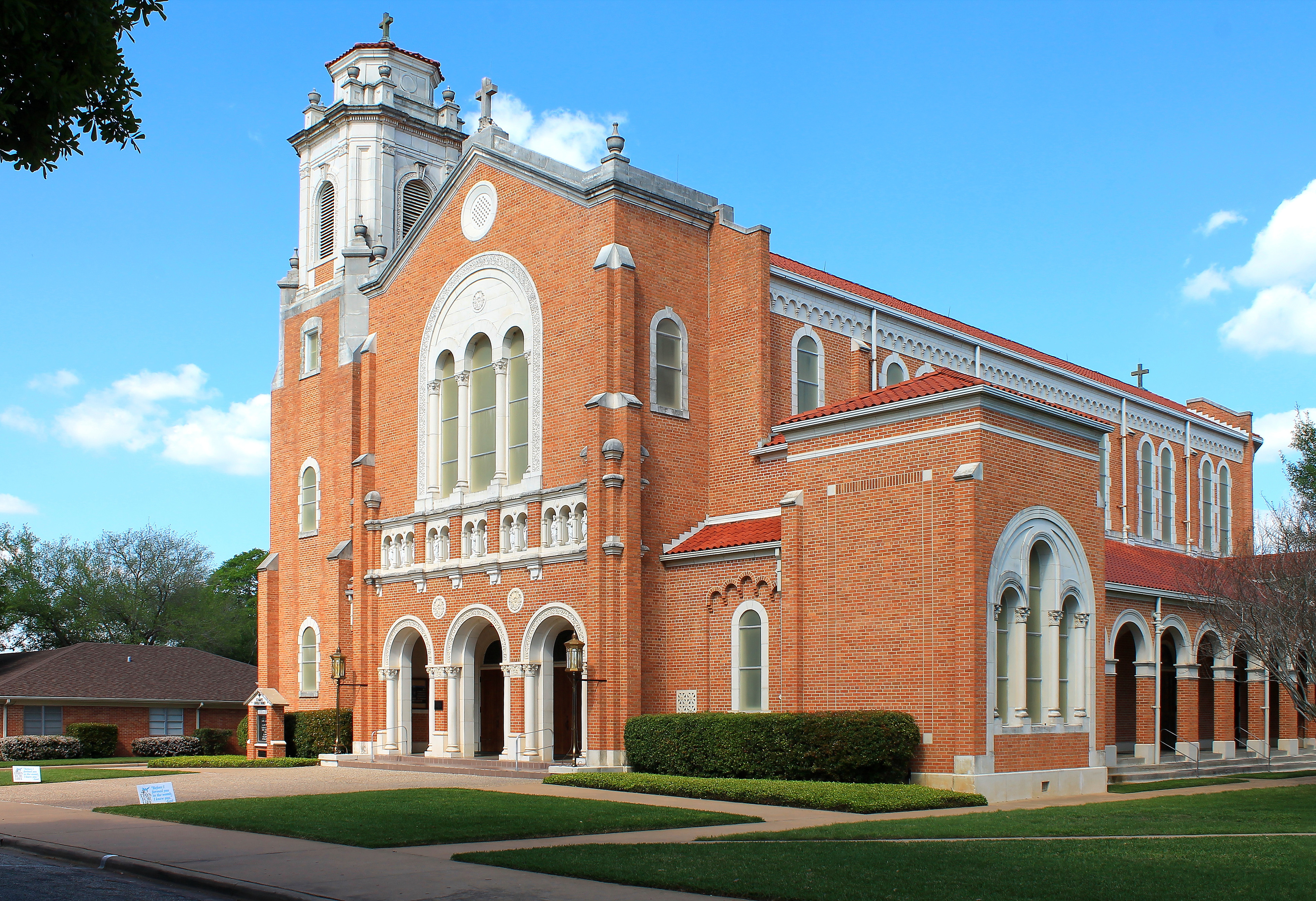
- St. Mary's Church in 2012

- 30°9′42″N 96°23′49″W
- Location: Brenham, Texas
- Address: 701 Church St, Brenham, TX
- Country: United States of America
- Denomination: Catholic
- Website: brenhamcatholic.org

History
- Status: Parish church
- Founded: 1870
- Dedication: Mary, mother of Jesus

Architecture
- Functional status: Active
- Heritage designation: National Register of Historic Places 90000452
- Designated: March 29, 1990
- Architect(s): Leo M. J. Dielmann, Alex Griffen
- Architectural type: Renaissance
- Completed: 1935

Administration
- Diocese: Roman Catholic Diocese of Austin

Clergy
- Pastor: Rev. Edwin Kagoo

St. Mary's Catholic Church is a historic Catholic church at 701 Church Street in Brenham, Texas.

The church community dates back to 1870. The current church building was built in 1935 and added to the National Register of Historic Places in 1990.

== See also ==
- National Register of Historic Places listings in Washington County, Texas
