= Dubina, Texas =

- Dubina Historic District
- U.S. National Register of Historic Places
- U.S. Historic district
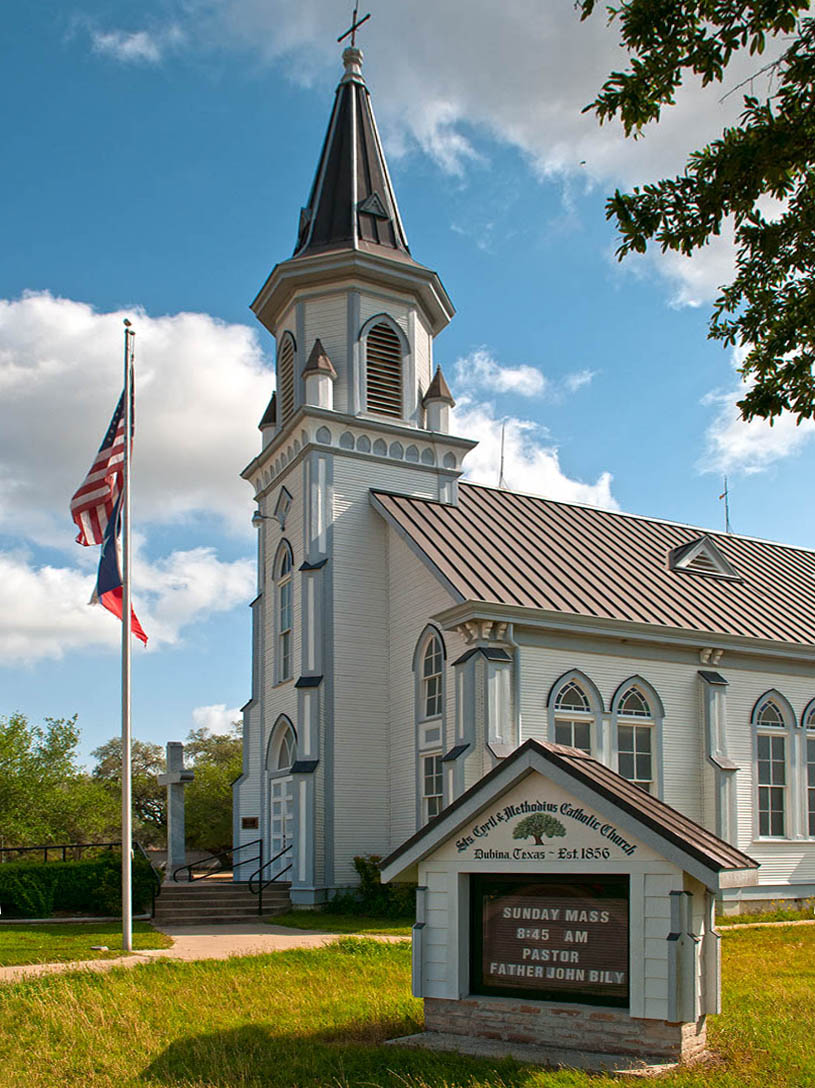
- Sts. Cyril & Methodius Catholic Church in 2011

- Location within Texas Location within the United States
- Location: Roughly bounded by FM 1383 and Cty Rd. 480, Dubina, Texas
- Coordinates: 29°43′44″N 96°50′8″W
- Area: 19 acres (7.7 ha)
- Built: 1866
- Architectural style: Late Gothic Revival, Bungalow/Craftsman
- NRHP reference No.: 03000970
- Added to NRHP: 27 September 2003

Dubina is a small unincorporated community in Fayette County, Texas, United States. It currently is home to a population of approximately 44 persons, but it was once a thriving community. Dubina was the first Czech settlement in Texas and dates from 1856. It is located 90 miles west of Houston and 104 miles east of San Antonio. Most of the town since 2003 has been designated as the Dubina Historic District on the National Register of Historic Places.

The naming of this settlement as Dubina ("oak grove") goes back to one of the first nights spent by the settlers. As the story goes, the settlers were travelling, looking for a suitable place to settle down when it started raining. They sat down under a very large oak tree for shelter and looked around, realizing how comfortable this place was. They then settled there, giving it what they considered the appropriate name.

After the Civil War, Dubina became a toehold for recently arrived Czech immigrants. The nearby town of Hackberry was for German settlers.

Dubina has some historical buildings, the most famous of which is one of Texas' painted churches, Saints Cyril and Methodius.

== See also ==
- National Register of Historic Places listings in Fayette County, Texas
