= Ammannsville, Texas =

- Unincorporated community
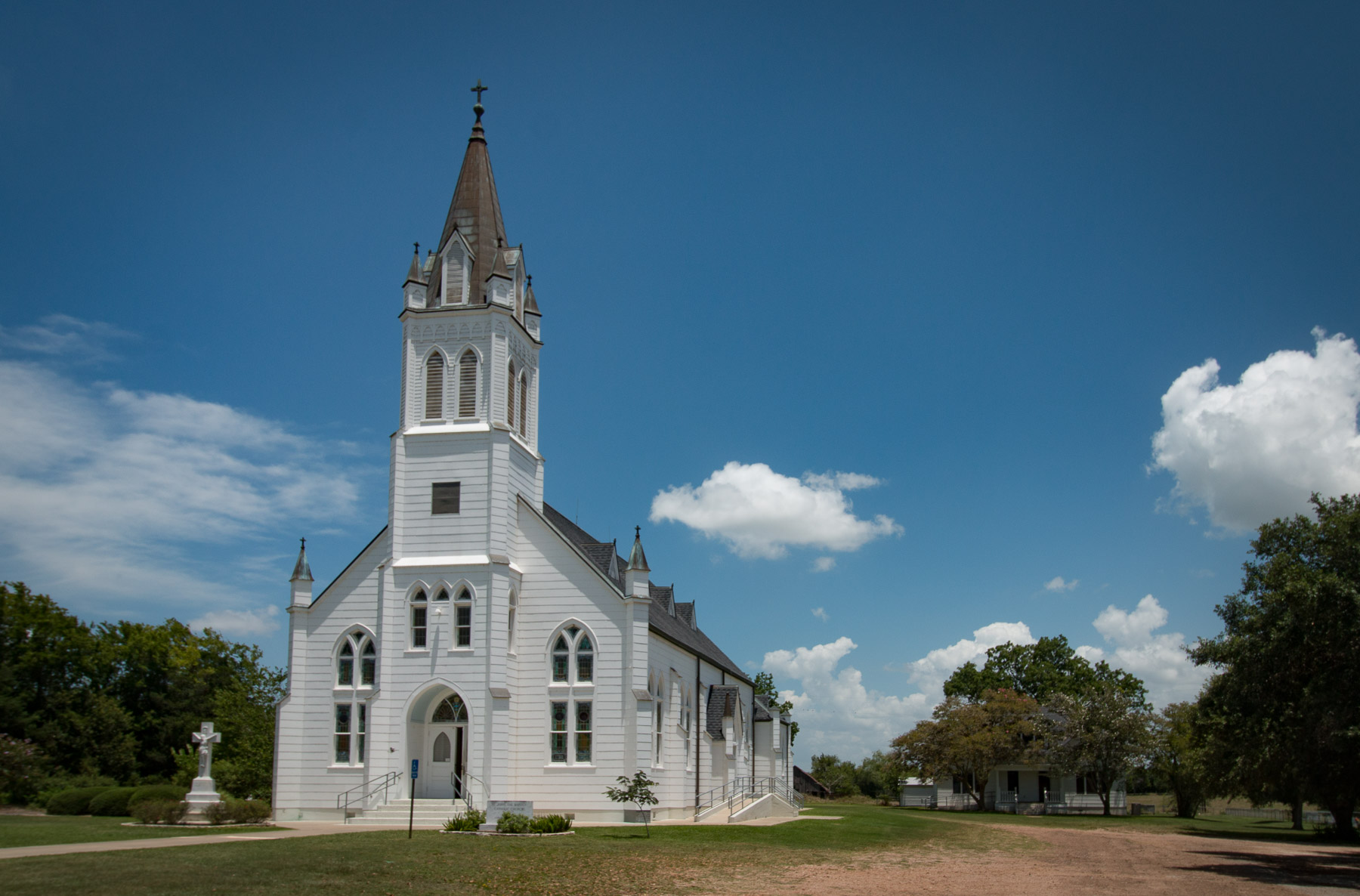
- St. John the Baptist Catholic Church

- Location within Texas Location within the United States
- Coordinates: 29°47′21″N 96°51′31″W
- Country: United States
- State: Texas
- County: Fayette
- Elevation: 404 ft (123 m)

Population (2000)
  - Total: 42
- Time zone: UTC-6 (Central (CST))
  - Summer (DST): UTC-5 (CDT)
- Area code: 979
- GNIS feature ID: 1329504

Ammannsville is an unincorporated community in southeastern Fayette County, Texas, United States.

== History ==
The area was originally settled by architect Andrew Ammann in 1870. From 1876, a number of business were established, along with a Catholic church, post office and a school.

St John the Baptist church was destroyed in 1909 by a hurricane. The church was rebuilt, but was destroyed by fire eight years later. The church was rebuilt in 1919. The church is known as 'the pink church' due to its interior being painted the color of cotton candy.
