= High Hill, Texas =

Unincorporated community in Texas, US

Coordinates: 29°43′05″N 96°55′38″W

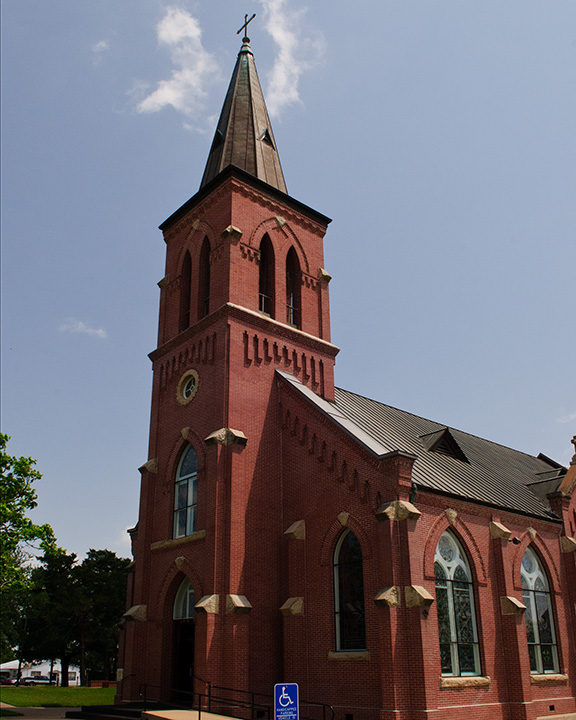
St. Mary Catholic Church in High Hill, Texas

High Hill is an unincorporated community in southwestern Fayette County, Texas, United States. It is located on Farm to Market Road 2672, three miles northwest of Schulenburg, Texas.

== History ==
The area was originally part of the E. Anderson league and was settled in the 1830s. During the late 1840s, German immigrants established several small settlements: Blum Hill, Wursten and Oldenburg. The Old High Hill Cemetery is located in what was the community of Blum Hill. The original part of High Hill was named Blum Hill after Robert Blum (1804–1848), the German political activist who organized the Vaterlandsverein, advocated mass education, freedom of the press, and the right of free assembly. He was arrested and executed in Vienna. Blum was a tragic victim of Germany's Revolutions of 1848. Oldenburg, a second village, named for the German province of Oldenburg, was established about one and one-half miles north of Blum Hill in approximately 1860. St. Mary's Catholic Church is located in what was Oldenburg. About the same time, the village of Wursten developed between Blum Hill and Oldenburg. Apparently it was named after the good sausage that could be purchased there at the Anders Butcher Shop.

In 1858, the three communities were combined into one and named High Hill. The name High Hill came about when someone suggested they choose a "high hill" type of name to remind them of the mountains they left behind in Germany and Austria.

Early settlers in the area were German and Austrian-Moravian and included the Heinrich, Kleinemann, Seydler, Ebeling, Hillje, Siems, Steurcke, and Nordhausen families. Henry Ebeling opened a store in Oldenburg in 1847, and John F. Hillje was operating a cotton gin and gristmill in the community by 1856. In 1860, the community was granted a post office with the name High Hill. High Hill had a local Turnverein. Two private schools existed in the community; Mrs. August Richter directed the community dramatic players; and the Männer choir and orchestra were in great demand at the state Sänger Fests. In 1869, the community comprised six stores, three blacksmith and wheelwright shops, a hotel, and a brewery. According to some sources, residents of High Hill refused to allow the Galveston, Harrisburg and San Antonio Railway to build through their community in 1874, fearing that the railroad would destroy the tranquility and culture of the town, but with the building of the line to nearby Schulenburg, many of High Hill's residents moved there. A Catholic church had been constructed at High Hill by 1879, and by 1884 the town had 200 residents, four schools (including a Catholic parochial school), two saloons, two general stores, a church, and a steam gristmill and cotton gin. In 1900, the community reported a population of 134. The post office closed in 1907, and by 1940 High Hill had a population of seventy-five, a church, a school, and three businesses. From the 1960s through 2000 the unincorporated town reported a population of 116. In 2000, the town had three historical markers, and St. Mary's Catholic Church is on the National Register of Historic Places. The church is the focal point for a town celebration every Sunday before Labor Day.

The most prominent feature of High Hill is the prominent neo-Gothic Roman Catholic church that rises above the surrounding countryside, and can be seen from miles in all directions. The official name of the church is Nativity of the Blessed Virgin Mary, but is colloquially known as "St. Mary's". The parish played a significant role in the development of the German and Catholic heritage of Texas. The Catholic State League was formed here, and many of the church's clergy and leadership were raised in High Hill. The church was originally part of the San Antonio archdiocese, but was reassigned to the Diocese of Victoria in 1982.

The first parish church was built in 1869. A larger church was built in 1876, and the original building was used as a school. This newer church featured stained-glass windows donated by the people of the parish. When the present-day church was built, these beautiful original stained-glass windows were moved to the new and larger building, which was constructed in 1906 and painted in 1912. The current church is known as "Queen of the Painted Churches" and is listed in the National Register of Historic Places. On January 9, 2011, the parish celebrated its 150th anniversary. The parish hosts its annual picnic on the Sunday of Labor Day weekend.

The current church building was one of the first churches built by noted Texas architect, Leo M.J. Dielmann. It was built in 1906. Dielmann was the son of a contractor who already had a history of serving the Catholic Church of Texas in various building projects. Fresh from his architecture studies in Germany, the young Dielmann designed a classic gothic revival structure for the small German settlement of High Hill. In the late 1800s and into the 1900s, the Catholic hierarchy attempted to influence communities in Texas to build in the more practical "Spanish" or "Mission" style of architecture. This style was championed because it suited the hot climate more effectively than gothic structures. Yet, this Mediterranean style was rejected by German and Czech immigrant groups who came to Texas during this period. Church leadership wanted communities to build their churches of brick or stone. Too many early wood churches were destroyed by fire or storms. Our research indicates that the church leadership sometimes refused to bless wood churches upon their completion. This makes the handsome red brick exterior of the Nativity of Mary, Blessed Virgin that much more important. While the interior is made of wood, it is protected by a brick exterior resistant to fire and storms. From an aesthetic standpoint, the exterior of High Hill shows Dielmann's early mastery of gothic proportions and rhythms. About the same time Dielmann's High Hill church was being erected, he took to working on another important commission. He was hired to design a church for the Catholic community in the frontier town of Fredericksburg in the Texas Hill Country.

The decorative painting of High Hill was executed by Ferdinand Stockert and Hermann Kern in 1912. They also painted the walls and ceiling of Saint Joseph's Catholic Church in San Antonio. Old timers in the parish remember their parents saying that Stockert and Kern first painted their images on canvas and then glued them to the wood walls. Today from the choir loft you can see the bubbles and now hardened canvas close up. When some first set eyes on High Hill, they say that it looks like wall paper—and actually, in many places that is what it is.

Church interior

In 2011, the church was meticulously restored by artist Robert Marshall of R. Alden Marshall & Associates, LLC. The restoration took nearly 12 months with a crew of up to nine individuals working 40 to 60 hour weeks. It included repairing canvas surfaces, repairing plaster, and fully restoring painted surfaces. An area in the vestibule was discovered to have once displayed the German language text of Psalm 47:10 and some decorative patterning. This was also fully restored.

== Catholic Life Insurance ==
In 1901, a group of German-Catholic immigrants to Texas who were united by faith, by language, by common concern for their fellow man and by their desire to protect their families, founded their own fraternal benefit society which is now known as Catholic Life. Originally called the Sterbekasse der Deutschen Katholiken von Texas, this group traces its roots to St. Mary's Church in High Hill, Texas. It was the first fraternal in Texas to admit both men and women as members, offer children's life insurance protection, and adopt the legal reserve system. Msgr. Henry Gerlach, longtime pastor of St. Mary's Church was the first policyholder of this new fraternal society.

While the name changed in the mid-1930s to Catholic Life Insurance, the organization's desire to help their fellow man and to protect their families has never diminished. Today, nearly 70,000 individuals rely on Catholic Life Insurance for their life insurance and retirement protection.

== Old High Hill Cemetery ==
The Old High Hill Cemetery is located on a six-acre tract on FM 2672, approximately one mile south of the St. Mary Catholic Church. The property on which it is situated was once the property of George Herder (1818–1887), a German immigrant and a veteran of the Battle of San Jacinto. The land was originally conveyed by John Herndon, N. W. Faison, and Henry Ebeling for the purpose of erecting a schoolhouse or college. Families who cherished the rolling hills of the High Hill countryside and its good farm land expressed the wish that it be their burial place when plans for the school did not materialize.

Many pioneers who developed the agricultural, business, and cultural pursuits of the community are buried in Old High Hill Cemetery. A few are: John Christian Baumgarten (1836–1912), who erected the first cottonseed oil mill in Texas for friend, John F. Hillje. John Christian Baumgarten worked diligently to have the railroad build through the area that would become Schulenburg and is recognized as "The Father of Schulenburg". Louis Schulenburg (1810–1887), after whom the town of Schulenburg is named. Friedrich Gustav Seydler (1806–1869), father of the first Wendish family to immigrate to Texas. Paul Stuercke Sr. (1827–1902), was a professor and in charge of the public school for 30 years. The oldest stones in the cemetery mark the graves of August Wolters and Friedrich Eicholt, who died in 1861. The cemetery contains approximately 400 graves. Many of the old High Hill settlers buried there have living descendants who remained responsible for its upkeep for many years. Family members cared for the site until 1963, when the Old High Hill Cemetery Association, Inc. was organized. In January 1976, an official Texas Historical Marker for the Old High Hill Cemetery was erected and dedicated. The marking of local historic sites and landmarks is part of the Texas Historical Commission's program to preserve history, arouse interest in historical places, and acquaint the people of the community with their unique heritage. The Old High Hill Cemetery is a perpetual care cemetery with a board of directors and Trustees which monitor activities. Meetings of the Old High Hill Cemetery Association are held each year on the last Sunday in April.

=== First Cottonseed Oil Mill in Texas ===
The first commercial cottonseed oil mill in Texas was erected in High Hill by Frederick Hillje around 1866. The barnlike structure consisted of stucco over brick, and utilized a German made sugar beet crusher adapted locally to seed processing. Hillje later enlarged the plant with regular milling machinery for cottonseed. After the Galveston, Houston & San Antonio Railroad bypassed High Hill, Hillje moved the mill to Weimar, 1880. An historical marker sponsored by Mrs. E. M. Hubbard, Chas. Herder Jr., Leroy Herder, Paul K. Herder, Henry Herder was erected, but has since gone missing.

== Notable person ==
Edmund Creuzbauer (1826–1871), also known as Creuzbaur, Confederate officer, was born in Baden, Prussia, on September 22, 1826. After serving as an artillery officer in the Prussian Army, Creuzbauer immigrated to Texas in the 1840s and settled at High Hill in Fayette County. On January 17, 1853, Creuzbauer married Eliza Welhausen at Cat Springs, Austin County.

On October 12, 1861, following the outbreak of the Civil War, Creuzbauer raised company A of the Fifth Texas Field Artillery, consisting primarily of German immigrants, in Fayette County. This unit assembled at Camp Brown, with Creuzbauer serving as captain, relocated to Ringgold barracks in November 1862, and was assigned to garrison duty in the Rio Grande valley throughout 1863. In the autumn of 1863, Creuzbauer and his unit were ordered to return to Central Texas to refit with larger guns. A controversy arose over the failure of the unit to receive new weapons, as well as Creuzbauer's ability as a commander, compelling Creuzbauer to submit his resignation on March 31, 1864. This resignation was under review when, in April 1864, Creuzbauer was ordered to the post at Sabine Pass on the Texas Gulf Coast, near Louisiana, to assist Confederate efforts to counter Union attacks at the nearby Calcasieu Pass. On May 6, Creuzbauer assisted in attacks on Union troops who were collecting livestock at Calcasieu Pass. This action culminated in the capture of Union gunboats Granite City and Wave. Shortly after the Battle of Calcasieu Pass, Creuzbauer's resignation was accepted, and he returned to farming along Buckners Creek in Fayette County, leaving command of the unit to his brother-in-law, Charles Welhausen. Creuzbauer died on March 5, 1871, in Fayette County. He was buried at Old High Hill Cemetery in High Hill, Fayette County.

== See also ==
- Nativity of Mary, Blessed Virgin Catholic Church
