= Fayette County Precinct No. 2 Courthouse =

Historic building in Texas

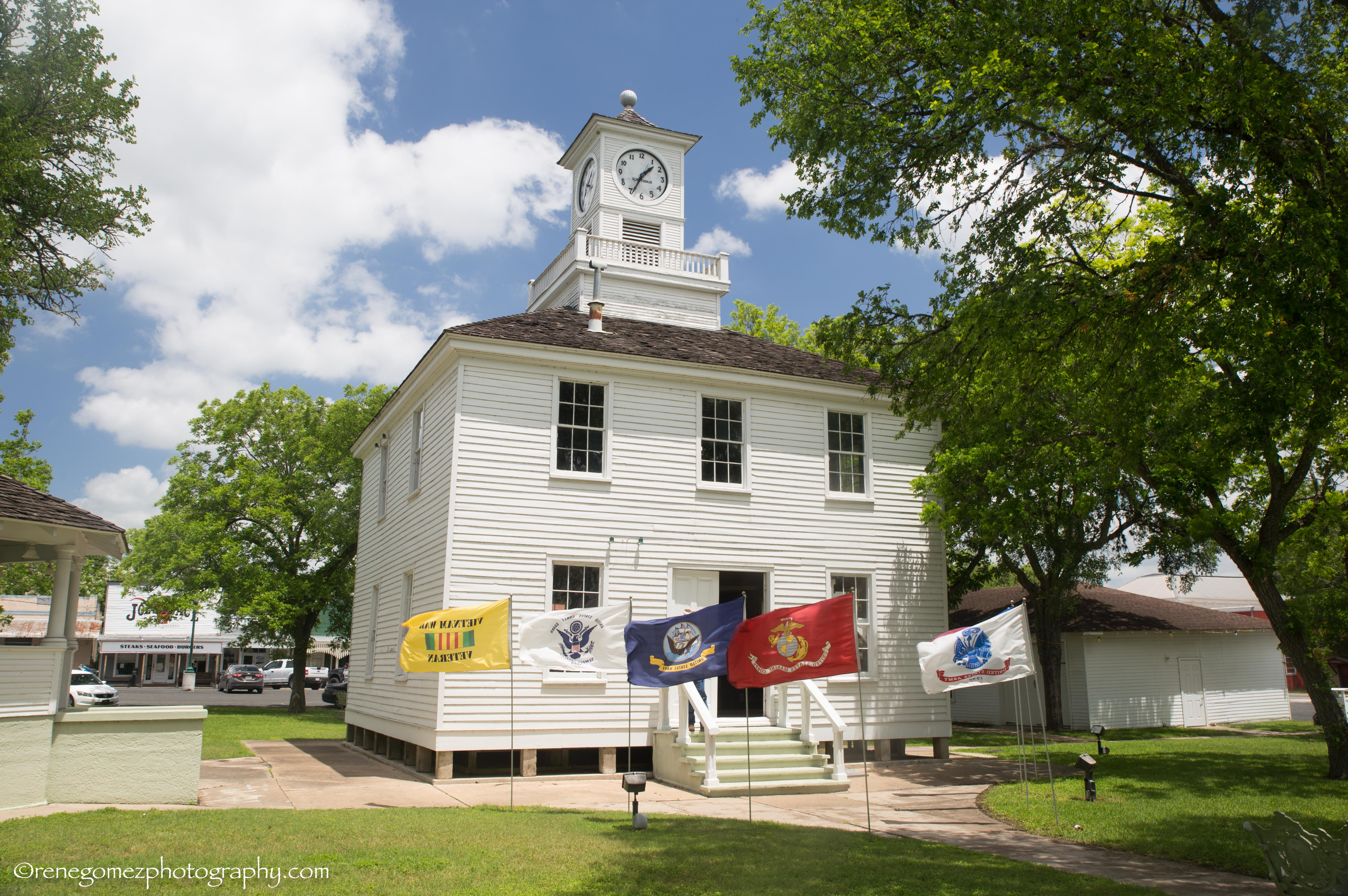
- Fayette County Precinct No. 2 Courthouse in 2019

- Fayette County Precinct No. 2 Courthouse in Fayetteville, Texas Fayette County Precinct No. 2 Courthouse (the United States)
- 29°54′26″N 96°40′26″W
- Location: Fayetteville, Texas

History
- Built: 1880
- Original use: courthouse

Site notes
- Architectural style: Victorian

U.S. Historic district – Contributing property
- Designated: 10 July 2008
- Part of: Fayetteville Historic District
- Reference no.: 08000657

Recorded Texas Historic Landmark
- Designated: 1977
- Reference no.: 1580

Fayetteville County Precinct No. 2 Courthouse is a historic building located in Fayetteville, Texas.

== Description and history ==
Built in 1880 it is of wood frame construction with horizontal wood siding and has a simple two story square plan. The south elevation is the facade with simple wood stairs and solid wood panel double doors. Windows are symmetrically placed with three bays on the north and south, and two on the east and west. Construction of the Victorian style building was funded by US$600 (equivalent to $20,017 in 2025) in contributions from the citizens of Fayetteville and an additional US$200 in tax funds from the County Commissioners' Court. Funding for painting the building was raised by holding a ball. A calaboose (holding jail) with two cells was finished in 1887. A clock tower, financed by a ladies club, was added in 1934 in the center of the hipped roof. It is no longer used as a courthouse. Precinct courthouses were quite rare in early Texas and this one was listed as a Recorded Texas Historic Landmark in 1997; on July 10, 2008 it was designated a contributing property to the Fayetteville Historic District.

== Photo gallery ==
Photographs of Fayette County Precinct No. 2 Courthouse in Texas
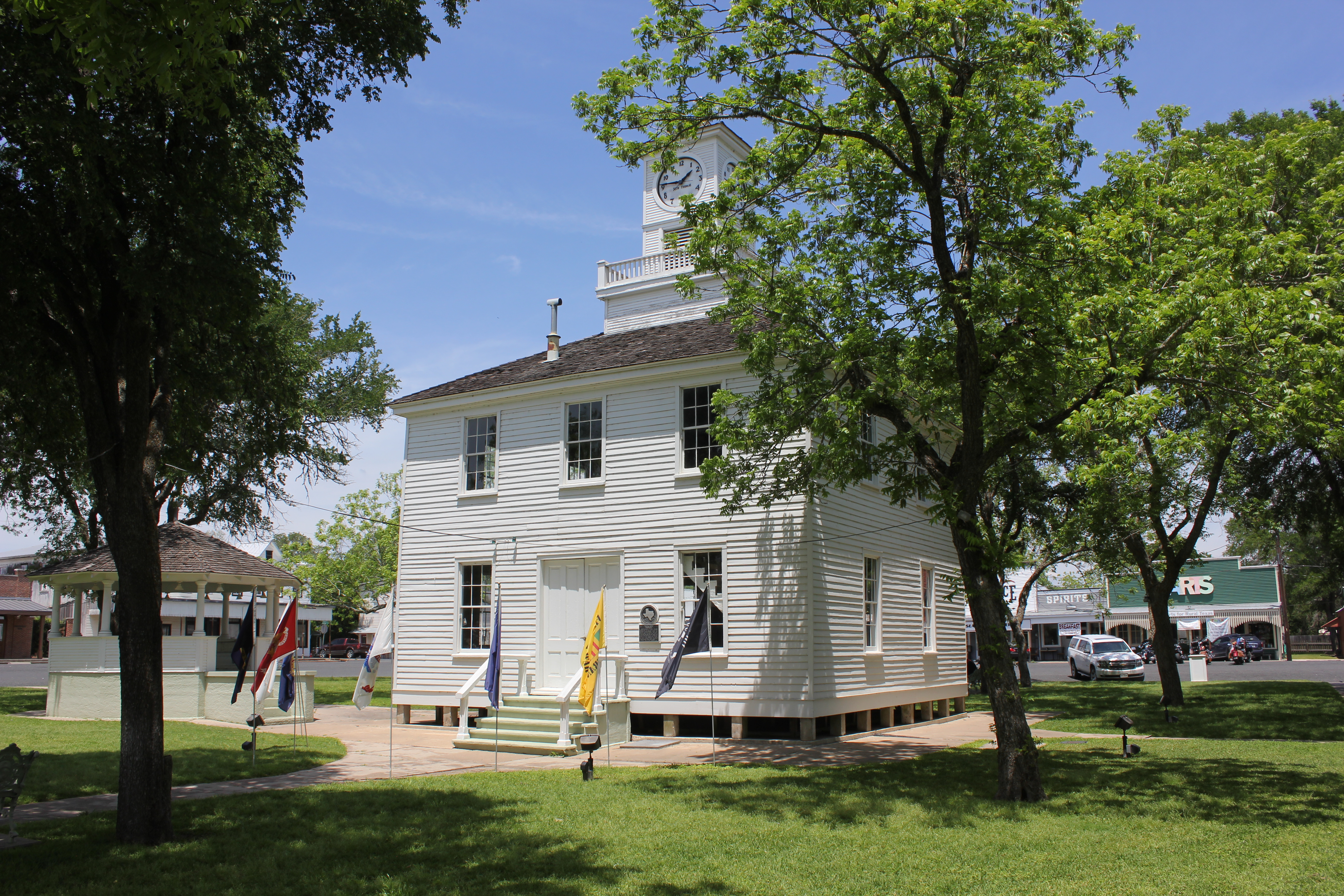
Facade (2018)

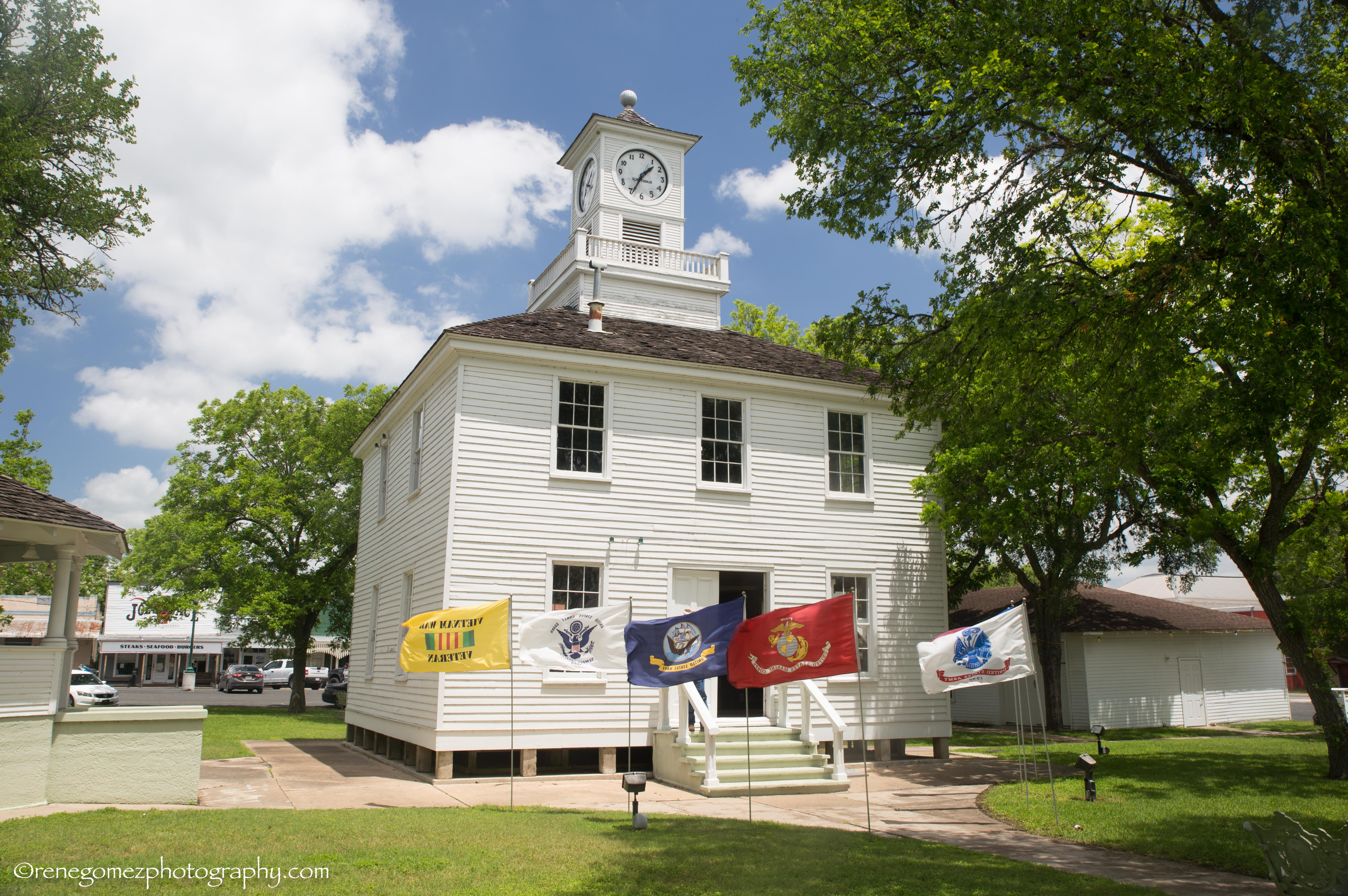
Facade (2019)

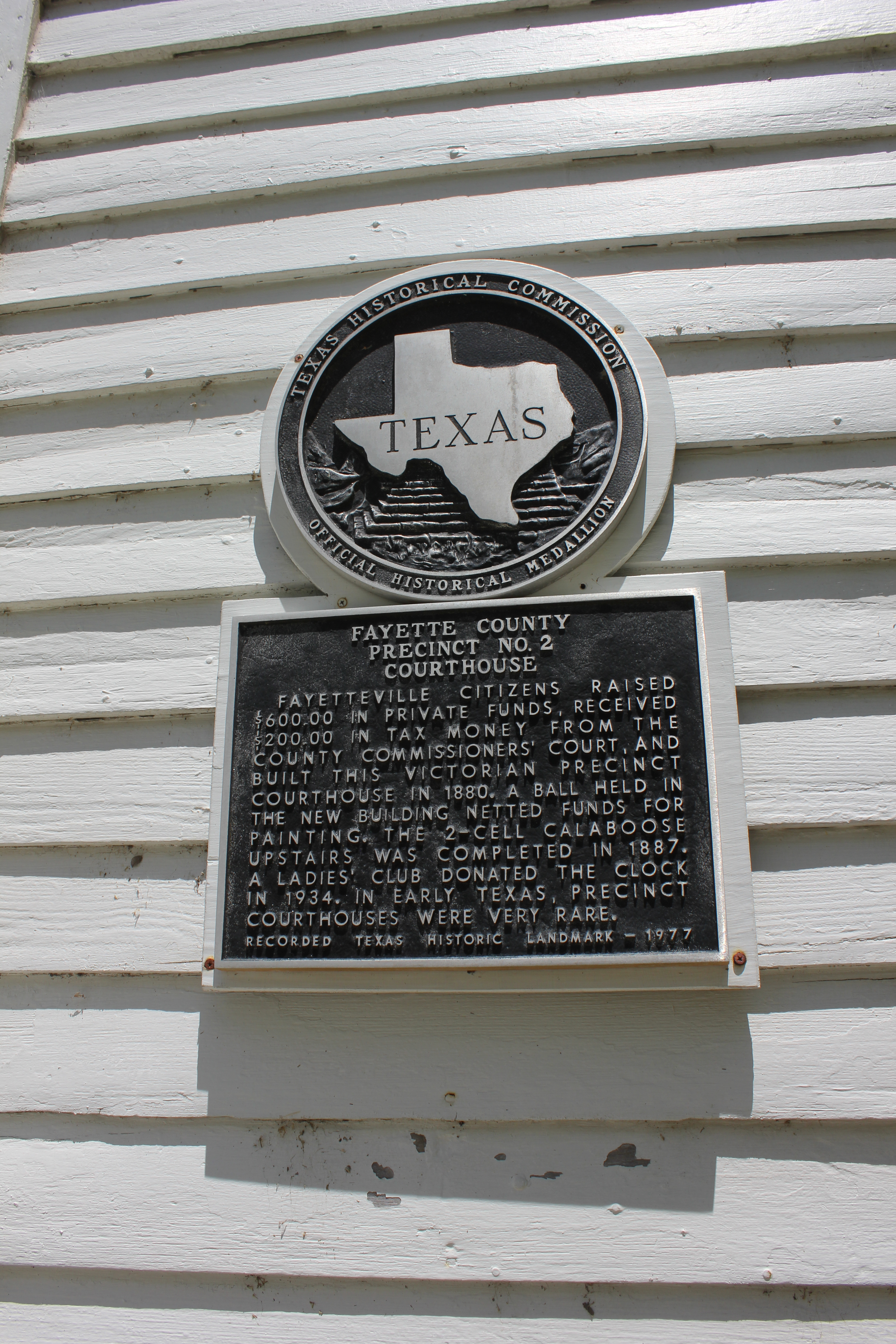
1977 Historic Marker (2018)
Photography: Nicolas Henderson (2018); Renelibrary (2019)

== See also ==
- List of Recorded Texas Historic Landmarks (Eastland-Gray)
