= Fayetteville High School =

Fayetteville High School may refer to:

- Fayetteville High School (Alabama), Sylacauga, Alabama
- Fayetteville High School (Arkansas), Fayetteville, Arkansas
- Fayetteville High School (Tennessee), Fayetteville, Tennessee
- Fayetteville High School (Texas), Fayetteville, Texas
- Fayetteville High School (West Virginia), Fayetteville, West Virginia
- Fayetteville Academy, Fayetteville, North Carolina
- Fayetteville Christian School, Fayetteville, North Carolina
- Fayetteville Street Christian School, Asheboro, North Carolina
- Fayetteville-Manlius High School, Manlius, New York
- Fayetteville-Perry High School, Fayetteville, Ohio
