= Zapp Building =

- U.S. National Register of Historic Places
- U.S. Historic district – Contributing property
- Recorded Texas Historic Landmark
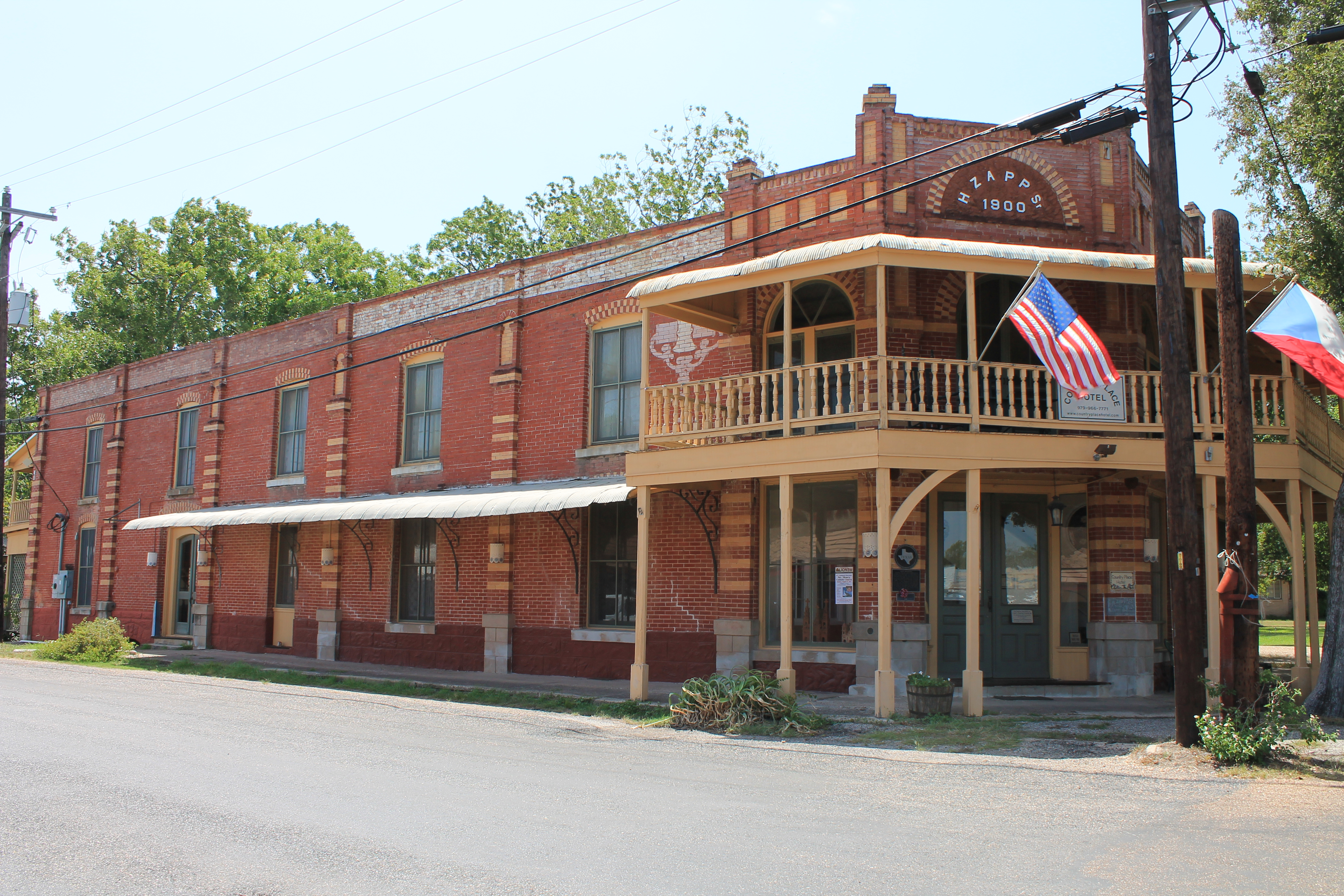
- The Zapp Building in 2013

- Location within Texas Location within the United States
- Location: Fayetteville, Texas
- Coordinates: 29°54′15″N 96°40′37″W
- Built: 1900
- Built by: Stidham & Kurtz
- Commissioned by: Hugo Zapp
- Architectural style: Romanesque Revival
- Part of: Fayetteville Historic District (ID08000657)
- NRHP reference No.: 83003139

Significant dates
- Added to NRHP: 23 June 1983
- Designated CP: 10 July 2008
- Designated RTHL: 1983

The Zapp Building, later known as the Country Place Hotel and Restaurant, is a historic building in Fayetteville, Texas, United States. It was built in 1900 by builders Stidham and Kurtz in the Romanesque Revival style for local merchant Hugo Zapp to replace a wooden building at the site which burned down. Zapp bought a shop at this prominent location at the northwest corner of the town square in 1876. It was added to the National Register of Historic Places on June 23, 1983, and designated a contributing property to the Fayetteville Historic District by the registrar on July 10, 2008.

== Description and history ==
Records indicate a store at this location as early as 1865. The property originally belonged to Phillip J. Shaver, who laid out the town of Fayetteville and sold this corner to Andrew Crier. W.H. and Elizabeth Donathan sold the shop to Zapp. The mercantile operation Zapp operated in the building sold yard goods, shoes and clothing which were displayed in the upper gallery. The site served many functions with hotel rooms, an undertakers parlor and a dentist's office housed upstairs while the cool basement was used to store milk brought by local farmers awaiting shipment by train to a creamery.

In addition to his mercantile business, Hugo Zapp speculated in land and was involved in the commercial activity of the town. He died in 1912 and Hugo Zapp Jr. continued operating the mercantile business and rental space in the building. Tenants have included a hospital, a school, a boarding house and during Prohibition a speakeasy in the basement. As of 1983 the building was in continued commercial operation with an architects office, an antique store and a restaurant on the first floor. The upstairs is operated as an inn.

One of five masonry buildings facing the town square it is the only one with traditional masonry construction. It is not known if the builders Stidham and Kurtz had plans prepared by an architect or designed the building themselves. It is a fine and well preserved example of Romanesque Revival style architecture. It is a rectangular two story red and yellow brick building on the eastern corner of Fayette and Washington streets with the entry at 45 degrees opening directly onto the street corner at the sidewalk.

== Photo gallery ==
Photographs of the Zapp Building
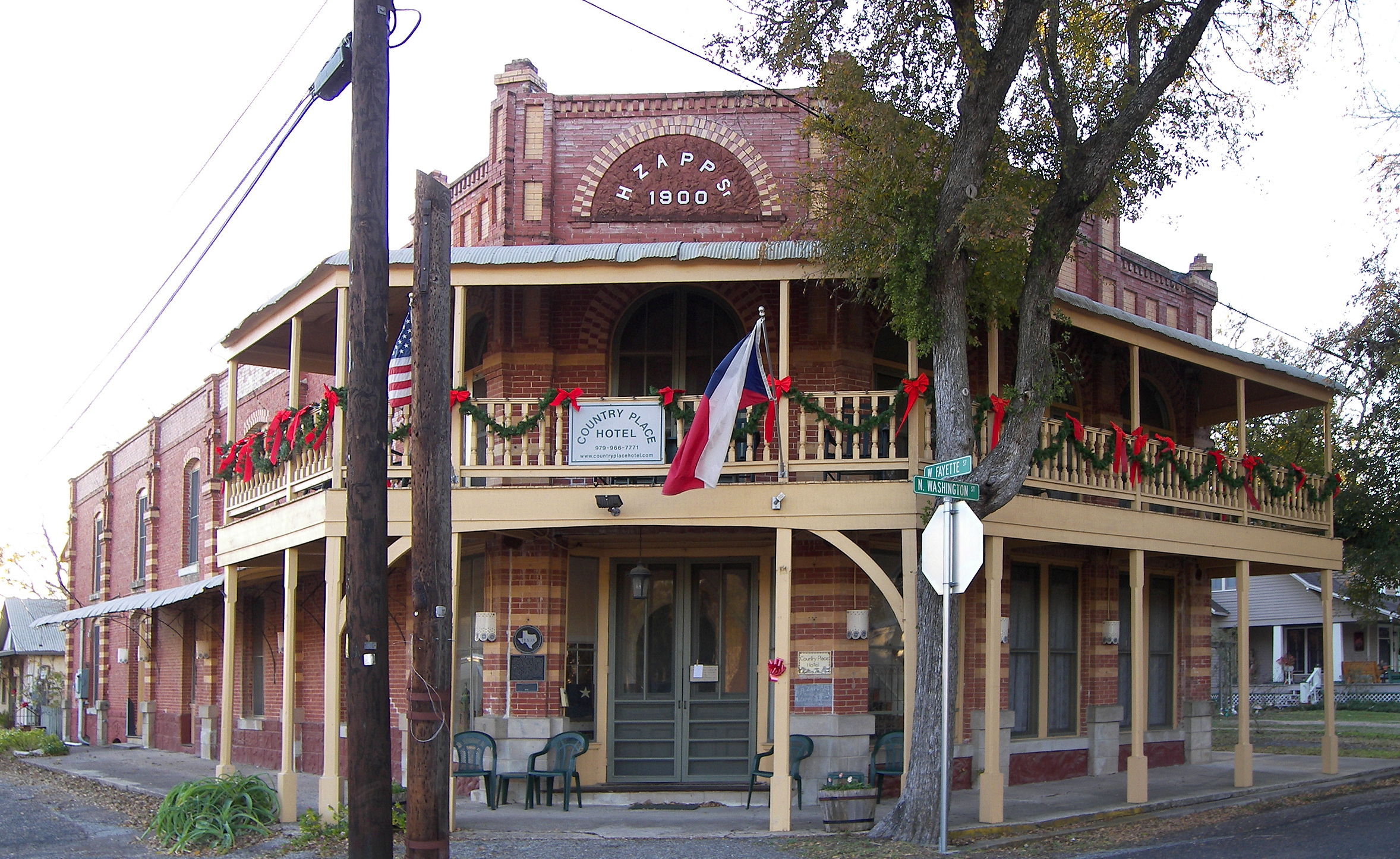
Corner entrance (2008)

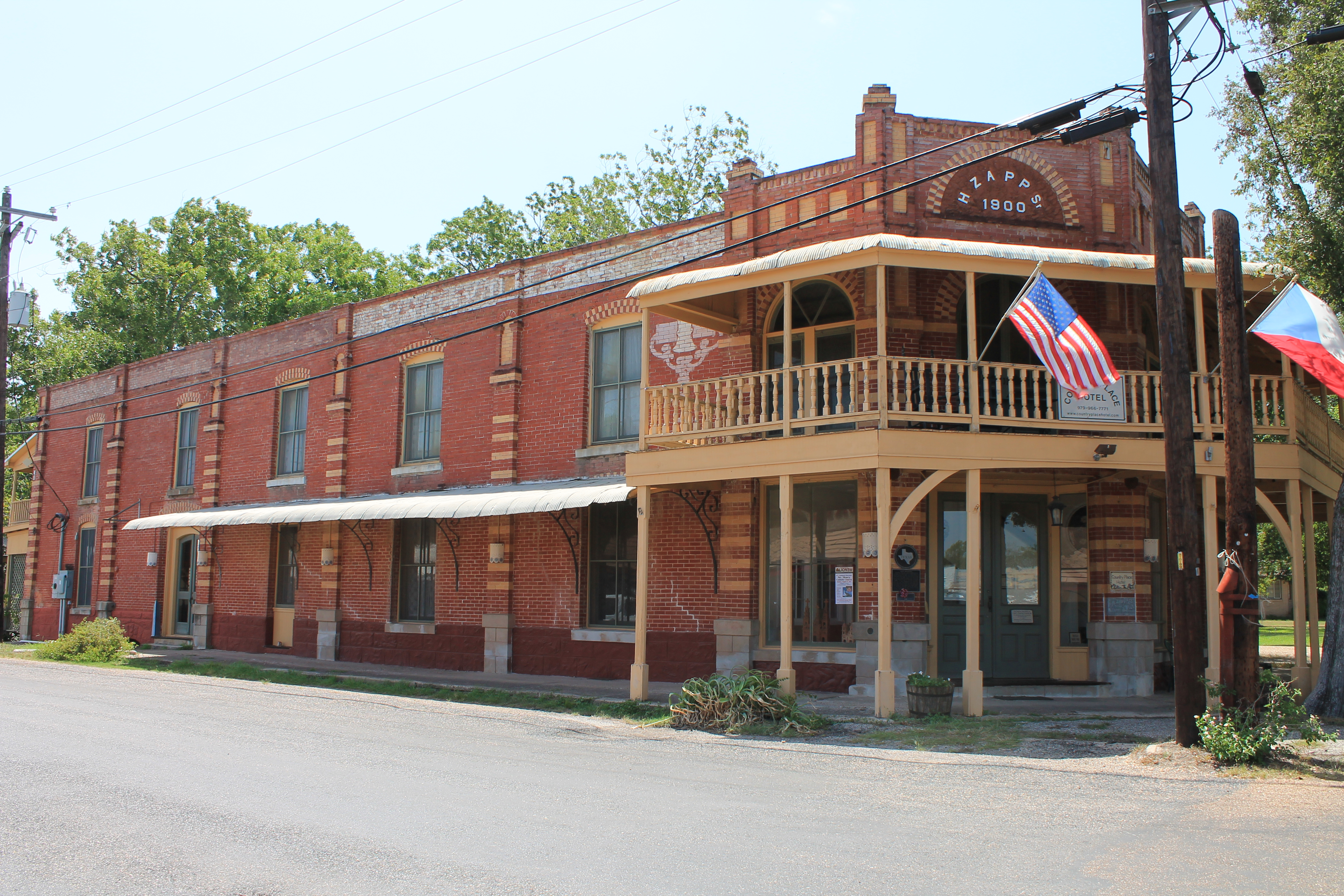
Facade (2013)

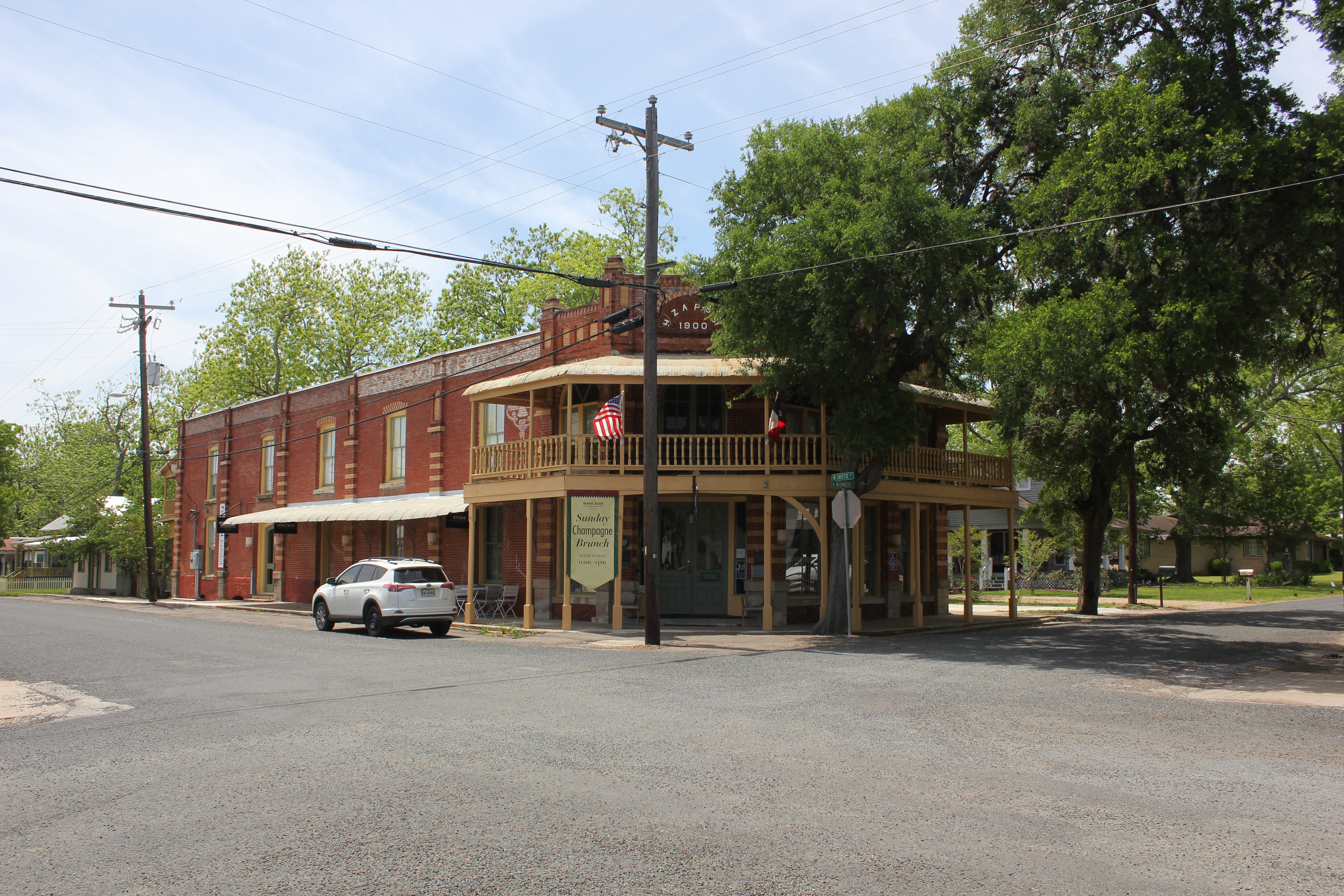
Facade (2018)

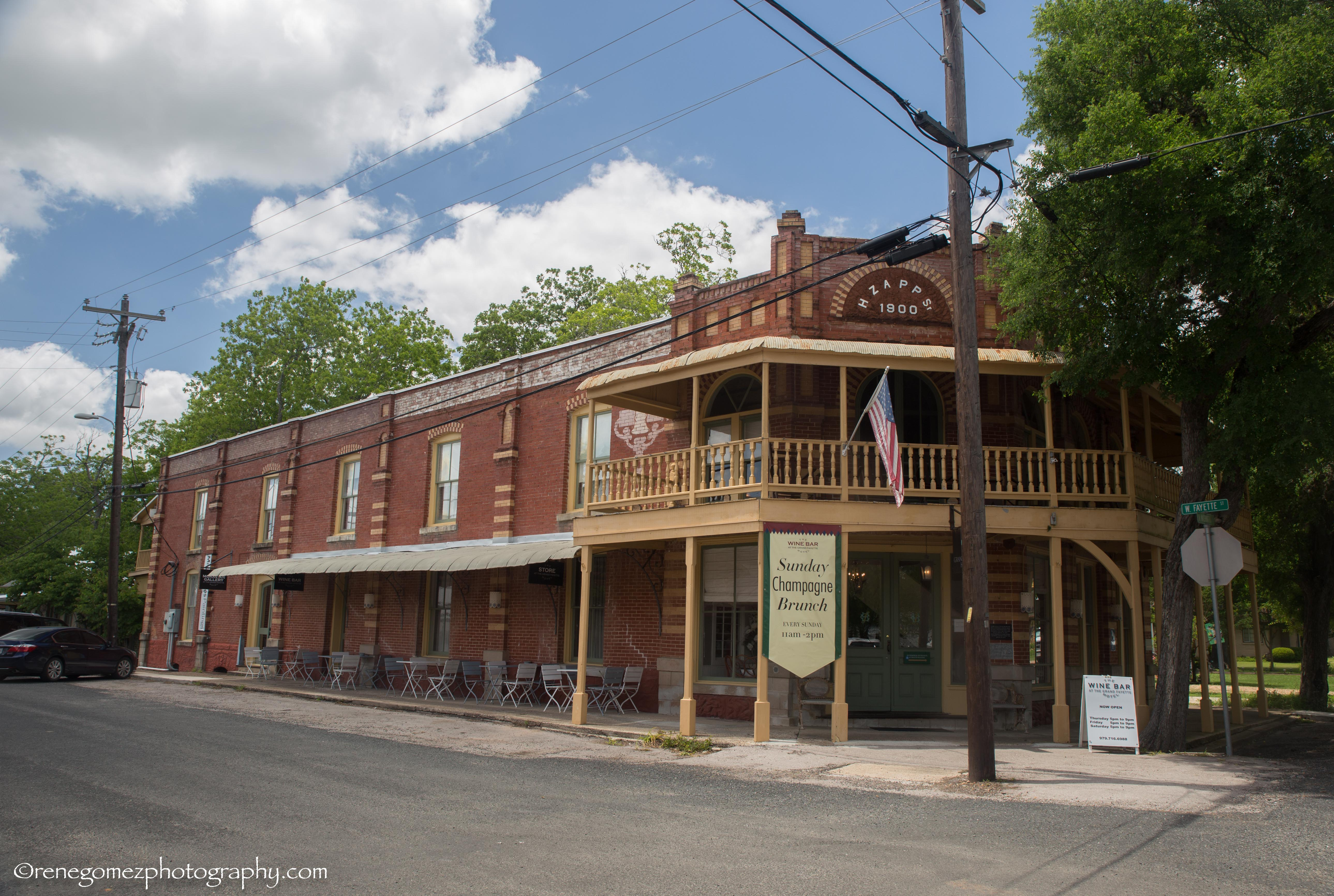
Facade (2019)

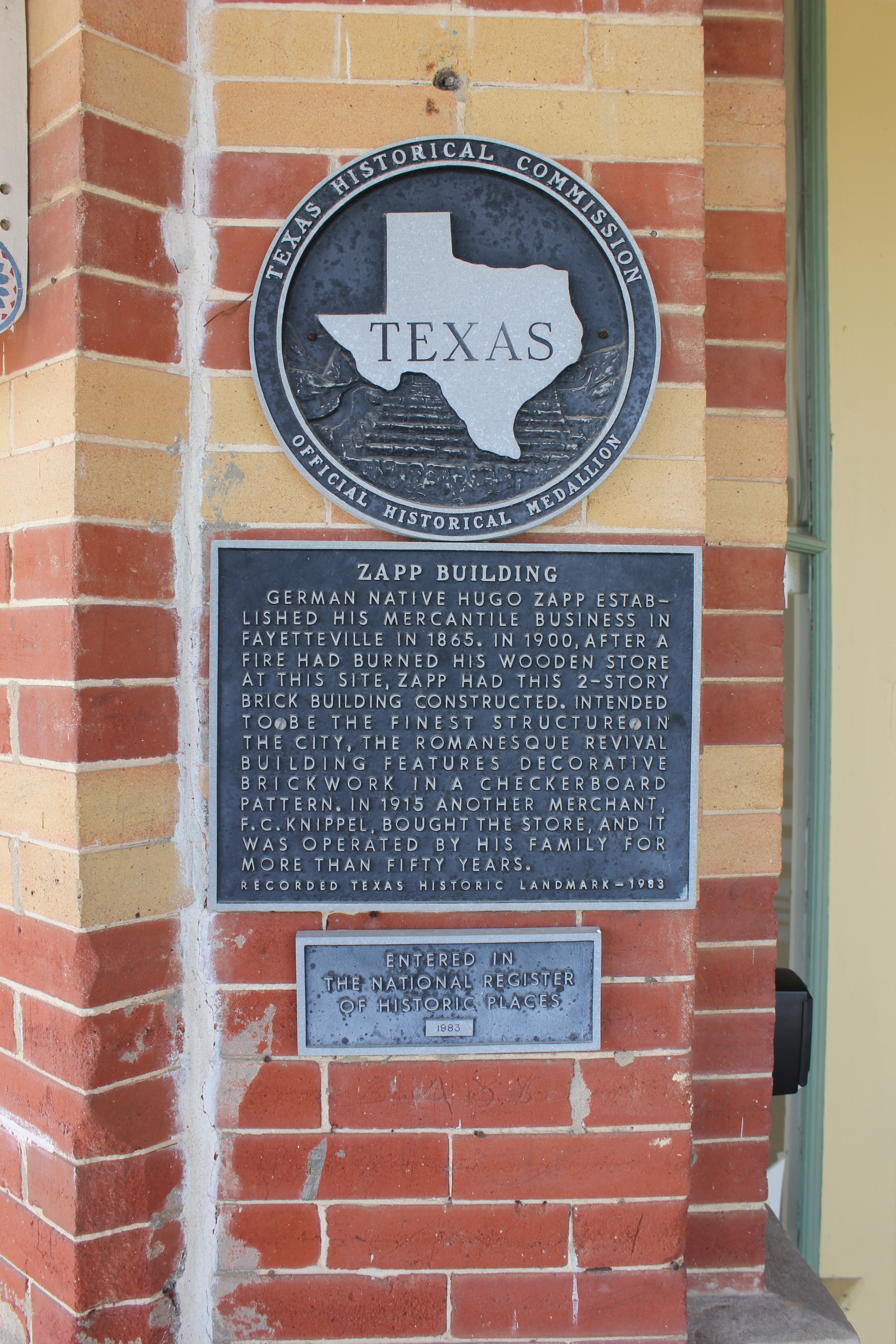
Historical Marker (2018)

== See also ==
- National Register of Historic Places listings in Fayette County, Texas
- List of Recorded Texas Historic Landmarks (Eastland-Gray)
