= Fayetteville High School (Texas) =

Location
- 618 Rusk Street; Fayetteville, Texas 78940-0129; United States; 29.905495°N 96.681396°W

Information
- School type: Public high school
- School district: Fayetteville Independent School District
- Principal: Brynn Lopez
- Teaching staff: 25.84 (FTE)
- Grades: PK-12
- Enrollment: 290 (2023–2024)
- Student to teacher ratio: 11.22
- Colors: Maroon & Gray
- Athletics conference: UIL Class A
- Mascot: Lion
- Website: Fayetteville High School

Fayetteville High School is a public high school located in Fayetteville, Texas (USA). It is part of the Fayetteville Independent School District located in east central Fayette County and classified as a 1A school by the UIL. In 2013, the school was rated "Met Standard" by the Texas Education Agency.

== Athletics ==
The Fayetteville Lions compete in the following sports:

- Baseball
- Basketball
- Cross Country
- Golf
- Softball
- Tennis
- Track and Field
- Volleyball

=== State titles ===
- Baseball
  - 1997(1A), 2012(1A), 2021(1A), 2025(1A)
- Girls Basketball
  - 2004(1A/D1)
- Volleyball
  - 2021(1A)

On February 3, 2026, the Fayetteville Lions set a national record for the most three-pointers made in a single game, hitting 40 shots from beyond the arc in a 120–25 victory over the Buckholts Badgers.
