= Fayette County Reservoir =

- Location within Texas Location within the United States
- Location: Fayette County, near Fayetteville, Texas
- Coordinates: 29°55.76′N 96°44.26′W
- Type: Power station cooling reservoir
- Primary inflows: Cedar Creek
- Primary outflows: Cedar Creek
- Basin countries: United States
- Managing agency: Lower Colorado River Authority
- Built: 1978
- Surface area: 2,400 acres (970 ha)
- Max. depth: 70 ft (21 m)
- Water volume: 71,400 acre⋅ft (88,100,000 m^{3})
- Surface elevation: 390 ft (120 m)

Fayette County Reservoir is a power station cooling reservoir on Cedar Creek in the Colorado River basin, 3 miles west of Fayetteville, Texas and 10 miles east of La Grange, Texas. The reservoir was created in 1978 when a dam was built on the creek to provide a cooling pond for the Fayette Power Project which provides electrical generation to Fayette County and surrounding areas. The dam, lake, and power plant are managed by the Lower Colorado River Authority. There is very little vegetation compared to what can usually be found in fisheries, and some invasive plant species are present. The lake is open to the public for recreational activities, including boating, fishing, camping, and hiking.

Fayette County Reservoir is also known as Lake Fayette.

== Description ==
Fayette County Reservoir is located within the Post Oak Savannah ecoregion in Texas. Habitat in the littoral zone is mainly natural and rocky shoreline. The water level is supplied and maintained by the Colorado River. Its function as a power plant cooling reservoir increases water temperatures throughout the lake. Water clarity is considered normal, and nutrient levels are high. The dam itself is composed of compacted soil approximately 96 ft. high and 15, 259 ft. long.

== History ==
Construction of the dam for Fayette County Reservoir impounded the upstream section of Cedar Creek, turning it into a recharge area where it was previously a groundwater discharge area. Most of the vegetation in the area was removed during construction.

Lake Fayette used to be the site of a small town called Biegel, which was famous for its pickles. Outlines of houses may be visible on fish finders. The Biegel-December House, the Legler Log House, and the Gentner-Kroll-Polasek Farmstead were historic structures present in the construction area, and were relocated prior to construction. Other historic and archaeological sites were present on the construction site, and 25 sites were investigated by the Texas Archaeological Survey. No other structures or artifacts were removed.

== Fish and plant populations ==
Fayette County Reservoir has been stocked with species of fish intended to improve the utility of the reservoir for recreational fishing. Fish present in Fayette County Reservoir include catfish, largemouth bass, and sunfish. Largemouth Bass is considered the most popular sport fishing species in this reservoir, and fish are typically abundant and active between February and June. The Channel Catfish is another important sport fishing species, and their populations are being closely monitored as a result of decreasing abundance. The most abundant prey species in the reservoir are Bluegill, Gizzard Shad, and Threadfin Shad.

The level of overall coverage by aquatic vegetation in Fayette County Reservoir is lower than what is typical for fisheries. A 2012 survey of aquatic vegetation found an invasive plant species, Eurasian watermilfoil, but more recent surveys indicate that it is no longer present, and coverage by other invasive species is low.

== Recreational uses ==
Boating, fishing, and camping are popular recreational uses of the lake. There are boat ramps and piers available to visitors, as well as access to shoreline for fishing. Fishing tournaments are held annually, notably for largemouth bass. There is also a playground, a 3-mile trail connecting Oak Thicket Park and Park Prairie Park, and a nature trail in Oak Thicket Park.
