= Fayetteville Historic District (Fayetteville, Texas) =

Historic district in Texas, United States

- Fayetteville Historical District
- U.S. National Register of Historic Places
- U.S. Historic district
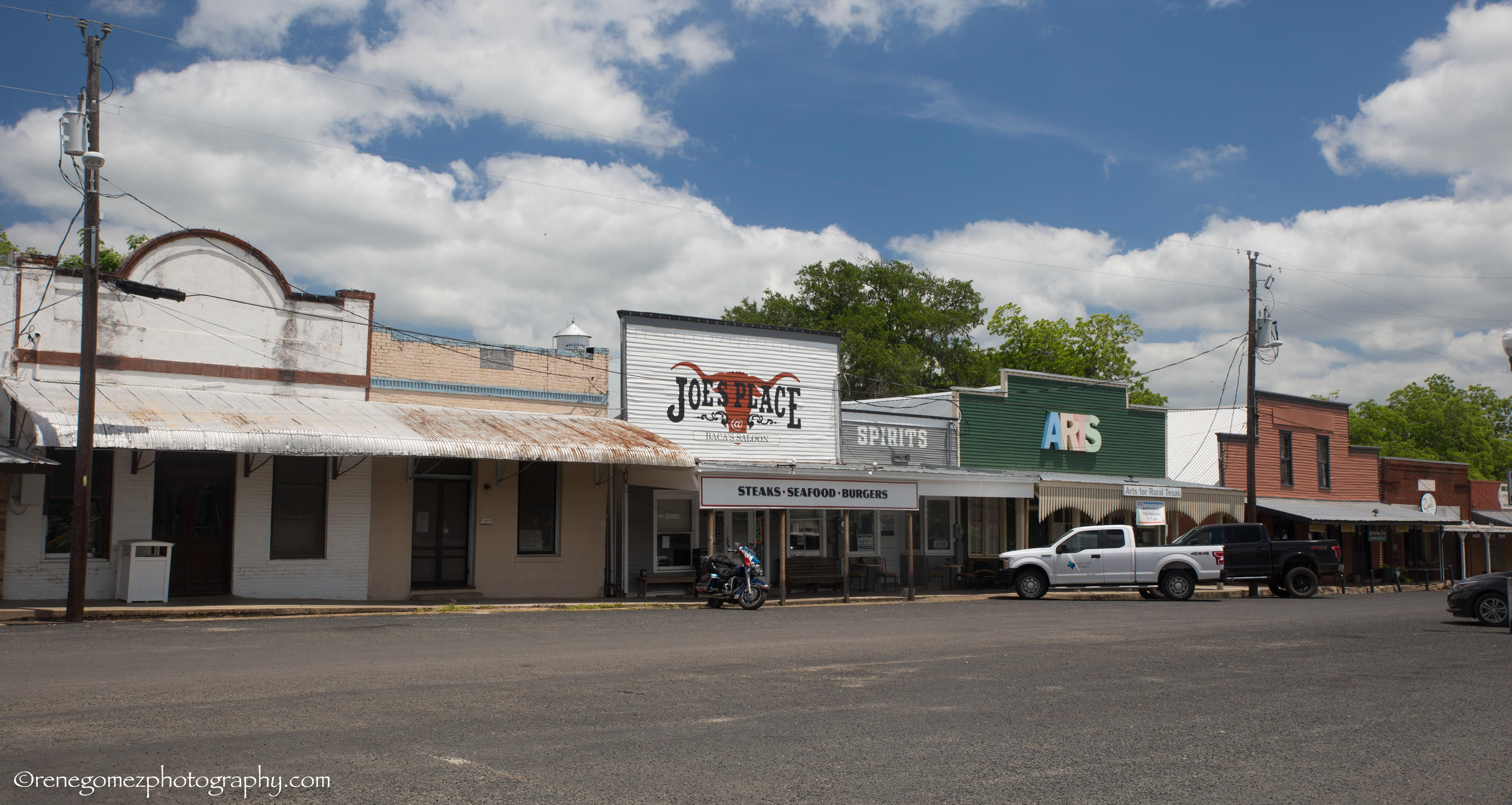
- Town Square along N. Washington St.

- Location within Texas Location within the United States
- Location: Roughly bounded by E. Bell, N. Thompson (FM 1291), E. Fayette, E. Main (SH 159), Post Oak Lane, Fayetteville, Texas
- Coordinates: 29°54′26″N 96°40′26″W
- Area: 153.5 acres (62.1 ha)
- Built: 1853–1958
- Contributing architect: Carl H. Stautz
- Architectural style: Italianate, Queen Anne, Romanesque
- NRHP reference No.: 08000657
- Added to NRHP: 10 July 2008

Fayetteville Historic District is located in Fayetteville, Texas. The small town of Fayetteville is in rural south east central Texas midway between Houston and Austin. The oldest extant building in the district was constructed in 1853. The historic district represents most of the development within town boundaries as indicated by street signs, the boundaries have been drawn to exclude some areas in town occupied primarily by construction from after 1958. The area of the district is 153.5 acres (62.1 ha) and includes 345 properties considered historical and largely intact. An additional 137 properties within district boundaries are not considered for contribution to the historic status of the district. It was added to the National Register of Historic Places (NRHP) on July 10, 2008.

== Fayetteville ==
Fayetteville is 12 miles from the county seat, LaGrange, in a region known as the blackland prairie of south central Texas characterized by soft rolling hills and arable land. Development is concentrated in a compact area and is surrounded by farmland. The boundary between the northeast–southeast grid plan of the town and the open farms is distinct and characteristic of the Czech farmers who have been predominant in the area since the mid 19th century. They followed early German settlers. Development after 1850, when the town was platted, displaced or replaced all the previous improvements.

== Town plan ==
That original plat was 28 blocks with a central town square. As of 2008 the town, with a population of 261, essentially still reflects that platting and its relation to the surrounding farmland. The town square is the central ordinal for directional prefixes (N, S, E, W) and numbering (beginning with hundreds) of street names and addresses. Town streets are uncurbed and typically 25 feet (7.6 m) wide and have at grade drains with metal grills flowing into an underground storm sewer system.

A former precinct courthouse, sits in the town square with extra wide 100-foot (30 m) curbed streets on its borders as specified in the original 1850 plat. Bounded by Main, Washington, Live Oak and Fayette streets the town square is the focus of commercial development. The remainder of the town is primarily residential. Typical commercial construction is wood frame block buildings many featuring false front parapets and awnings. Residential construction is typically modest single family homes on generous lots.

== 1880 courthouse ==
The Fayette County Precinct No. 2 Courthouse, built in 1880 is wood-frame construction with horizontal wood siding and has a simple two story square plan. The south elevation is the facade with simple wood stairs and solid wood panel double doors. Windows are symmetrically placed with three bays on the north and south, and two on the east and west. Construction of the Victorian style building was funded by US$600 (equivalent to $20,017 in 2025) in contributions from the citizens of Fayetteville and an additional US$200 in tax funds from the County Commissioners' Court. Funding for painting the building was raised by holding a ball. A calaboose (holding jail) with two cells was finished in 1887. A clock tower, financed by a ladies club, was added in 1934 in the center of the hipped roof. It is no longer used as a courthouse. Precinct courthouses were quite rare in early Texas and this one was listed as an RTHL in 1997. The other government building, the post office, is not considered historical, dating from the late 1960s.

== Town square and commercial development ==
The town square has five buildings with coursed pressed tin siding in a rough ashlar finish as well as several masonry buildings on the east built to replace wood structures lost to fire in 1893. These are in contrast to the one and two part block wood frame commercial buildings common to the concentrated town center focused tightly on the town square. There are 25 one part block buildings typically featuring a false front parapet wall obscuring a front gable roof giving an impression of greater height to these one story buildings. These false front parapets some stepped and some flat topped are repeated by many buildings facing the town square and throughout the commercial area. Many have awnings extending over the sidewalk suspended from the facade wall or supported by columns, some with signage on a parapet topping the canopy. The facade typically featured a central entrance flanked by windows.

The seven two part commercial block buildings in the district are two stories. Two of them, both fronting the town square featured a store on the first floor and residences for the owner above. They are the Sarrazin Store and Steve's Corner Store. The standard two part block consists of commercial space with a storefront on the first floor and office, storage or residential space upstairs. Most in Fayetteville had canopies or roofs extending over the sidewalk. A good example of the two part block form is the Zapp Building one of the town's few high–style commercial buildings. The red brick building with buff brick accents and a corner entry was built in 1900 to replace an earlier structure lost to fire. It operates as an inn and is listed on the National Register of Historic Places and as a Recorded Texas Historic Landmark.

== Photo gallery ==
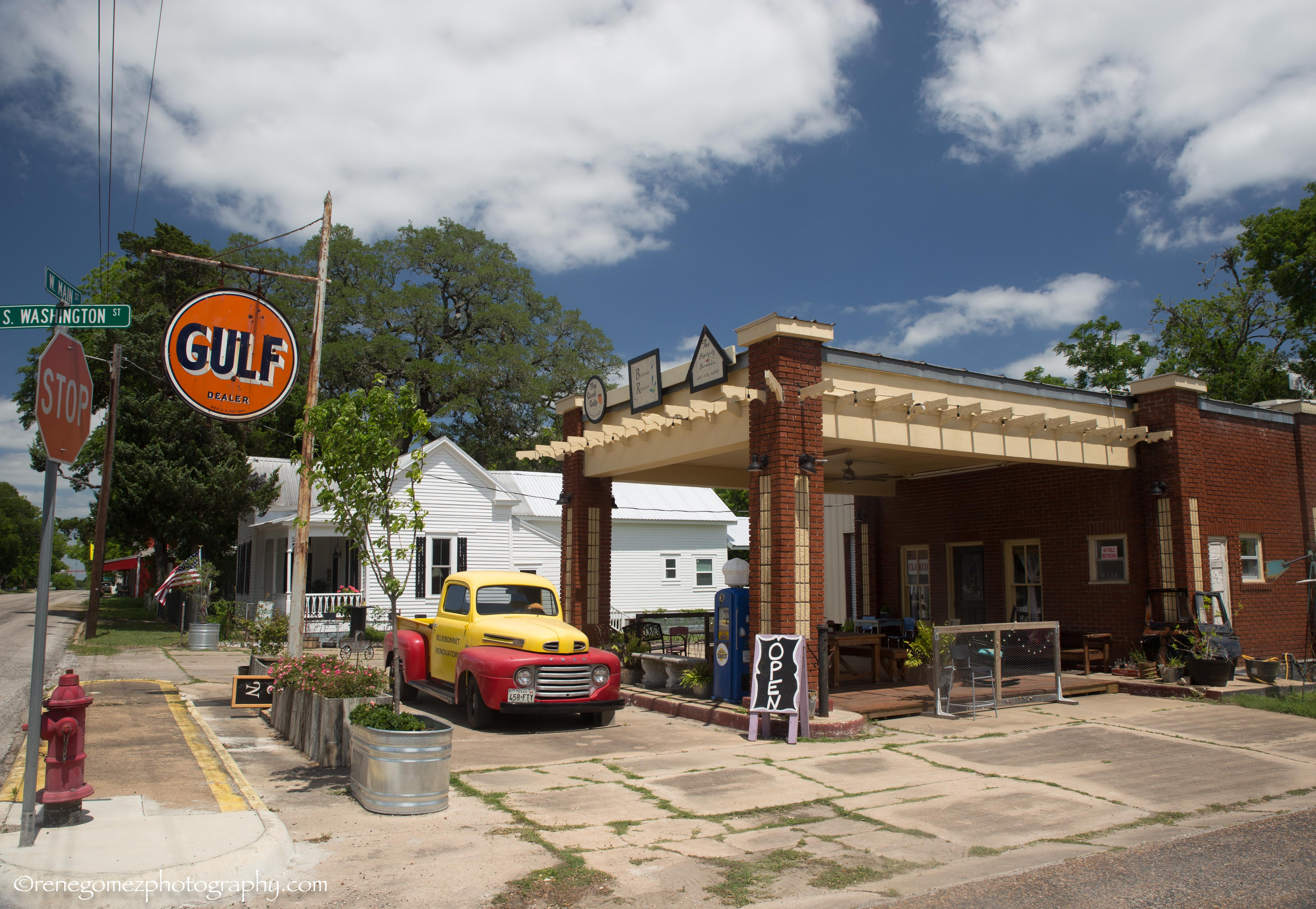

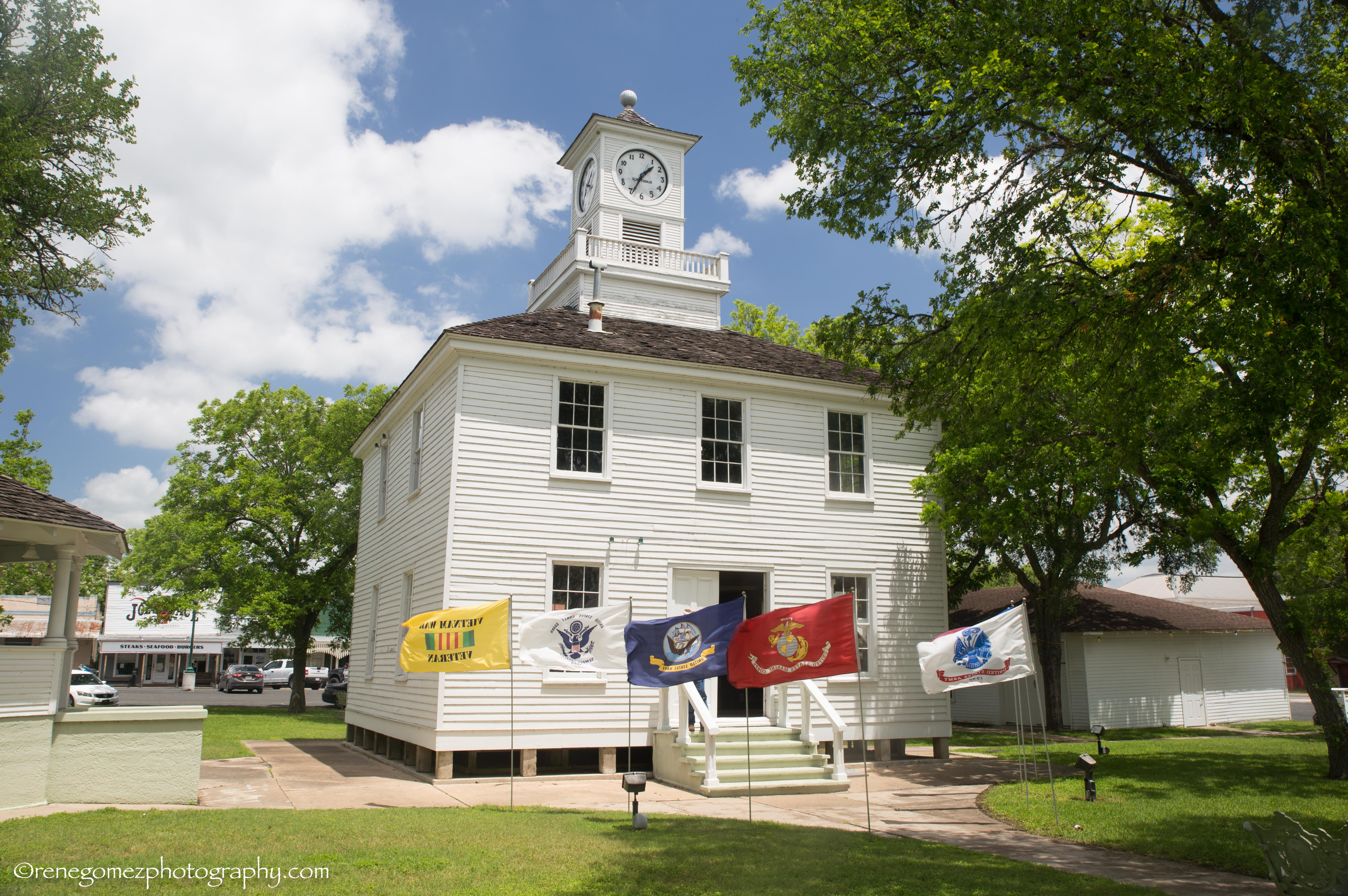

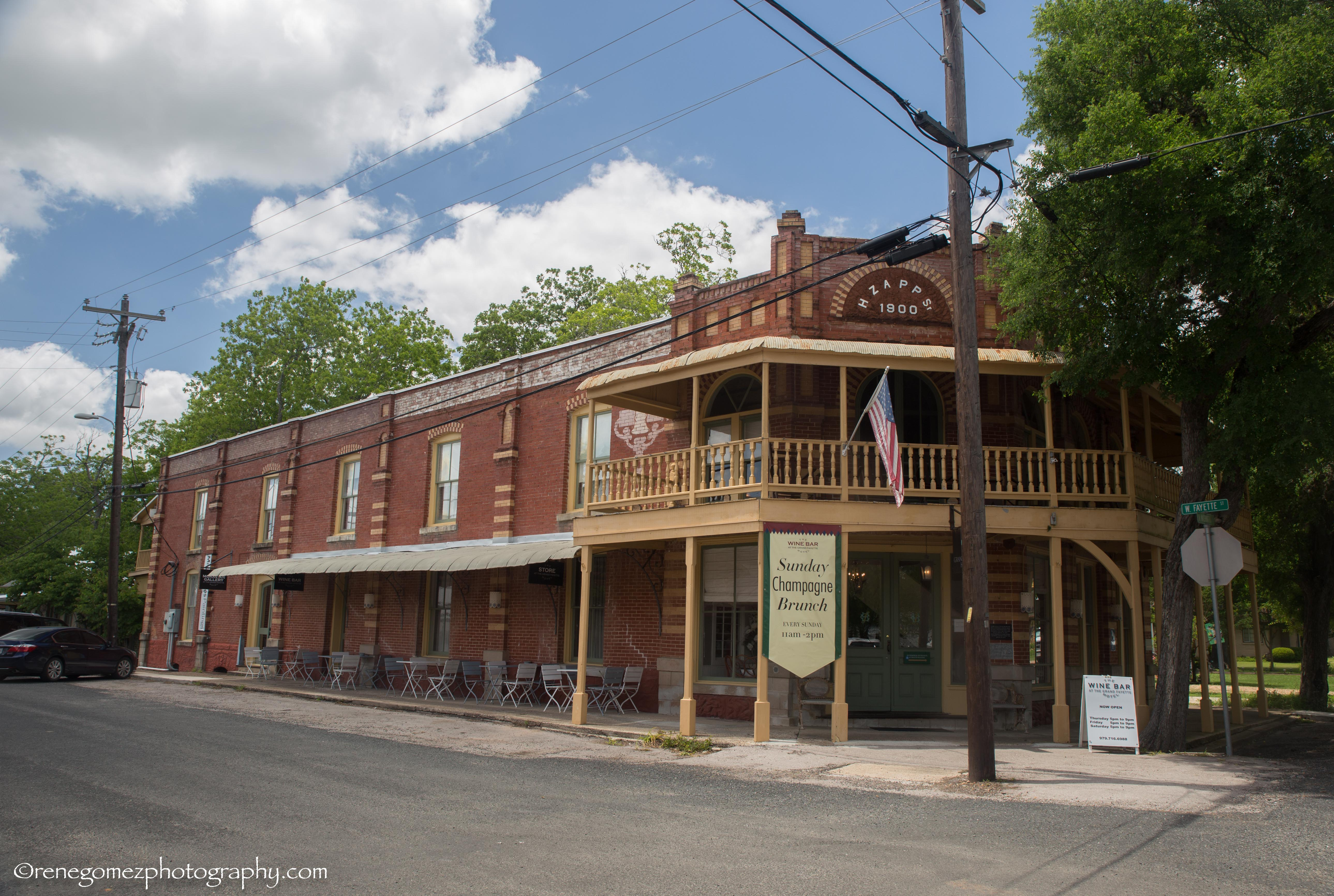

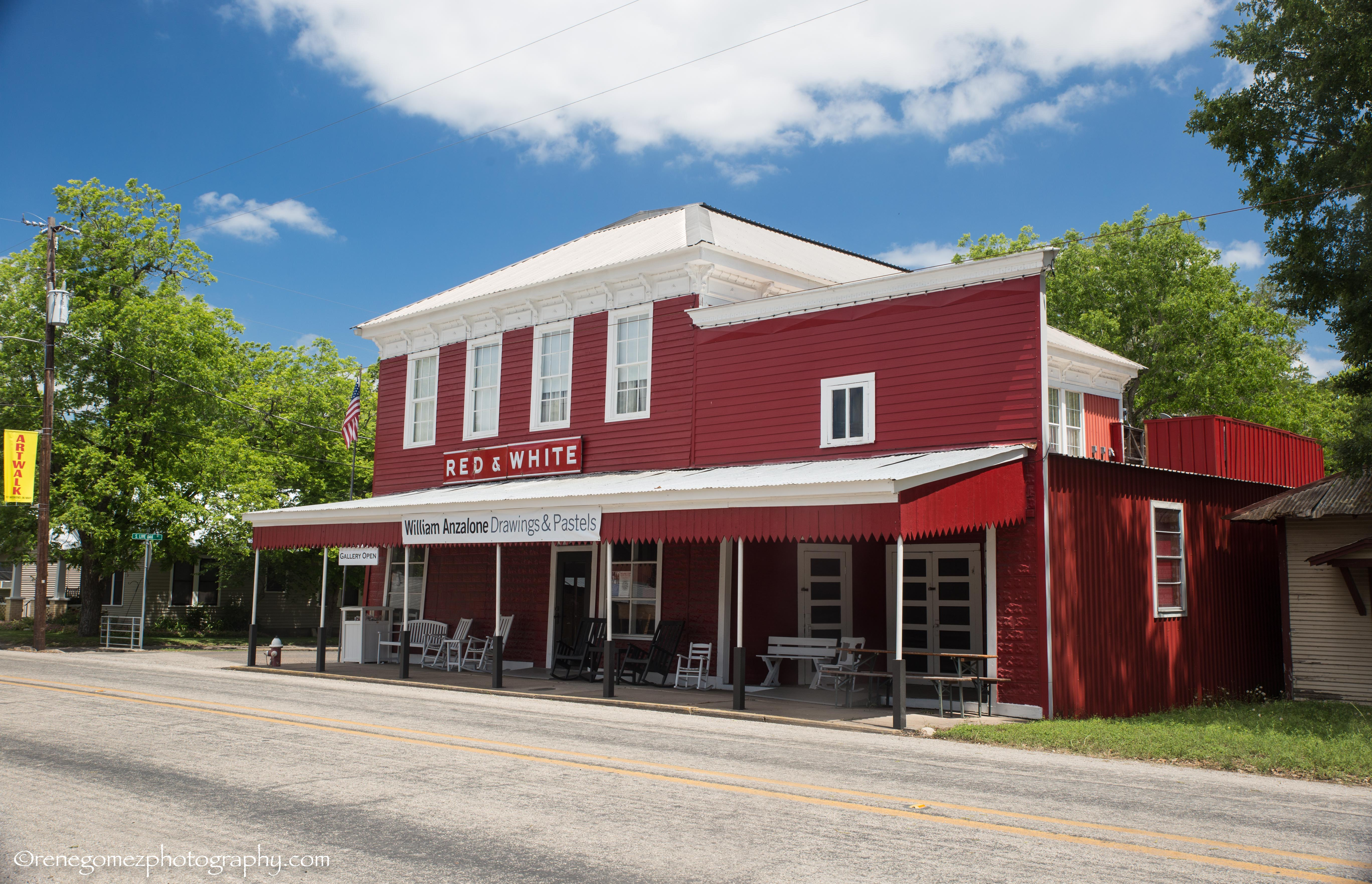

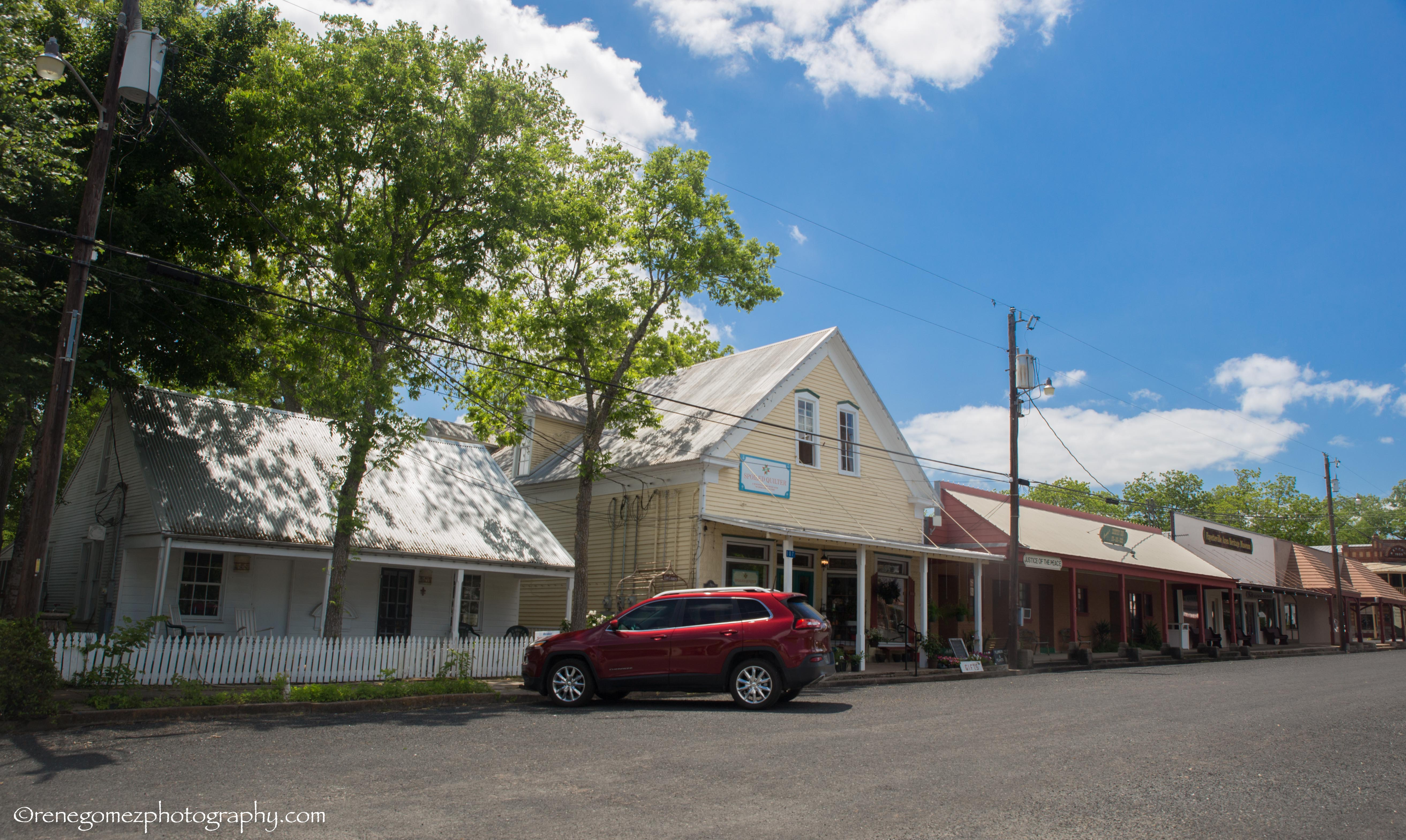

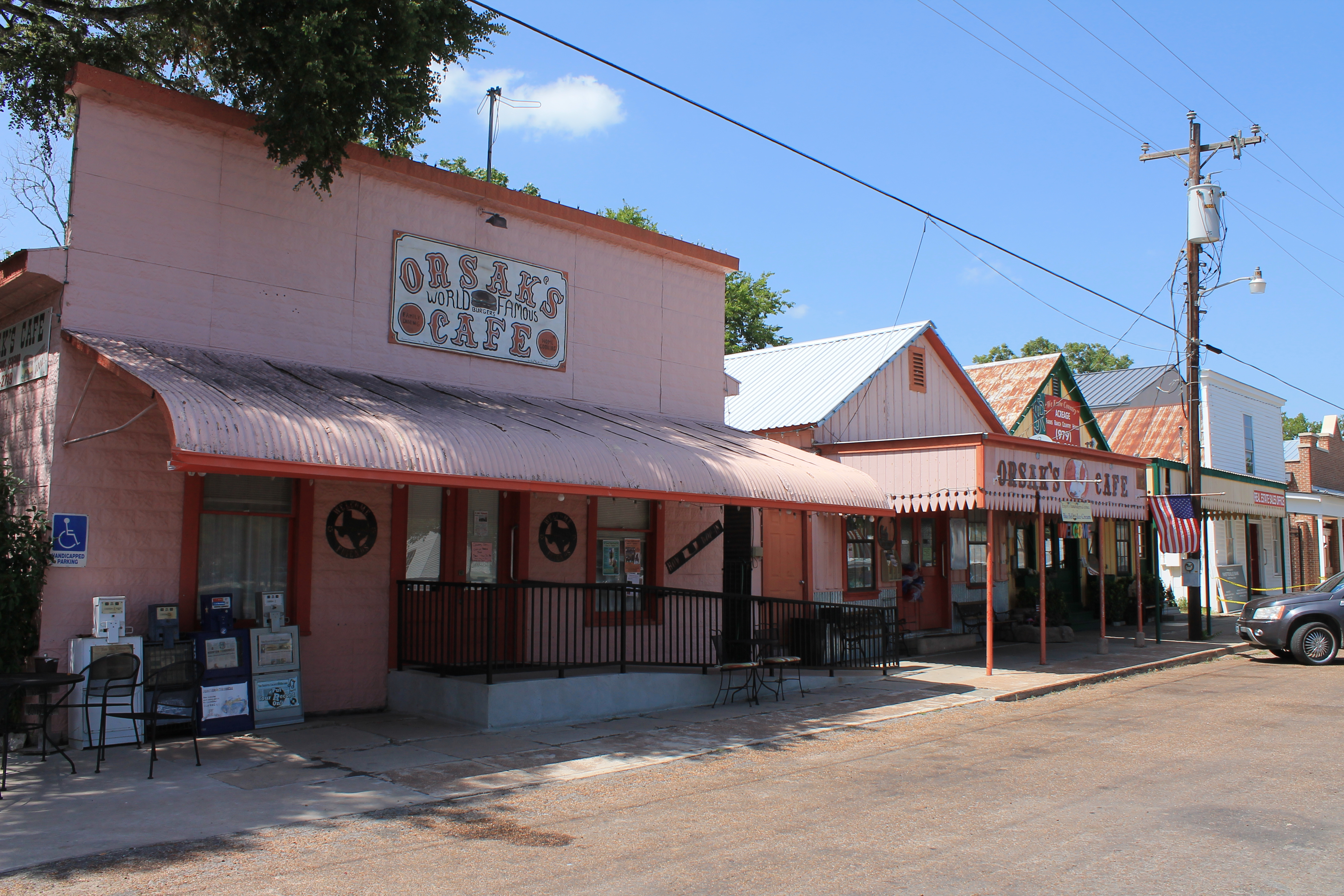

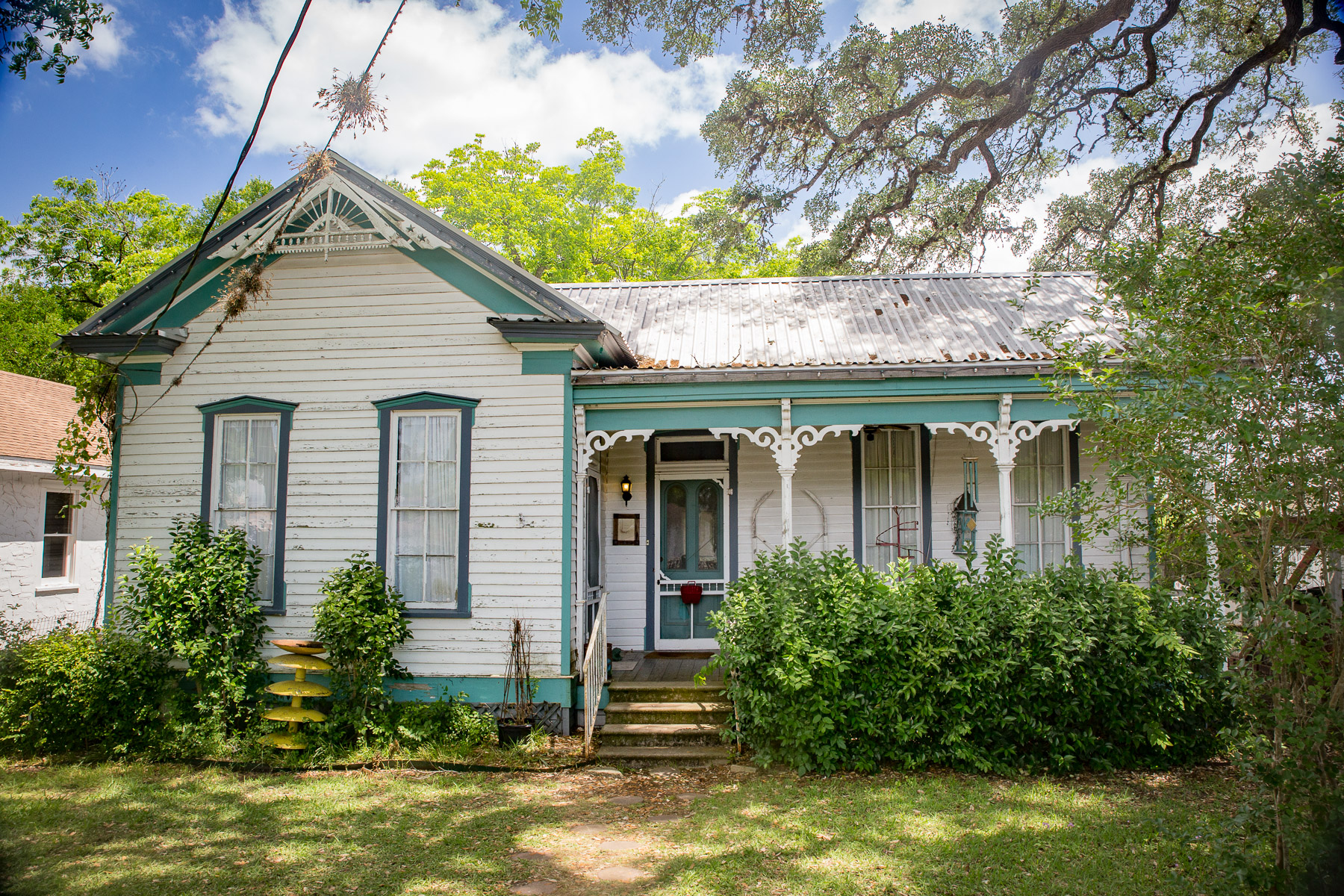

== See also ==
- Historic preservation
- National Register of Historic Places listings in Fayette County, Texas
