= Fayetteville Independent School District =

School district in Texas, United States

Address
- 618 Rusk Street Fayetteville, Texas, 78940; United States

District information
- Grades: PK–12
- Schools: 1
- NCES District ID: 4819140

Students and staff
- Students: 290 (2023–2024)
- Teachers: 25.84 (on an FTE basis)
- Student–teacher ratio: 11.22:1

Other information
- Website: www.fayettevilleisd.net

Fayetteville Independent School District is a public school district based in Fayetteville, Texas (USA). It is located in east central Fayette County and classified as a 1A school by the UIL. The district has three campuses - Fayetteville High (Grades 9-12), Fayetteville Junior High (Grades 6-8), and Fayetteville Elementary (Grades PK-5).

In 2009, the school district was rated "exemplary" by the Texas Education Agency.
