= Fayette Power Project =

Coal-fired power plant in Fayette County, Texas

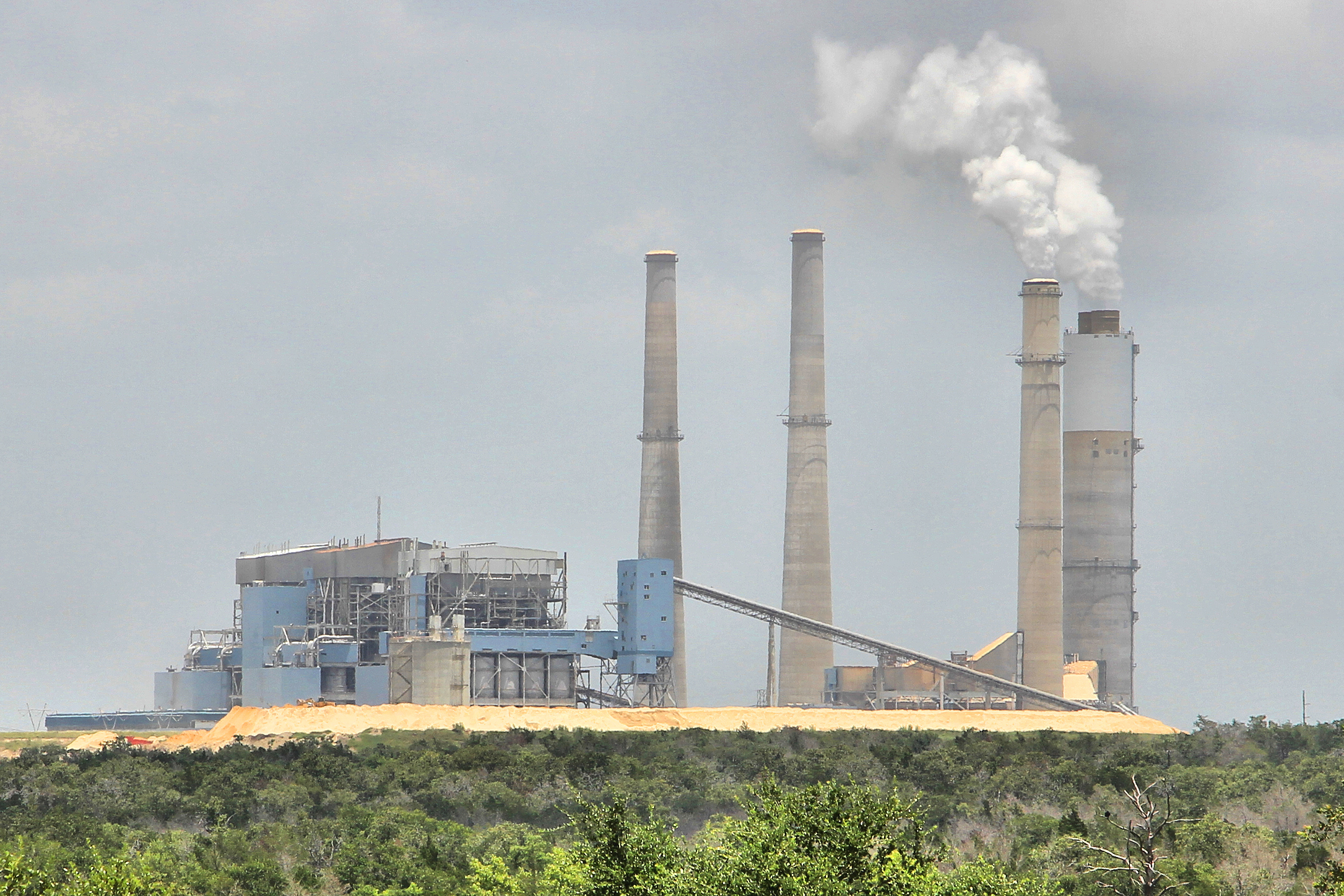
- Country: United States
- Location: Fayette County, near La Grange, Texas
- Coordinates: 29°55′00″N 96°45′06″W
- Status: Operational
- Commission date: Unit 1: 1979; Unit 2: 1980; Unit 3: 1988
- Owners: Austin Energy; Lower Colorado River Authority

Thermal power station
- Primary fuel: Coal
- Cooling source: Fayette County Reservoir

Power generation
- Nameplate capacity: 1,615 MW

External links
- Commons: Related media on Commons

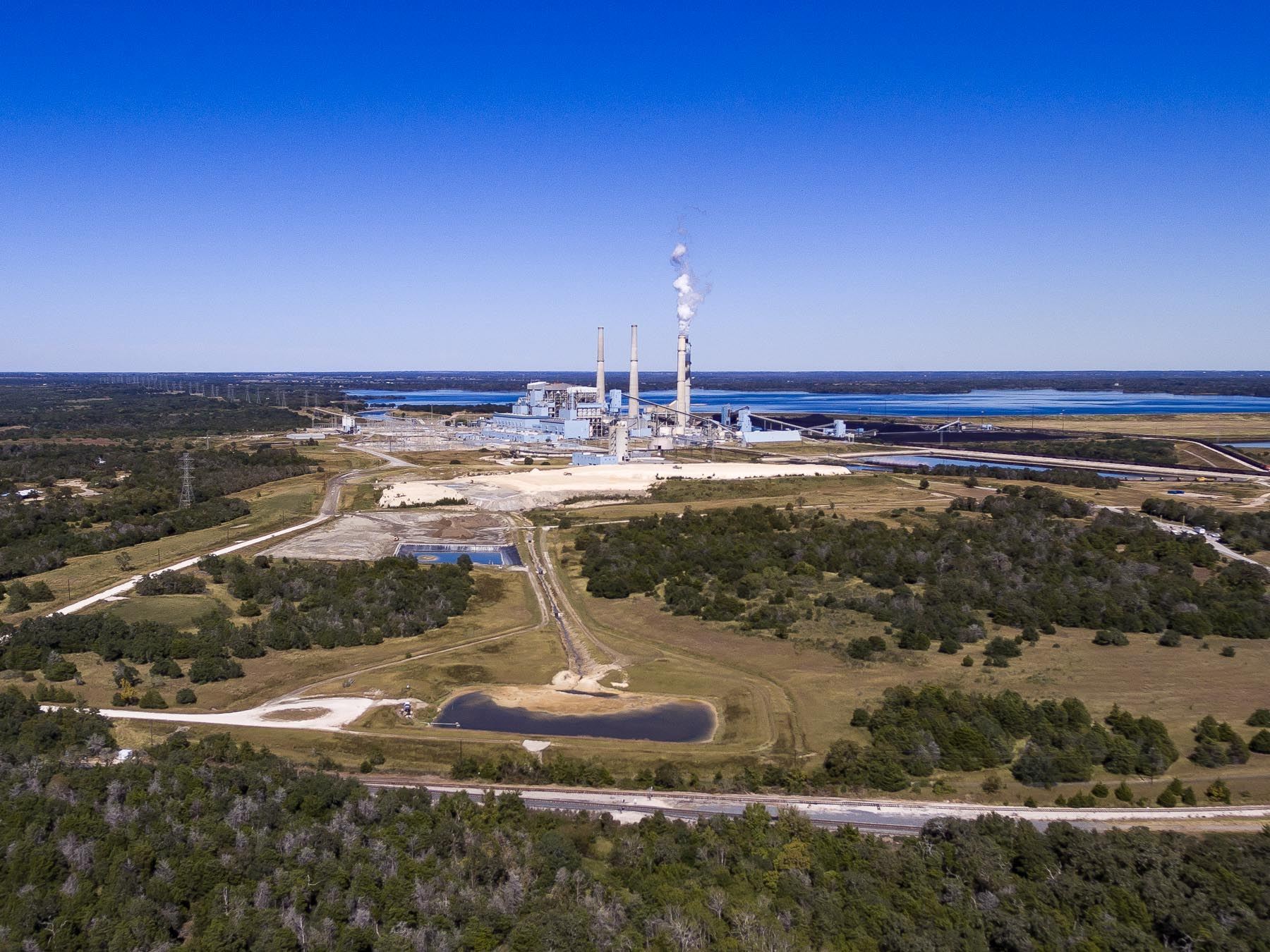

The Fayette Power Project, also known as Sam Seymour Power Plant, is a coal-fired power plant located near La Grange, Texas in Fayette County, Texas. It is owned by Austin Energy and the Lower Colorado River Authority (LCRA) and operated by LCRA.

Three generating units comprise the Fayette Power Project:

- Unit 1, completed in 1979, with a generating capacity of 615 megawatts
- Unit 2, completed in 1980, with a generating capacity of 615 megawatts
- Unit 3, completed in 1988, with a generating capacity of 460 megawatts

The main source of fuel for the Fayette Power Project is low-sulfur coal from the Powder River Basin in Wyoming. Cooling water is provided by the Fayette County Reservoir, a 2,400-acre (970 ha) freshwater reservoir.

== History ==
During the 2021 Texas power crisis, Fayette Power Project was reported to have lost 453MW of generation capacity across Units 1 and 2 on February 17, 2021.

== See also ==
- List of power stations in Texas
