= Fayetteville, Texas =

- City
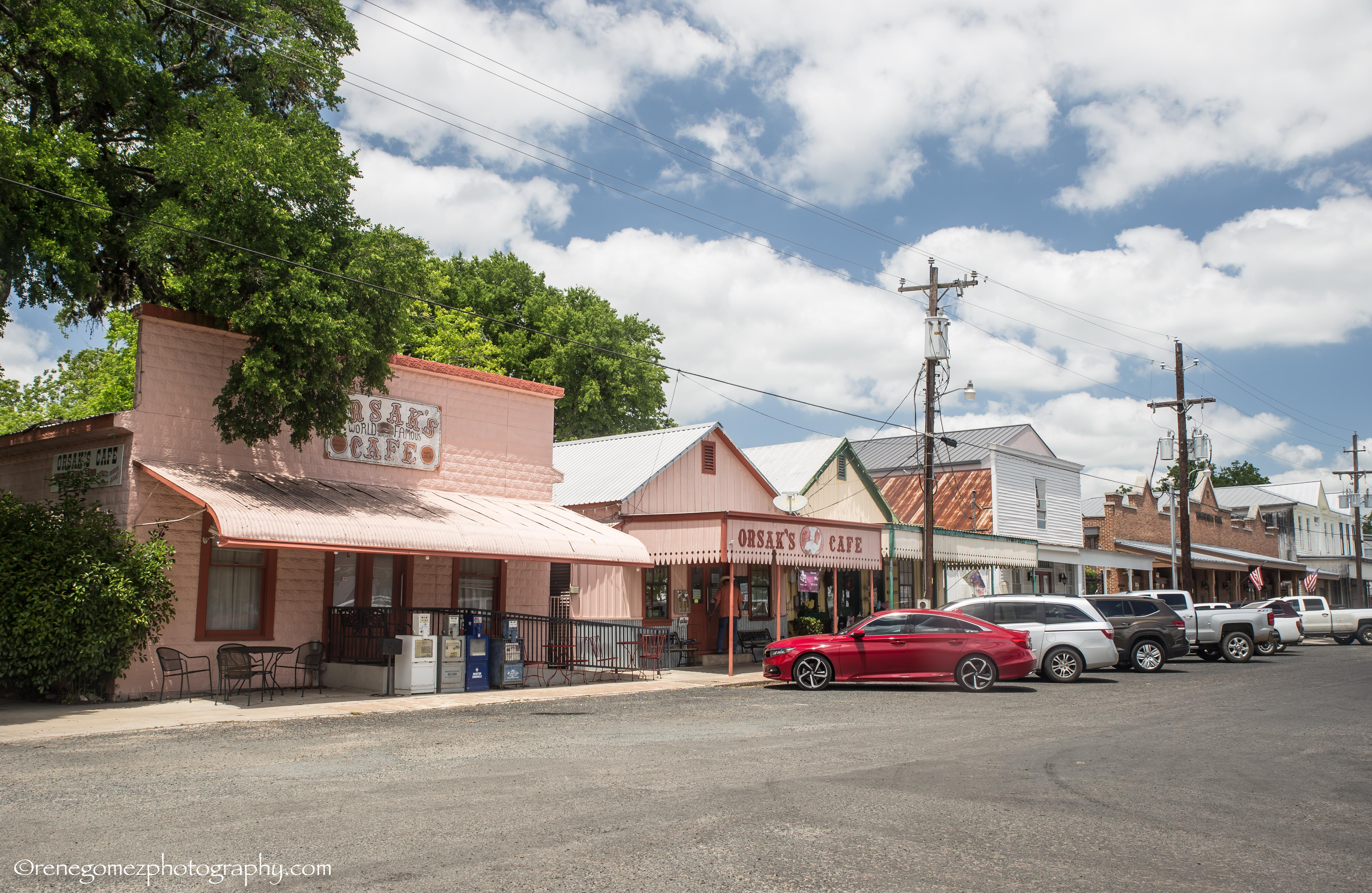
- Downtown Fayetteville, Texas

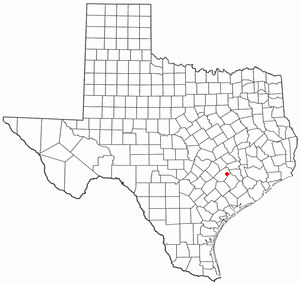
- Location of Fayetteville in Texas

- Coordinates: 29°54′23″N 96°40′33″W
- Country: United States
- State: Texas
- County: Fayette

Area
  - Total: 0.50 sq mi (1.30 km^{2})
  - Land: 0.50 sq mi (1.30 km^{2})
  - Water: 0 sq mi (0.00 km^{2})
- Elevation: 410 ft (120 m)

Population (2020)
  - Total: 246
  - Density: 490/sq mi (189/km^{2})
- Time zone: UTC-6 (Central (CST))
  - Summer (DST): UTC-5 (CDT)
- ZIP code: 78940
- Area code: 979
- FIPS code: 48-25644
- GNIS feature ID: 2410492
- Website: www.fayetteville.texas.gov

Fayetteville is a city in Fayette County, Texas, United States. The population was 246 at the 2020 census.

== History ==
The town is located in an area that was originally granted to Alex Thompson and George Cumberland. Fayetteville's first immigrant settlers were the families headed by John Crier, James Cummins, and James J. Ross, three of the Old Three Hundred. The settlement began at the location of a stagecoach stop on an old road between San Felipe and Bastrop.

Even though Fayette County was named after General Lafayette, the Revolutionary War hero, the community was named in 1844 after Fayetteville, North Carolina, the birthplace of Philip J. Shaver, a prominent citizen who had surveyed the community, named its streets, and donated lots for the Fayetteville Academy and the town's multidenominational Union Church.

Fayetteville was incorporated in 1882.

The town made national news during World War I. As reprinted by Stars and Stripes in its March 15, 1918 issue, the town's mayor, W. C. Langlotz, and ten of the town's citizens were charged with espionage. They were arrested following the display of the flag of the German Empire over the entryway of the Germania club in Fayetteville. The mayor said the flag had been displayed by mistake and the group pleaded "not guilty".

The majority of the area within the town boundaries was designated the Fayetteville Historic District and listed on the National Register of Historic Places on July 10, 2008.

== Geography ==
Fayetteville is located in eastern Fayette County. Texas State Highway 159 passes through the center of town, leading northeast 12 miles (19 km) to Industry and northwest, then southwest a total of 16 miles (26 km) to La Grange, the county seat. Houston is 85 miles (137 km) to the east via secondary highways and Interstate 10, while Austin is 80 miles (130 km) to the northwest via highways 159 and 71.

According to the United States Census Bureau, the city has a total area of 0.50 square miles (1.3 km^{2}), none of which is covered with water. Lake Fayette, a reservoir constructed adjacent to Fayette Power Project, is 4 miles (6 km) west of town and features LCRA's Oak Thicket and Park Prairie Parks.

== Demographics ==
Historical population
Census	Pop.	Note	%±
1870	319		—
1890	269		—
1910	274		—
1920	390		42.3%
1930	437		12.1%
1940	445		1.8%
1950	462		3.8%
1960	394		−14.7%
1970	400		1.5%
1980	356		−11.0%
1990	283		−20.5%
2000	261		−7.8%
2010	258		−1.1%
2020	246		−4.7%
U.S. Decennial Census

=== 2020 census ===
As of the 2020 census, Fayetteville had a population of 246. The median age was 61.9 years. 12.2% of residents were under the age of 18 and 43.5% of residents were 65 years of age or older. For every 100 females there were 83.6 males, and for every 100 females age 18 and over there were 86.2 males age 18 and over.

0.0% of residents lived in urban areas, while 100.0% lived in rural areas.

There were 134 households in Fayetteville, of which 15.7% had children under the age of 18 living in them. Of all households, 53.0% were married-couple households, 16.4% were households with a male householder and no spouse or partner present, and 25.4% were households with a female householder and no spouse or partner present. About 32.8% of all households were made up of individuals and 17.1% had someone living alone who was 65 years of age or older.

There were 213 housing units, of which 37.1% were vacant. The homeowner vacancy rate was 5.6% and the rental vacancy rate was 5.7%.

Racial composition as of the 2020 census
Race	Number	Percent
White	221	89.8%
Black or African American	2	0.8%
American Indian and Alaska Native	0	0.0%
Asian	0	0.0%
Native Hawaiian and Other Pacific Islander	0	0.0%
Some other race	4	1.6%
Two or more races	19	7.7%
Hispanic or Latino (of any race)	10	4.1%

=== 2000 census ===
As of the census of 2000, there were 261 people, 120 households, and 71 families residing in the city. The population density was 602 inhabitants per square mile (232/km^{2}). There were 183 housing units at an average density of 422 per square mile (163/km^{2}). The racial makeup of the city was 96.55% White, 3.07% African American, and 0.38% Asian. Hispanic or Latino of any race were 1.53% of the population.

There were 120 households, out of which 20.8% had children under the age of 18 living with them, 48.3% were married couples living together, 10.8% had a female householder with no husband present, and 40.8% were non-families. 35.8% of all households were made up of individuals, and 24.2% had someone living alone who was 65 years of age or older. The average household size was 2.17 and the average family size was 2.89.

In the city, the population was spread out, with 19.5% under the age of 18, 7.7% from 18 to 24, 20.7% from 25 to 44, 24.5% from 45 to 64, and 27.6% who were 65 years of age or older. The median age was 46 years. For every 100 females, there were 74.0 males. For every 100 females age 18 and over, there were 72.1 males.

The median income for a household in the city was $27,639, and the median income for a family was $31,667. Males had a median income of $26,250 versus $18,125 for females. The per capita income for the city was $13,916. About 8.0% of families and 13.2% of the population were below the poverty line, including 37.5% of those under the age of eighteen and 12.7% of those 65 or over.

== Education ==
The city is served by the Fayetteville Independent School District.
