= List of place names of Spanish origin in the United States =

As a result of former Spanish and, later, Mexican sovereignty over lands that are now part of the United States, there are many places in the country, mostly in the southwest, with names of Spanish origin. Florida and Louisiana also were at times under Spanish control, as were California, Utah, Nevada, Arizona, New Mexico, Texas, and portions of western Colorado. There are also several places in the United States with Spanish names as a result of other factors. Some of these names have retained archaic Spanish spellings.

== Authenticity and origin ==
Not all Spanish place name etymologies in the United States originate from the Spanish colonial period or from the Spanish language. Spanish-sounding place names are classified into four categories:

- Colonial: Spanish names that were given during the Spanish colonial period, or adaptations of names originally given in the colonial period to the same place or to nearby related places. (Ex: Los Angeles, Salamanca, or California)
- Post-colonial: Spanish place names that have no history of being used during the colonial period for the place in question or for nearby related places. (Ex: Lake Buena Vista, Florida, named in 1969 after a street in Burbank, California)
- Non-Spanish: Place names originating from non-Spaniards or in non-historically Spanish areas.
- Faux: Fabricated Spanish place names, typically by non-Spanish speakers. (Ex: Sierra Vista)

== States ==
- Arizona Either from árida zona, meaning "Arid Zone", or from a Spanish word of Basque origin meaning "The Good Oak"
- California (from the name of a fictional island country in Las sergas de Esplandián, a popular Spanish chivalric romance by Garci Rodríguez de Montalvo)
- Colorado (meaning "red [colored]", "ruddy" or "colored" in masculine form. Named after Colorado City; now called Old Colorado City.)
- Florida Meaning land of flowers, Florida's verdant landscape was discovered by Ponce de León on Easter Sunday. The Pascua Florida holiday in early April commemorates this discovery, during the season when flowers are abundant across Florida.
- Montana from Latinized Spanish meaning "mountainous", also in Spanish "montaña" is the name of "mountain"
- Nevada comes from the Spanish Sierra Nevada (which is also a mountain range in Spain), meaning snowy mountain range (Nevada is the Spanish feminine form of snowy).
- New Mexico, named after the Valley of Mexico.
- Oregon comes from "Orejón", "big ear" or could come from "Aragón".
- Texas, from the Spanish name for the Caddo, derived from the word táyshaʼ meaning 'friend'.
- Utah derives from the Spanish name given to the Ute People by early explorers to the area. The Utes refer to themselves as Noochee, which in Spanish was changed to Yuta.

== Territories ==
- Northern Mariana Islands (after queen Mariana, regent at the time)
- Puerto Rico (Spanish for "Rich Port")
- US Virgin Islands (Christopher Columbus named the Virgin Islands after Santa Ursula y las Once mil Virgenes (English: St. Ursula and the 11,000 Virgins), shortened to las Vírgenes (the Virgins))

== Counties and parishes ==
- Alameda County, California ("Boulevard with Poplars")
- Alamosa County, Colorado ("Shaded with Poplars or Cottonwoods")
- Amador County, California (named for José María Amador, amador is a Spanish word for "lover", not widely used)
- Angelina County, Texas (From "Angelina," a Spanish given name. Its English equivalent is "Angeline")
- Aransas County, Texas (indirectly named after the Sanctuary of Arantzazu in Spain, a name of Basque origin)
- Archuleta County, Colorado (From "Archuleta," a Spanish surname)
- Atascosa County, Texas ("Boggy")
- Baca County, Colorado (named in honor of pioneer and Colorado territorial legislator Felipe Baca)
- Bandera County, Texas ("Flag")
- Bastrop County, Texas
- Bernalillo County, New Mexico
- Bexar County, Texas (Béxar is an ancient form for Béjar)
- Blanco County, Texas ("White")
- Bosque County, Texas ("Forest")
- Brazos County, Texas ("Arms")
- Buena Vista County, Iowa ("Good View")
- Calaveras County, California (named after the Calaveras River; Spanish word for "Skulls")
- Cerro Gordo County, Iowa ("Fat/large Mountain")
- Chaves County, New Mexico (similar to "llaves"-"Keys" and surname)
- Cimarron County, Oklahoma (maroon)
- Colusa County, California (from two Mexican land grants; Coluses (1844) and Colus (1845))
- Comal County, Texas
- Concho County, Texas ("shell")
- Conejos County, Colorado (named after the Conejos River meaning "Rabbits")
- Contra Costa County, California ("Opposite coast" or "back coast" in Spanish; in reference to its location in the San Francisco Bay Area)
- Costilla County, Colorado (named after the Costilla River, meaning "Little Coast" or "Rib")
- DeSoto County, Florida (named after the Spanish explorer Hernando de Soto)
- DeSoto County, Mississippi (named after the Spanish explorer Hernando de Soto)
- Del Norte County, California ("Northern" in Spanish, also the northernmost county in California. This county was actually named and pioneered by portuguese settlers, and is pronounced differently than would be expected in Spanish)
- Dolores County, Colorado (derived from "Nuestra Señora de los Dolores", Spanish name for Our Lady of Sorrows)
- Doña Ana County, New Mexico (Mrs. Anne)
- El Dorado County, California (From the mythical El Dorado, The Gilded One, significant to El Dorado County's importance in the California Gold Rush)
- El Paso County, Colorado ("The step" or "the pass")
- El Paso County, Texas ("The step" or "the pass")
- Escambia County, Florida (named for the Escambia River, whose name comes from a Spanish word for "barter" or "trade")
- Esmeralda County, Nevada ("Emerald")
- Fresno County, California (From Fresno Creek. In Spanish, fresno means "ash tree".)
- Frio County, Texas ("Cold")
- Garza County, Texas (named in honor to the family of landowner José Antonio de la Garza).
- Gonzales County, Texas (surname González)
- Guadalupe County, Texas
- Hernando County, Florida (named after Spanish explorer Hernando de Soto)
- Hidalgo County, New Mexico (after Villa de Guadalupe Hidalgo, where the Treaty of Guadalupe Hidalgo was signed)
- Hidalgo County, Texas (after Miguel Hidalgo y Costilla, Mexican national hero)
- Huerfano County, Colorado (named for the Huerfano Butte, a local landmark. From the Spanish huérfano, meaning orphan)
- Las Animas County, Colorado (named after the Animas River, derived from Río de las Ánimas Perdidas, which means "River of the Lost Souls")
- La Paz County, Arizona ("Peace")
- La Plata County, Colorado (called so for La Plata River, in Colorado. From the Spanish plata, meaning "silver")
- Lampasas County, Texas
- Laredo, Texas ("scree") (Laredo city in Cantabria)
- Lavaca County, Texas ("La vaca", literally "the cow")
- Leon County, Florida (named for Spanish explorer Juan Ponce de León; it is his surname, which means lion, as well as the name of a Spanish city, León, Spain
- Leon County, Texas
- Los Alamos County, New Mexico ("The white poplars")
- Los Angeles County, California (Spanish for "the Angels", from one of the 28 settlements founded by the Spanish, El Pueblo de Nuestra Señora la Reina de los Ángeles del Río de Porciúncula)
- Madera County, California ("Wood" or "Timber")
- Matagorda County, Texas ("Fat shrub")
- Maricopa County, Arizona
- Mariposa County, California ("Butterfly")
- Medina County, Texas (from Arabic "town, city", surname and cities in Spain)
- Mendocino County, California (from Cape Mendocino, named probably for either Antonio de Mendoza or Lorenzo Suárez de Mendoza, viceroys of New Spain)
- Mesa County, Colorado (table)
- Merced County, California (from the Merced River, a shortened version of the original name El Río de Nuestra Señora de la Merced (River of Our Lady of Mercy); named in 1806 by an expedition headed by Gabriel Moraga)
- Monterey County, California (from Monterey Bay—the name is composed of the Spanish words Monte ("Hill") and Rey ("King") in spanish Monterrey, historically because the viceroy of New Spain (Mexico) that supported the expedition of California, was from Monterrey, Galicia, Spain)
- Mora County, New Mexico (Blackberry or Moor woman)
- Natrona County, Wyoming ("Natron")
- Navarro County, Texas (it could come either from the surname "Navarro", or from the Spanish region of Navarre)
- Nevada County, California ("Snowy")
- New Madrid County, Missouri (called so after the Spanish capital Madrid)
- Nueces County, Texas (named after the Nueces River, meaning "nuts", derived from pecan nuts)
- Otero County, Colorado (the county was named for Miguel Antonio Otero (born 1829), one of the founders of the town of La Junta and a member of a prominent Hispanic family)
- Otero County, New Mexico (named for Miguel Antonio Otero (born 1829) whose son Miguel Antonio Otero (born 1859) who was a New Mexico territorial governor)
- Palo Alto County, Iowa - (of Spanish "tall stick"; It is named for the first battlefield victory in the Mexican–American War).
- Palo Pinto County, Texas ("Colored stick")
- Pecos County, Texas ("freckles")
- Pinellas County, Florida (named after "La Punta de Piñal de Jimenez", which means "Jimenez's Point of Pines", after the entrance to Tampa Bay by Spanish explorers in 1757)
- Plumas County, California (for the Feather River. Plumas is the Spanish word for feathers.)
- Pueblo County, Colorado (village)
- Presidio County, Texas ("Prison")
- Refugio County, Texas ("Shelter")
- Rio Arriba County, New Mexico ("Upstream", referring to the stream of a river)
- Rio Grande County, Colorado ("Big River")
- Sabine County, Texas (tree)
- Sacramento County, California (from the Sacramento River, itself named for the Santísimo Sacramento (Spanish for Most Holy Sacrament), a reference to the Eucharist)
- San Augustine County, Texas (Presidio de San Agustín de Ahumada)
- San Benito County, California (in honor of San Benedicto (Saint Benedict); "Benito" is the diminutive of Benedicto)
- San Bernardino County, California (Saint Bernardino of Siena)
- St. Bernard Parish, Louisiana (called so after St. Bernard, the patron saint of Spanish colonial governor of Louisiana in 1780s Bernardo de Gálvez).
- San Diego County, California (from the city of San Diego, itself named after Saint Didacus of Alcalá, or San Diego de Alcalá in Spanish)
- Sandoval County, New Mexico (Named for the Sandoval family, prominent seventeenth-century Spanish landowners)
- San Francisco County, California (from the city of San Francisco, itself named after Francis of Assisi (1181–1226), a Roman Catholic saint and founder of the Order of Friars Minor (Franciscans))
- San Jacinto County, Texas (for Saint Hyacinth)
- San Joaquin County, California (for Saint Joachim)
- San Juan County, Colorado (for Saint John)
- San Juan County, New Mexico (for Saint John)
- San Juan County, Utah (named after the San Juan River, meaning "St. John")
- San Juan County, Washington (named for Count Juan Vicente de Güemes of Revillagigedo, Viceroy of New Spain)
- San Luis Obispo County, California (for St. Louis, the Bishop)
- San Mateo County, California (for Saint Matthew)
- San Miguel County, Colorado (from the San Miguel River in Colorado)
- San Miguel County, New Mexico (for Saint Michael)
- San Patricio County, Texas (for Saint Patrick)
- San Saba County, Texas
- Sanpete County, Utah, a nickname related to San Pedro, allegedly given to a Native American by the Domínguez–Escalante expedition in the 1770s
- Santa Ana, California (for Saint Anne)
- Santa Barbara County, California (for Saint Barbara)
- Santa Clara County, California (for Saint Clare, for the Santa Clara Valley and the mission town of Santa Clara)
- Santa Fe County, New Mexico (Saint Faith)
- Santa Cruz County, Arizona ("Holy/Sacred Cross")
- Santa Cruz County, California (Spanish for "Holy/Sacred Cross")
- Santa Rosa County, Florida (named after Santa Rosa Island, which means "Saint Rose")
- Sebastian County, Arkansas
- Sierra County, California ("Mountain range")
- Solano County, California (the county derives its name directly from an Amerindian Chief, Chief Solano of the Suisun people, a Native American tribe of the region and Vallejo's close ally. The Chief was given the Spanish name Francisco Solano during baptism at the Catholic Mission, and is named after the Spanish Franciscan missionary, Father Francisco Solano. "Solano" is a common surname in the north of Spain, especially in Navarra, Zaragoza, and La Rioja)
- Stanislaus County, California (named after the Stanislaus River which is named after Chief Estanislaõ who was named after the Polish Saint Stanislaus)
- Tooele County, Utah (originates from "tule", a Spanish word of Aztec origin meaning "bulrush")
- Utah County, Utah (from the Spanish name Yuta, given to the Ute People by early explorers to the area.)
- Uvalde County, Texas (Named after Juan de Ugalde)
- Valencia County, New Mexico (Spanish city of Valencia)
- Val Verde County, Texas (Valverde)
- Ventura County, California (named after the county seat, the city of Ventura which is named after "Saint Bonaventure" (San Buenaventura in Spanish), a Catholic medieval mystic)
- Victoria County, Texas (Spanish family name, meaning "victory")
- Zapata County, Texas (Spanish family name, "Espadrille")
- Zavala County, Texas

== Populated cities ==
=== Cities ===
==== A ====
- Agua Dulce, California ("sweet water")
- Agua Dulce, El Paso County, Texas ("sweet water")
- Agua Dulce, Nueces County, Texas ("sweet water")
- Ajo, Arizona ("garlic" and city in Cantabria)
- Alamogordo, New Mexico ("fat cottonwood"), seat of Otero County, New Mexico
- Alamosa, Colorado ("of cottonwood")
- Alba, Missouri ("dawn")
- Albuquerque, New Mexico (in honor of Francisco Fernández de la Cueva, 10th Duke of Alburquerque, duke of the town of Alburquerque in Spain)
- Alameda, California ("Poplar Grove")
- Aledo, Illinois (named after Aledo, Murcia, in Spain)
- Alhambra, California (named after Alhambra, in Spain)
- Aliso Viejo, California ("old alder")
- Alta, Iowa, a city in Buena Vista County, Iowa ("tall")
- Altamonte Springs, Florida ("High Mountain" Springs)
- Altavista, Virginia ("tall" view)
- Altura, Minnesota (named after Altura, Castellón, in Spain)
- Alvarado, Texas (named after Alvarado, Veracruz, in Mexico)
- Alvarado, Virginia (named after Alvarado, Veracruz in Mexico)
- Amador City, California (named for José María Amador; amador means "lover" in Spanish)
- Amarillo, Texas ("yellow"), seat of Potter County, Texas
- Andalusia, Alabama (named after the Spanish region of Andalusia)
- Anna Maria, Florida (Juan Ponce de León was said to have named the island for Maria Anna of Neuburg, queen of Carlos II of Spain)
- Arroyo Grande, California ("Large Creek")
- Atascadero, California ("Mudhole")
- Aventura, Florida ("Adventure")

==== B ====
- Bandera, Texas ("Flag")
- Belen, New Mexico (founded as Nuestra Señora de Belén by a group of Spanish colonists led by Diego Torres and Antonio Salazar)
- Benavides, Texas (named after Plácido Benavides, 1837–1919)
- Blanco, Texas (white)
- Boca Del Mar, Florida ("Mouth of the Sea")
- Boca Pointe, Florida ("Mouth [inlet]")
- Boca Raton, Florida ("Thieves Inlet", also "Mouse Mouth". Ratón in Spanish is "mouse", not "rat".)
- Bogata, Texas (from Santa Fe de Bogotá, Nueva Granada)
- Bonanza, Oregon (“prosperity”)
- Bonita Springs, Florida ("beautiful" springs)
- Brazos Bend, Texas ("arms" bend)
- Brea, California ("Tar")
- Buena Park, California ("Good")
- Buena Vista, Virginia ("good view")

==== C ====
- Cadiz, Kentucky (named after the Spanish city Cádiz)
- Calabasas, California (from "calabaza", "Squash")
- Calera, Alabama ("Limestone")
- Camarillo, California ("Way")
- Camargo, Kentucky (named after Camargo (Valle de Camargo) in Cantabria, and Camargo Municipality, Tamaulipas, in Mexico)
- Campo, Colorado ("Countryside")
- Cañon City, Colorado ("Canyon City")
- Cañones, New Mexico ("Canyons")
- Cape Canaveral, Florida (the name Cañaveral in Spanish means canebrake and was given to the area by Spanish explorers for the cane vegetation, or canebrake on the cape. The name translates as "Cape of Canes", or "Cabo Cañaveral")
- Carlos, Minnesota ("Charles")
- Carpinteria, California (called so for the soldiers of the Portola expedition in 1769 because that the Amerindians have many canoes, and at the time were building one) ("Carpentry")
- Carrizo Springs, Texas ("reed")
- Casa Grande, Arizona ("Big House")
- Cerritos, California ("Little Hills")
- Chico, California ("Small", derived from "Rancho del Arroyo Chico", meaning "Small Stream Ranch")
- Chromo, Colorado ("Chrome")
- Chula Vista, California ("Beautiful View")
- Cibolo, Texas ("Cyber")
- Cimarron, Kansas ("maroon")
- Cordova, Alabama (after Córdoba, Veracruz, Mexico, which was named after Córdoba, Spain, from Phoenician-Punic "Qart-Oba", meaning "river city")
- Cordova, Alaska (named after the Spanish admiral Luis de Córdova y Córdova)
- Cordova, Nebraska (after Córdoba, Spain)
- Cortez, Colorado (a Spanish last name)
- Corona, California ("Crown")
- Coronado, California ("Crowned")
- Costa Mesa, California ("Mesa Coast")
- Corunna, Michigan (named after A Coruña, Spain)
- Cruz Bay, a city on the island of St. John in the U.S. Virgin Islands ("cross")
- Cuba, Missouri
- Cuba, New Mexico
- Cuba, New York
- Cuero, Texas (hide)

==== D ====
- DeCordova, Texas (named after Jacob Raphael De Cordova)
- De Leon, Texas (named after the Spanish explorer Ponce de Leon)
- Del Mar, California ("Of the Sea")
- DeSoto, Texas (named for Hernando De Soto)
- De Soto, Iowa (named for Hernando De Soto)
- De Soto, Georgia (named for Hernando De Soto)
- De Soto, Kansas (named for sixteenth-century Spanish explorer, Hernando De Soto)
- De Soto, Missouri (the city, organized in 1857, was named for the explorer Hernando De Soto, who claimed the Louisiana Territory for Spain)
- DeSoto, Texas (named so for Thomas Hernando DeSoto Stewart, a doctor of Spanish partially descent dedicated to the community)
- Diaz, Arkansas (possibly after the Spanish word "dias", which means day, or spanish surname Díaz)
- Delray, Michigan (after Molino del Rey, location of a Mexican–American War battle)
- Delray Beach, Florida (named most immediately from Delray, Michigan)
- Dos Palos, California ("Two Sticks")
- Durango, Colorado (named after Durango, Mexico), seat of La Plata County, Colorado

==== E ====
- El Cajon, California ("The box")
- El Campo, Texas ("The Camp")
- El Cenizo, Texas ("The Ash")
- El Centro, California ("The Center")
- El Cerrito, California ("Little Hill")
- El Dorado, Arkansas ("The Golden One")
- El Dorado, Kansas ("The Golden One")
- Eldorado, Texas ("The Golden One")
- El Monte, California ("The Mountain" or "The Meadow")
- El Nido, California ("The Nest")
- El Paso, Texas ("The Pass"), seat of El Paso County, Texas
- El Paso, Illinois ("The Pass")
- El Reno, Oklahoma ("The Reindeer")
- El Segundo, California ("The Second", second Standard Oil refinery on the West Coast located here)
- Encinitas, California ("Little Oaks")
- Escalante, Utah (in honor of Silvestre Vélez de Escalante, Spanish missionary who explored Utah)
- Escobares, Texas
- Escondido, California ("Hidden")
- Española, New Mexico ("Spanish Woman")
- Espanola, Florida ("Spanish Woman")

==== F ====
- Fernandina, Florida (founded by Florida Spanish governor Enrique White in honor of the Catholic monarch Ferdinand VII of Spain).
- Floresville, Texas – Named after San Antonio's Spanish settler Francisco Flores de Abrego (early settler)
- Fresno, California ("Ash Tree")
- Fresno, Texas ("Ash Tree")
- Frisco, Texas (named in honor of the St. Louis–San Francisco Railway)

==== G ====
- Galveston, Texas (named after governor Bernardo de Gálvez)
- Ganado, Texas ("Livestock")
- Goleta, California ("Schooner")
- Goliad, Texas (believed to be an anagram of Hidalgo (omitting the silent initial "H"), in honor of the patriot priest Miguel Hidalgo, the father of the Mexican War of Independence)
- Gonzales, California (a Spanish last name)
- Gonzales, Louisiana (named so after the mayor of this municipally, Joseph Gonzales)
- Gonzales, Texas (named so after Rafael Gonzales, Governor of Mexican Texas between 1824 and 1826)
- Gordo, Alabama, town in Pickens County, Alabama ("Fat, Big, Huge")
- Granada, Minnesota (after Granada, Spain)
- Guadalupe, California (after "Our Lady of Guadalupe", from Guadalupe, Cáceres, Spain, derived from the Arabic phrase وادي اللب, "Wadee-al-lubb" meaning "hidden river")

==== H ====
- Havana, Arkansas (named after Havana, Cuba, known in Spanish as La Habana)
- Havana, Illinois
- Havana, Kansas
- Havana, North Dakota
- Hermosa Beach, California ("Beautiful Beach")
- Hernando, Mississippi (named so for the Spanish explorer Hernando de Soto, discoverer of the Mississippi River)
- Hidalgo, Texas (after Hidalgo County, which in turn was named after Miguel Hidalgo y Costilla)

==== I ====
- Iberia, Missouri (after Latin name of Iberian Peninsula (Spain & Portugal))
- Indio, California ("Indian")

==== J ====
- Jacinto City, Texas (derived from a Spanish given name)
- Joaquin, Texas (Joachim)

==== K ====
- Key West, Florida (Spanish Cayo Hueso, "Bone Key")

==== L ====
- La Cañada Flintridge, California (La cañada is Spanish for "the canyon, gorge, or ravine"; Flintridge was named after its developer, United States Senator Frank P. Flint.)
- La Grulla, Texas (the crane (bird))
- Laguna Beach, Laguna Hills, Laguna Niguel, and Laguna Woods, all in Orange County, California ("lagoon"; Niguel is a Spanish spelling of a Native American word)
- La Habra, California
- La Joya, Texas ("The Jewel")
- La Junta, Colorado (the junction)
- Lake Buena Vista, Florida
- La Mesa, California ("The Table")
- La Mirada, California ("The Look")
- La Plata, Missouri ("Silver")
- La Plata, Maryland ("The Plate")
- La Puente, California ("The Bridge")
- La Quinta, California ("The Farm")
- La Palma, California (originally called Dairyland because his dairy, when the dairies moved east in 1965, the name of the community was changed to La Palma, after the region's Spanish heritage and its main thoroughfare, La Palma Avenue)
- La Verkin, Utah (Anglicization of "La Virgen", "The Virgin")
- La Villa, Texas ("The Village")
- Laredo, Texas (named after the Spanish city of Laredo)
- La Vista, Nebraska (the view)
- Las Cruces, New Mexico ("The Crosses")
- Las Vegas, Nevada ("The Meadows")
- Las Vegas, New Mexico ("The Meadows")
- Leon, Iowa (after León, Spain)
- Leon, Kansas (it was named after Leon, Iowa)
- Lima, Ohio (named after Lima, Peru)
- Little Havana, Miami, Florida
- Los Alamitos, California ("The Cottonwoods")
- Los Alamos, New Mexico ("the poplars")
- Los Angeles, California ("The Angels", a shortened version of the original name Nuestra Señora Reina de los Ángeles de Porciúncola, "Our Lady Queen of Angels of Porziuncola"), seat of Los Angeles County, California
- Los Banos, California (from Los Baños, "The baths", as in hot springs)
- Los Fresnos, Texas ("the ash trees")
- Los Gatos, California ("The Cats", referring to the cougars that are indigenous to the foothills in which the town is located)
- Los Ybanez, Texas (Spanish surname Ibáñez)

==== M ====
- Madera, California ("Wood")
- Madrid, Iowa (named after the Spanish Capital, Madrid)
- Manteca, California ("Lard")
- Manzanita, Oregon (“Little Apple”)
- Marquez, Texas (named for María de la Márquez)
- Maricopa, Arizona
- Maricopa, California
- Martinez, California (Spanish surname Martínez, Martín's son)
- Merced, California ("Mercy")
- Mercedes, Texas ("Mercies")
- Mesa, Arizona ("Table")
- Mesa, Washington ("Table")
- Mexia, Texas (Named after General José Antonio Mexía, a Mexican hero for the Republic of Texas Army during the Texas Revolution)
- Mexico, Missouri (Named after Mexico)
- Miramar, Florida (named after a town in Granma Province, Cuba, it means "sea view" or "sea-sight". There is a village called Miramar in Valencia, Spain, where could lie the origins of all the cities in America with that name, as there are registries of the town before the year 1527.)
- Modesto, California ("Modest")
- Monterey, California ("King's Mountain", from Spanish Monterrey)
- Montevallo, Alabama ("Surrounding Mountain")
- Montevideo, Minnesota (named after Montevideo, Uruguay)
- Moro, Oregon (Blackberry or Moor man)
- Moreno Valley, California ("dark-colored")
- Morro Bay, California (Morro Rock was named in 1542 by Portuguese navigator Juan Rodríguez Cabrillo, who explored the Pacific Coast for Spain. Cabrillo called the rock "El Moro" because it resembled the head of a Moor, the people from North Africa known for the turbans they wore. However, the dictionary definition for the Spanish word morro ("pebble") is also consistent with the butte-like shape of the rock, and so the term morro is frequently used wherever such a distinctive rock-like mountain is found within the Spanish speaking world.)
- Murrieta, California (derived from a Spanish family name)

==== N ====
- Nevada, Texas ("Snow-covered")
- Nevada City, seat of Nevada County, California
- New Iberia, Louisiana (named after Iberian Peninsula)
- New Madrid, Missouri (named after the Spanish capital, Madrid)
- Nogales, Arizona ("Walnut Trees")

==== O ====
- Ola, Arkansas (Wave)
- Oviedo, Florida (named after the Spanish city of Oviedo)

==== P ====
- Palacios, Texas ("the palace")
- Palo Alto, California ("tall tree" or "tall stick")
- Palo Pinto, Texas (roughly translates to "painted stick")
- Palos Verdes Estates, California ("green stick")
- Panama City, Florida (named after the country Panamá)
- Panama City Beach, Florida (named after the country Panamá)
- Panama, Iowa (named after the country Panamá)
- Panama, Nebraska (named after the country Panamá)
- Pasco, Washington (named after Cerro de Pasco, Perú)
- Paso Robles, California (shortened version of El Paso de Robles, which means "pass of the oaks"; named for the abundance of oak trees in the area)
- Penalosa, Kansas (called so since 1887, in honor of a Spanish explorer, Peñalosa)
- Peñasco, New Mexico ("boulder")
- Peñitas, Texas, a city in Hidalgo County
- Perdido Beach, Alabama, a town located on the northern shore of Perdido Bay ("lost")
- Pico Rivera, California ("Rivera Peak")
- Pinellas Park (derived from Pinellas, meaning "pine forest")
- Plano, Texas ("flat")
- Point Arena, California (formerly, Punta Arenas and Puntas Arenas) ("sand")
- Port Angeles, Washington (from "Puerto de Nuestra Señora de los Ángeles")
- Portola, California (named after Spanish explorer Gaspar de Portolà)
- Potosi, Missouri (named after Potosí, Bolivia)
- Presidio, Texas ("fort", "penitentiary")
- Progreso, Texas ("progress")
- Pueblo, Colorado ("village")
- Punta Gorda, Florida ("fat point" or "fat tip"), seat of Charlotte County, Florida

==== R ====
- Rancho Cucamonga, California (ranch)
- Rancho Mirage, California, resort city ("mirage ranch")
- Rancho Palos Verdes, California (a shortened version of the Mexican land grant Rancho de los Palos Verdes which means "range of green trees")
- Rancho Santa Margarita, California (named for Rancho Santa Margarita y Las Flores)
- Rancho Santa Margarita, California (named for Rancho Santa Margarita y Las Flores)
- Raton, New Mexico (mouse)
- Redondo Beach, California ("Round Beach")
- Refugio, Texas (named for the mission established there, "Our Lady of Refuge,")
- Resaca, Georgia (“dry river bed”)
- Rio Grande City, Texas ("Big River")
- Rio Rancho, New Mexico ("Ranch River")
- Rio Vista, California ("River View")
- Rio Vista, Texas ("River View")

==== S ====
- Sacramento, California ("Sacrament")
- Salamanca, New York (named for the Spanish executive of the railroad that built the place, and Spanish city of Salamanca)
- Salida, Colorado, Statutory City that is the county seat and city of Chaffee County, Colorado ("exit")
- Salina, Utah a city in Sevier County, Utah (Salt Pond)
- Salinas, California a city in Monterey County, California (Salt Ponds)
- San Angelo, Texas
- San Antonio, Florida ("Saint Anthony")
- San Antonio, Texas, seat of Bexar County, Texas
- Saint Augustine, Florida (originally San Agustín: Augustine of Hippo)
- Saint Augustine Beach, Florida
- San Benito, Texas
- San Bernardino, California ("Saint Bernardine"), seat of San Bernardino County, California
- San Bruno, California, a city in San Mateo County, California
- San Buenaventura, California (named after "Saint Bonaventure," a Catholic medieval mystic. The city is commonly known as "Ventura".)
- San Carlos, California, city in San Mateo County
- San Clemente, California ("Saint Clement")
- San Diego, California (named after San Diego de Alcalá, a Spanish Franciscan)
- San Diego, Texas
- San Dimas, California (named in Spanish after Saint Dismas)
- San Elizario, Texas
- San Fernando, California
- San Francisco, California ("Saint Francis")
- San Gabriel, California (named after the Mission San Gabriel Arcángel, founded by Junipero Serra)
- San Jacinto, California ("Saint Hyacinth")
- San Joaquin, California (Saint Joachim)
- San Jose, California ("Saint Joseph")
- San Juan, Texas (for Saint John)
- San Juan Bautista, California ("Saint John the Baptist")
- San Juan Capistrano, California ("Saint John of Capistrano")
- San Leandro, California ("Saint Leonard")
- San Luis, Arizona ("Saint Louis")
- San Luis Obispo, California (Spanish for "Saint Louis of Toulouse" or San Luis Obispo)
- San Marcos, California ("Saint Mark")
- San Marcos, Texas
- San Mateo, California ("Saint Matthew")
- San Pablo, California ("Saint Paul")
- San Perlita, Texas
- San Rafael, California ("Saint Raphael")
- San Ramon, California ("Saint Raymond")
- San Saba, Texas
- Santa Ana, California ("Saint Anne"), seat of Orange County, California
- Santa Barbara, California ("Saint Barbara")
- Santa Clara, California ("Saint Claire")
- Santa Clara, Texas, a city in Guadalupe County, Texas
- Santa Clara, Utah, a city in Washington County, Utah
- Santa Clarita, California ("Saint Claire")
- Santa Cruz, California ("Holy Cross")
- Santa Fe, New Mexico (Holy Faith)
- Santa Fe, Texas ("Holy Faith")
- Santa Fe Springs, California
- San Marcos, Texas
- Santa Anna, Texas (for Saint Anne)
- Santa Maria, California ("Saint Mary")
- Santa Monica, California ("Saint Monica")
- Santaquin, Utah variation of ("Saint Quentin")
- Santa Rita Park, California ("Saint Rita")
- Santa Rosa, California ("Saint Rose")
- Santa Rosa, New Mexico
- Sausalito, California (derived from Spanish word sauzalito, meaning "small willow grove")
- Sebastian, Florida (named St. Sebastian, after Saint Sebastian)
- Seguin, Texas
- Seville, Ohio (named after the Spanish city of Seville)
- Sierra Madre, California (after the mountain range dividing California and Nevada)
- Sierra Vista, Arizona ("Mountain View")
- Socorro, Texas ("Help")
- Solana Beach, California ("warm wind")
- Soledad, California ("Solitude")
- Sonora, California (founded by Mexican miners—reminiscent of the state of Sonora, Mexico—during the California Gold Rush)
- Sonora, Kentucky
- Sonora, Texas
- South El Monte, California (south "the mountain")
- Spanish Fork, Utah (its name derives from a visit to the area by two Franciscan friars from Spain, Silvestre Vélez de Escalante and Francisco Atanasio Domínguez in 1776, who followed the stream down Spanish Fork canyon with the objective of opening a new trail from Santa Fe, New Mexico, to the Spanish missions in California, along a route later followed by fur trappers).

==== T ====
- Todos Santos, California ("All Saints", original name for Concord, California)
- Toledo, Ohio (named after Toledo, Spain)
- Tooele, Utah (originates from "tule", a Spanish word of Aztec origin meaning "bulrush"
- Trinidad, California (the area was named la Santísima Trinidad for Trinity Sunday, 11 June, date in which the Spanish explorers Bruno de Heceta and Juan Francisco de la Bodega y Quadra took possession of place)
- Trinidad, Colorado ("Trinity", named after the Holy Trinity)
- Trinidad, Texas (trinity)
- Tucson, Arizona (derived from the Spanish rendering - Tucsón - of the Native American phrase Cuk Ṣon)

==== U ====
- Uvalde, Texas (called so after Spanish governor Juan de Ugalde)
- Uvalda, Georgia (called also after Juan de Ugalde)

==== V ====
- Vacaville, California ("Cow town", called so after Juan Manuel Cabeza Vaca (1782-1856), who with Juan Felipe Pena received in 1843 the Rancho Los Putos Mexican land grant, which included the peak that now bears Vaca's name)
- Valdez, Alaska (named after the Spanish naval officer Antonio Valdés y Fernández Bazán)
- Vallejo, California (derived from a Spanish family name "Little Valley")
- Val Verda, Utah (derived from "valle verde", meaning "green valley")
- Vega, Texas ("meadow")
- Ventura, California ("Venture", "Luck", "Fortune", or "Happiness". Common name of San Buenaventura, California; Saint Bonaventure)
- Valparaiso, Florida ("Paradise Valley")
- Valparaiso, Indiana
- Victoria, Texas ("Victory", named after the first Mexican President Guadalupe Victoria)
- Villa Rica, Georgia, city in Carroll and Douglas counties in the state of Georgia (Rich Villa)
- Vista, California (view)

==== Y ====
- Yorba Linda, California (hierba linda, "lovely grass")

==== Z ====
- Zapata, Texas (derived from a Spanish family name)
- Zavalla, Texas

=== Native American reservations ===
- Cimarron Lake, a reservoir in Mohave County, Arizona (maroon)
- San Felipe Pueblo, New Mexico
- San Ildefonso Pueblo, New Mexico (partly in Santa Fe County)
- Sandia Pueblo, New Mexico (partly in Bernalillo County)
- Santa Ana Pueblo, New Mexico
- Santa Clara Pueblo, New Mexico (partly in Rio Arriba and Santa Fe Counties)
- Santo Domingo Pueblo (partly in Santa Fe County)
- San Carlos Apache Indian Reservation, Arizona
- Santa Clara Indian Reservation, New Mexico

=== Census-designated places (CDP) and unincorporated communities ===
- Agua Caliente, California, part of Fetters Hot Springs-Agua Caliente, California (a census-designated place) in Sonoma County, California; means "hot water," from the area's natural hot springs
- Agua Dulce, California, a census-designated place in Los Angeles County, California (literally "sweet water"; means "freshwater")
- Agua Linda, Arizona an unincorporated community within Amado, Arizona (a census-designated place) in Santa Cruz County, Arizona
- Agua Nueva, Texas, an unincorporated community in Jim Hogg County, Texas (new water)
- Aguila, Arizona, a census-designated place in Maricopa County, Arizona (eagle)
- Alamo, California, a census-designated place in Contra Costa County, California ("Poplar")
- Alcalde, New Mexico, a census-designated place in Rio Arriba County, New Mexico (mayor)
- Alhambra Valley, California, a census-designated place in Contra Costa County, California (the word alhambra is part of a phase that means to travel in time back to medieval Arab Spain)
- Almeria, Nebraska, an unincorporated community in Loup County, Nebraska (named after a city in Spain which was named an Arabic word meaning "the Watchtower")
- Algodones, New Mexico, a census-designated place in Sandoval County, New Mexico (cottons)
- Alta, California, a census-designated place in Placer County, California (tall [feminine])
- Alta, Fayette County, West Virginia, an unincorporated community in Fayette County, West Virginia
- Alta, Greenbrier County, West Virginia, an unincorporated community in Greenbrier County, West Virginia
- Alta, Wyoming, a census-designated place in Teton County, Wyoming
- Altamont, California, an unincorporated community in Alameda County, California
- Alto, California, a census-designated place adjacent to Mill Valley in Marin County, California (tall [masculine])
- Alto Bonito Heights, a census-designated place in Starr County, Texas (tall beautiful)
- Alto, New Mexico, an unincorporated community in Lincoln County, New Mexico
- Alto Bonito, Texas, a census-designated place in Starr County, Texas
- Amada Acres, Texas, a census-designated place in Starr County, Texas
- Amado, a census-designated place in Santa Cruz County, Arizona
- Amigo, West Virginia, an unincorporated community in Raleigh County, West Virginia (friend)
- Anacua, a census-designated place in Starr County, Texas
- Anza, California, a census-designated place in southern Riverside County, California, in the Anza Valley
- Arboles, Colorado, a census-designated place in Archuleta County, Colorado (trees)
- Arroyo Del Agua, New Mexico, an unincorporated community in Rio Arriba County, New Mexico
- Arroyo Gardens, Texas (creek Gardens), a census-designated place in Cameron County, Texas (stream).
- Asuncion, California, an unincorporated community in San Luis Obispo County, California (assumption)
- Bahia, California, an unincorporated community in Solano County, California ("bay")
- Ballena, California, an unincorporated community in San Diego County, California (whale)
- Barco, North Carolina, an unincorporated community in Currituck County, North Carolina (boat).
- Barrera, a census-designated place in Starr County, Texas (barrier or gate)
- Bayo Vista, California, an unincorporated community in Contra Costa County, California (bay view)
- Benjamin Perez, a census-designated place in Starr County, Texas
- Boca Del Mar, Florida, a census-designated place in Palm Beach County, Florida (mouth of sea)
- Boca Pointe, Florida, a census-designated place in Palm Beach County, Florida (mouth)
- Boca Raton, Florida, a census-designated place near Boca Raton in Palm Beach County (from Boca Ratón: derives from the Spanish word boca [mouth], which was often used to describe an inlet/mouth of a river, while ratón (literally mouse) was used by Spanish sailors to describe rocks that gnawed at a ship's cable, or mouse was a term for a cowardly thief)
- Bonanza, Utah, a census-designated place in Uintah County, Utah
- Bonita, California, a census-designated place in southern San Diego County, California (beautiful or pretty [feminine])
- Bonita, Madera County, California, an unincorporated community in Madera County, California
- Bonita, Kansas, an unincorporated community in Johnson County, Kansas
- Bonita, Wisconsin, an unincorporated community in the town of Mountain, Wisconsin, Oconto County, Wisconsin
- Brazos, New Mexico, a census-designated place in Rio Arriba County, New Mexico
- Brazos, Texas, an unincorporated community in Palo Pinto County, Texas
- Brito, California, an unincorporated community in Merced County, California
- Buena Vista, California, the name (and former name) of a census-designated place and multiple unincorporated communities in California ("Good view")
- Buena Vista, Michigan - an unincorporated community within Buena Vista Charter Township, Saginaw County in Michigan (named for the place where Zachary Taylor had recently won a victory in the Mexican–American War).
- Buena Vista, New Mexico - an unincorporated community located in Mora County, New Mexico
- Buena Vista, Oregon, unincorporated community in Polk County (after the Battle of Buena Vista in the Mexican–American War)
- Buena Vista, a census-designated place in Starr County, Texas
- Caballo, New Mexico, a census-designated place in Sierra County, New Mexico ("Horse")
- Cadiz, California, an unincorporated community in the Mojave Desert in San Bernardino County, California
- Cadiz, Illinois, an unincorporated community in Hardin County, Illinois
- Caliente, California, an unincorporated community in Kern County, California ("hot")
- Callao, Utah, small farming community in northern Snake Valley, Utah (named after Callao, Peru)
- Camino, California, a census-designated place in El Dorado County, California (road, path, or way)
- Camino Tassajara, California, a census-designated place in Contra Costa County, California
- Campo, California, a census-designated place in the Mountain Empire area of southeastern San Diego County, California (camp or field)
- Campo Verde, a census-designated place in Starr County, Texas (freen field)
- Canjilon, New Mexico, a census-designated place in Rio Arriba County, New Mexico
- Cañoncito, New Mexico, the name of six different unincorporated communities in six counties of New Mexico
- Canova, New Mexico, a census-designated place in Rio Arribea County, New Mexico (sluice)
- Canyon, California, an unincorporated community near the border of Contra Costa and Alameda counties, in California (taken from cañón)
- Capitan, Louisiana, an unincorporated community in Lafayette Parish, Louisiana (captain)
- Carlos, Maryland, a census-designated place in Allegany County, Maryland (Charles)
- Carmen, Arizona, an unincorporated community in Santa Cruz County, Arizona
- Carthagena, Ohio, an unincorporated community in Mercer County, Ohio (named after Cartagena, Spain)
- Casa Blanca, Starr County, Texas, a census-designated place located in Starr County, Texas (white house)
- Casa Piedra, Arizona, a populated place situated in Santa Cruz County, Arizona (rock house)
- Casas, Texas, a census-designated place in Starr County, Texas (houses)
- Casas Adobes, Arizona, a census-designated place in the northern metropolitan area of Tucson, Arizona (adobe houses)
- Castro Valley, California, a census-designated place in Alameda County ("Valley of Castles". Named after soldier and rancher Guillermo Castro)
- Cazadero, California, a census-designated place in western Sonoma County, California ("hunting ground")
- Cebolla, New Mexico, an unincorporated community in Rio Arriba County, New Mexico (onion)
- Cedro, New Mexico, a census-designated place in Bernalillo County, New Mexico (cedar)
- Cesar Chavez, Texas, a census-designated place in Hidalgo County, Texas
- Chalco, Nebraska, a census-designated place in northern Sarpy County, Nebraska (named after Chalco de Díaz Covarrubias, state of Mexico)
- Chamita, New Mexico, a census-designated place in Rio Arriba County, New Mexico
- Chaparrito, Texas, a census-designated place in Starr County, Texas
- Chimayo, New Mexico, a census-designated place in Rio Arriba and Taos Counties, New Mexico
- Cimarron, Colorado, an unincorporated community and U.S. Post Office in Montrose County, Colorado
- Cimarron Hills, Colorado, a census-designated place in El Paso County, Colorado
- Cimarron, Texas, an unincorporated community in Harris County, Texas
- Colonia, New Jersey, a census-designated place within Woodbridge Township, in Middlesex County, New Jersey (colony)
- Colyell, Louisiana, an unincorporated community in Livingston Parish, Louisiana (received its name after Francisco Collell, Spanish sub-lieutenant and Commandant of Galvez, Louisiana (in 1779). Probably was the mispronunciation of name which changed the spelling from "Collell" to "Colyell")
- Concepcion, Texas, a census-designated place in Duval County, Texas
- Conejo, California, an unincorporated community in Fresno County, California (rabbit)
- Conejos, Colorado, a census-designated place, a U.S. Post Office, and the county seat of Conejos County, Colorado ("Rabbits")
- Contra Costa Centre, California, a census-designated place in Contra Costa County, California (Opposite Coast)
- Cordova, New Mexico, a census-designated place in Rio Arriba County, New Mexico
- Corona, Tennessee, an unincorporated community in Tipton County, Tennessee (crown)
- Coronado, Kansas, an unincorporated community in Wichita County, Kansas (crowned)
- Corte Madera, California, an incorporated community in Marin County, California ("Cut Wood")
- Cortez, California, an unincorporated community in Merced County, California
- Coto de Caza, California, a census-designated place and guard-gated private community in Orange County, California ("Wildlife preserve")
- Coyote, New Mexico, a census-designated place and an unincorporated community in New Mexico
- Cuba, Indiana, an unincorporated community in Allen County, Indiana
- Cuchara, Colorado, an unincorporated community in Huerfano County, Colorado (spoon)
- Cuzco, Indiana, an unincorporated community in Columbia Township, Dubois County, Indiana. Named after Cusco, Peru
- Del Rey, California, a census-designated place in Fresno County, California (Of the king)
- De Soto, Nebraska, an unincorporated community in Washington County, Nebraska (it was named in honor of the sixteenth-century Spanish explorer, Hernando De Soto)
- Descanso, California, a census-designated place in the Cuyamaca Mountains, within the Mountain Empire area of southeastern San Diego County, California (rest)
- Dulzura, California, an unincorporated community in San Diego County, California (gentleness)
- Dinero, Texas, an unincorporated community in eastern Live Oak County, Texas (money)
- Dos Cabezas, Arizona, an unincorporated community in Cochise County, Arizona (two heads)
- Dos Palos Y, California, a census-designated place in Merced County, California
- Dulce, New Mexico, a census-designated place in Rio Arriba County, New Mexico
- East Alto Bonito, Texas, a census-designated place in Starr County, Texas
- East Lopez, Texas, a census-designated place in Starr County, Texas
- East Verde Estates, Arizona, a census-designated place in Gila County, Arizona (East Green Estates).
- El Capitán, a census-designated place in Gila County, Arizona (The Captain)
- El Castillo, Texas, a census-designated place in Starr County, Texas (Castle)
- El Chaparral, Texas, a census-designated place in Starr County, Texas
- El Dorado, California, an unincorporated community in El Dorado County, California (the golden one)
- El Duende, New Mexico, a census-designated place in Rio Arriba County, New Mexico
- El Nido, Merced County, California, a census-designated place in Merced County, California (the nest)
- El Rancho, New Mexico, a census-designated place in Santa Fe County, New Mexico (of Spanish The Ranch)
- El Rancho Vela, Texas, a census-designated place in Starr County, Texas
- El Refugio, Texas, a census-designated place in Starr County, Texas (the refuge)
- El Rito, New Mexico, an unincorporated community in Rio Arriba County, New Mexico
- El Sobrante, California, a census-designated place in Contra Costa County, California ("the surplus")
- El Socio, Texas, a census-designated place located in Starr County, Texas (the Partner)
- Elias-Fela Solis, Texas, a census-designated place located in Starr County, Texas
- Embudo, New Mexico, an unincorporated community in Rio Arriba County, New Mexico (funnel)
- Ensenada, New Mexico, a census-designated place in Rio Arriba County, New Mexico
- Escobar I, Texas, a census-designated place located in Starr County, Texas
- Espanola, Florida, an unincorporated community in Flagler County, Florida (Spanish Woman)
- Espanola, Washington, an unincorporated community, in Spokane County in the state of Washington.
- Eugenio Saenz, Texas, a census-designated place located in Starr County, Texas
- Falcon Heights, Texas, a Census-designated place located in Starr County, Texas
- Falcon Village, Texas, a Census-designated place located in Starr County, Texas
- Falconaire, Texas, a census-designated place in Starr County, Texas
- Fernando Salinas, Texas, a census-designated place in Starr County, Texas
- Fetters Hot Springs-Agua Caliente, a census-designated place in Sonoma Valley, Sonoma County, California
- Flor del Rio, Texas, a census-designated place in Starr County, Texas (Flower of River)
- Fronton, Texas, a census-designated place (CDP) in Starr County, Texas (pediment)
- Galisteo, New Mexico, a census-designated place in Santa Fe County, New Mexico
- Gallina, New Mexico, a census-designated place in Rio Arriba County, New Mexico (hen)
- Galvez, Louisiana, an unincorporated community in Ascension Parish, Louisiana (named after governor Bernardo de Gálvez)
- Ganado, Arizona, a chapter (municipality) of the Navajo Nation and census-designated place in Apache County, Arizona (livestock)
- Garcia, Colorado, an unincorporated community and a U.S. Post Office located in Costilla County, Colorado
- Garciasville, Texas, a census-designated place located in Starr County, Texas
- Gardnerville Ranchos, Nevada, a census-designated place in Douglas County, Nevada
- Garza-Salinas II, Texas, a census-designated place in Starr County, Texas
- Gaviota, California, an unincorporated community in Santa Barbara County, California ("seagull")
- Golondrinas, New Mexico, an unincorporated community in Mora County, New Mexico (the Swallows)
- Gomez, Kentucky, an unincorporated community in Elliott County, Kentucky
- Gonzalez, Florida, a census-designated place in Escambia County, Florida
- Guadalupe-Guerra, Texas, a census-designated place in Starr County, Texas
- Guerra, Texas, a census-designated place in Jim Hogg County, Texas (literally "war")
- Campo Verde, a census-designated place in Starr County, Texas
- Halchita, Utah, a census-designated place in San Juan County, Utah
- Havana, Alabama, an unincorporated community in Hale County, Alabama
- Havana, Ohio, an unincorporated community in Huron County, Ohio
- Havana, Texas, a census-designated place in Hidalgo County, Texas
- Havana, West Virginia, an unincorporated community in Boone County, West Virginia
- Hernando, Florida, a census-designated place in Citrus County, Florida
- Hernandez, New Mexico, a census-designated place in Rio Arriba County, New Mexico
- Huerfano, New Mexico, a census-designated place in San Juan County, New Mexico (Orphan)
- Indio, Texas, a census-designated place located in Starr County, Texas (Indian)
- Isla Vista, California, a census-designated place in Santa Barbara County, California (island view)
- Isleta Village Proper, New Mexico, a census-designated place in Bernalillo County, New Mexico ("Little Island")
- Jacinto, Nebraska, an unincorporated community in Kimball County, Nebraska
- Jardin de San Julian, Texas, a census-designated place in Starr County, Texas (Garden of Saint Julian)
- JF Villarreal, Texas, a census-designated place in Starr County, Texas
- Juntura, Oregon, an unincorporated community in Malheur County, Oregon (Juncture)
- La Blanca, Texas, a census-designated place in Hidalgo County, Texas ("The White One")
- La Carla, Texas, a census-designated place in Starr County, Texas
- La Casita-Garciasville, Texas, a census-designated place in Starr County, Texas (the little house)
- La Cienega, Arizona, an unincorporated community in Gila County, Arizona
- La Chuparosa, Texas, a census-designated place in Starr County, Texas
- La Escondida, Texas, a census-designated place in Starr County, Texas
- La Esperanza, Texas, a census-designated place in Starr County, Texas (The Hope)
- Las Flores, California, a census-designated place in Orange County, California ("The Flowers")
- La Gloria, Starr County, Texas, an unincorporated community in Starr County, Texas (the glory)
- La Homa, Texas, a census-designated place in Hidalgo County, Texas
- La Madera, New Mexico, a census-designated place in Rio Arriba County, New Mexico
- La Mesilla, New Mexico, a census-designated place in Rio Arriba County, New Mexico
- La Puerta, Texas, a census-designated place in Starr County, Texas (the door)
- La Reforma, Texas, an unincorporated community in Starr County, Texas (the reforms)
- La Rosita, Texas, a census-designated place in Starr County, Texas (the little rose)
- La Victoria, Texas, a census-designated place in Starr County, Texas (the victory)
- La Loma de Falcon, Texas, a census-designated place in Starr County, Texas
- La Sal, Utah, a census-designated place in San Juan County, Utah, meaning The Salt
- La Villita, New Mexico, a census-designated place in Rio Arriba County, New Mexico
- Las Lomas, Texas, a census-designated place in Starr County, Texas
- Las Lomitas, Texas, a census-designated place in Jim Hogg County, Texas
- Las Palmas-Juarez, Texas, a census-designated place in Cameron County, Texas
- Las Tablas, New Mexico, an unincorporated community in Rio Arriba County, New Mexico
- Las Trampas, New Mexico, or Trampas, is a small unincorporated community in Taos County, New Mexico (the traps)
- Laguna, New Mexico, a census-designated place in Cibola County, New Mexico (Small lake)
- Laguna Beach, Florida, a Census-designated place in Bay County, Florida
- Lagunitas, California, an unincorporated community in Marin County, California
- Lagunitas-Forest Knolls, California, a census-designated place in the western half of the San Geronimo Valley in Marin County, California
- Laguna Seca, Texas, a census-designated place in Hidalgo County, Texas ("Dry Lake")
- Lajitas, Texas, an unincorporated community in Brewster County, Texas ("Little Flat Rocks")
- La Minita, a census-designated place in Starr County, Texas (The little mine)
- La Paloma Ranchettes, a census-designated place in Starr County, Texas
- Lago Vista, a census-designated place in Starr County, Texas (Seen Lake)
- La Minita, a census-designated place in Starr County, Texas (The little mine)
- Lima, Pennsylvania, a census-designated place in Delaware County, Pennsylvania
- Lima (community), Wisconsin, an unincorporated community in Lima, Pepin County, Wisconsin
- Lima Center, Wisconsin, an unincorporated community in Lima, Rock County, Wisconsin
- Linda, California, a census-designated place in Yuba County, California (cute)
- Llano Grande, Texas, a census-designated place in Hidalgo County, Texas ("Great Plain")
- Loma Linda East, a census-designated place in Starr County, Texas
- Loma Vista, a census-designated place in Starr County, Texas
- Longoria, a census-designated place in Starr County, Texas
- Los Alvarez, Texas, a census-designated place in Starr County, Texas
- Los Arrieros, Texas, a census-designated place in Starr County, Texas
- Los Barreras, Texas, a census-designated place in Starr County, Texas
- Los Berros, California, a census-designated place in San Luis Obispo County, California (the Watercress in plural)
- Los Ebanos, Starr County, Texas, a census-designated place in Starr County, Texas
- Los Luceros, New Mexico, a census-designated place in Rio Arriba County, New Mexico
- Los Ojos, New Mexico, a census-designated place in Rio Arriba County, New Mexico
- Los Osos, California, a census-designated place along the Pacific Coast of San Luis Obispo County, California ("The Bears")
- Los Ranchos, California, a census-designated place in San Luis Obispo County, California (The Ranches)
- Los Villareales, Texas, a census-designated place in Starr County, Texas
- Lopezville, Texas, a census-designated place in Hidalgo County, Texas
- Los Ebanos, Hidalgo County, Texas, a census-designated place in Hidalgo County, Texas ("The Ebony trees")
- Loxa, Illinois, an unincorporated community in Coles County, Illinois (called after Loja, Granada, in Spain
- Madera Canyon, Arizona an unincorporated community situated in Santa Cruz County, Arizona
- Madrid, Maine, unincorporated community in East Central Franklin, in Franklin County, Maine
- Madrid, New Mexico, a census-designated place in Santa Fe County, New Mexico
- Madrid, New York, a census-designated place in St. Lawrence County, New York
- Malaga, New Jersey, an unincorporated community in Franklin Township, in Gloucester County, New Jersey (called after Málaga, Spain).
- Manuel Garcia, Texas, a census-designated place in Starr County, Texas
- Manuel Garcia II, Texas, a census-designated place in Starr County, Texas
- Manzano, New Mexico, a census-designated place in Torrance County, New Mexico (of Spanish Appletree Spring)
- Manzano Springs, New Mexico, a census-designated place in Torrance and Bernalillo counties, New Mexico
- Marina del Rey, California, an affluent census-designated place in Los Angeles County, California ("King's Navy")
- Mariposa, California, a census-designated place in and the county seat of Mariposa County, California (butterfly)
- Marrero, Louisiana, a census-designated place in Jefferson Parish, Louisiana (named after the Spanish American politician Louis H. Marrero)
- Martinez, Georgia, a census-designated place in Columbia County, Georgia
- Martinez, Texas, an unincorporated community in eastern Bexar County, Texas
- Martinez, Starr County, Texas, a census-designated place in Starr County, Texas
- Matagorda, Texas, an unincorporated community in Matagorda County, Texas
- Matamoras, Indiana, an unincorporated community in the northeast portion of Harrison Township, Blackford County, Indiana (named after the Mexican town of Matamoros ("kill the Moors"), which was the first to be occupied by U.S. troops during the Mexican–American War)
- Medanales, New Mexico, an unincorporated community in Rio Arriba County, New Mexico
- Mendocino, California, an unincorporated community in Mendocino County, California (adjectival form of the family name of Mendoza)
- Mesa, California, a census-designated place in Inyo County, California (table)
- Mesa, Colorado, an unincorporated community and a U.S. Post Office in Mesa County, Colorado
- Mesa del Caballo, a census-designated place in Gila County, Arizona (Table of horse)
- Mesa Vista, California, a census-designated place in Alpine County, California ("Table view")
- Mexican Hat, Utah a census-designated place along the San Juan River in San Juan County, Utah
- Mexico, Indiana, a census-designated place in Miami County, Indiana
- Mexico, Kentucky, an unincorporated community, in Crittenden County, Kentucky
- Mexico, Allegany County, Maryland, an unincorporated community, in Allegany County, Maryland
- Mexico, Carroll County, Maryland, an unincorporated community in Carroll County, Maryland
- Mexico, Ohio, an unincorporated community in northeastern Tymochtee Township, Wyandot County, Ohio
- Mexico, Juniata County, Pennsylvania, a census-designated place within Walker Township in Juniata County, Pennsylvania
- Mexico, Montour County, Pennsylvania, an unincorporated community in Montour County, Pennsylvania
- Mexico, Texas, a historical unincorporated community in Hunt County, Texas
- Mi Ranchito Estate, Texas, a census-designated place in Starr County, Texas (My Little Ranch Estate)
- Mier, Indiana, a census-designated place in Richland Township, Grant County, Indiana (named after Ciudad Mier, Tamaulipoas, Mexico)
- Miranda, California, an unincorporated community in Humboldt County, California
- Miranda, South Dakota, an unincorporated community in Faulk County
- Modena, Utah, an unincorporated community in Iron County, Utah, near the Nevada border
- Montana, Kansas, an unincorporated community in Labette County, Kansas
- Montana City, Montana, a census-designated place in Jefferson County, Montana
- Montana (community), Wisconsin, an unincorporated community within Montana in Buffalo County, Wisconsin
- Monte Alto, Texas, a census-designated place in Hidalgo County, Texas ("High Mountain")
- Montecito, California, a census-designated place in Santa Barbara County, California ("Little Mountain")
- Montezuma Creek, a census-designated place in San Juan County, Utah
- Mora, Louisiana, an unincorporated community in Natchitoches Parish, Louisiana (Blackberry or Moor woman)
- Mora, New Mexico (also called Santa Gertrudis de lo de Mora), a census-designated place in and the county seat of Mora County, New Mexico
- Mosca, Colorado, an unincorporated community in Alamosa County, Colorado (named for the nearby Mosca Pass, which was named for the Spanish explorer, Luis de Moscoso Alvarado. It also means fly).
- Mount Vista, Washington, a census-designated place in Clark County, Washington (view)
- Naranja, Florida, census-designated place in Miami-Dade County, Florida (orange)
- Narciso Pena, a census-designated place in Starr County, Texas
- New Almaden, California, an unincorporated community in Santa Clara County, California (named after Almadén, in Spain
- New Santa Fe, Indiana, an unincorporated community within Butler Township, Miami County, Indiana
- North Escobares, Texas, a census-designated place in Starr County, Texas
- North Lima, Ohio, an unincorporated community in central Mahoning County, Ohio
- North San Juan, California, a census-designated place in Nevada County, California
- Nunez, Louisiana, an unincorporated community in Vermilion Parish, Louisiana
- Oceano, California, a census-designated place in San Luis Obispo County, California (ocean)
- Ojo Caliente, New Mexico, an unincorporated community in Rio Arriba and Taos Counties, New Mexico
- Ojo Sarco, New Mexico, an unincorporated community in Rio Arriba County, New Mexico
- Ola, Georgia, an unincorporated community in Henry County, Georgia (Wave)
- Ola, Idaho, an unincorporated community in Gem County, Idaho
- Ola, South Dakota, a census-designated place in Brule County, South Dakota
- Old Escobares, a census-designated place in Starr County, Texas
- Olivia Lopez de Gutierrez, Texas, a census-designated place in Starr County, Texas
- Oljato, Utah, a census-designated place in San Juan County, Utah
- Oro Blanco, an unincorporated community in Santa Cruz County, Arizona
- Oso, Washington, a census-designated place in Snohomish County, Washington (bear)
- Pablo Pena, a census-designated place in Starr County, Texas (Pablo Pain)
- Pacheco, California, a census-designated place in Contra Costa County, California
- Pajaro, California, a census-designated place in Monterey County, California (bird)
- Pajaro Dunes, California, a census-designated place in Santa Cruz County, California
- Pajarito Mesa, New Mexico, a census-designated place in Bernalillo County, New Mexico (Little bird Mesa)
- Palo Blanco, a census-designated place in Starr County, Texas (White stick)
- Palo Pinto, Texas, an unincorporated community in Palo Pinto County, Texas
- Palomar Mountain, California, an unincorporated community in San Diego County, California (pigeon roost)
- Palominas, Arizona, a census-designated place in Cochise County, Arizona
- Panama, California (formerly named Rio Bravo after the Spanish name for the Kern River, Rio Bravo de San Felipe), an unincorporated community in Kern County, California
- Pedro, Ohio, an unincorporated community in central Elizabeth Township, Lawrence County, Ohio
- Pena, Texas, a census-designated place in Starr County, Texas (pain)
- Peña Blanca, New Mexico, a census-designated place in Sandoval County, New Mexico (white peña)
- Peñasco, New Mexico, a census-designated place in Taos County, New Mexico
- Perote, Alabama, an unincorporated community in Bullock County, Alabama (named after Perote, Veracruz)
- Petaca, New Mexico, an unincorporated community in Rio Arriba County, New Mexico
- Pie, West Virginia, an unincorporated community in Mingo County, West Virginia (foot)
- Piedra, California, an unincorporated community in Fresno County, California (stone)
- Pilar, New Mexico, a small unincorporated community in Taos County, New Mexico
- Pinto, Utah, an early unincorporated community, settled along the Los Angeles & Salt Lake Railroad, in Washington County, Utah (brown). The site was also a natural stopping place along the Old Spanish Trail.
- Pintura, Utah, an unincorporated community in Washington County, Utah (painting)
- Plumas Eureka, census-designated place in Plumas County, California (feathers)
- Plumas Lake, California, master-planned exurb and census-designated place in Yuba County, California
- Ponderosa, California, a census-designated place in Tulare County, California.
- Ponderosa Pine, New Mexico, a census-designated place in Bernalillo County, New Mexico
- Ponte Vedra Beach, Florida, a wealthy unincorporated community and suburb of Jacksonville, Florida (named after Pontevedra, Galicia, in Spain)
- Port Mahon, Delaware, an unincorporated community in Kent County, Delaware (named after Mahon, in Menorca, Spain)
- Pozo, California, an unincorporated community in San Luis Obispo County, California (Water well)
- Pueblito, New Mexico, a census-designated place in Rio Arriba County, New Mexico
- Pueblo of Sandia Village, New Mexico, a census-designated place in Sandoval County, New Mexico
- Quesada, a census-designated place in Starr County, Texas
- Quito, Mississippi, an unincorporated community located in Leflore County, Mississippi
- Ramirez, Texas, an unincorporated community in southern Duval County, Texas
- Ramirez-Perez, Texas, a census-designated place in Starr County, Texas
- Ramos, Texas, a census-designated place in Starr County, Texas
- Rancho Alegre, Texas, a Census-designated place in Jim Wells County, Texas (cheerful ranch)
- Rancho Banquete, Texas, a census-designated place in Nueces County, Texas (Banquet ranch)
- Rancho Chico, Texas, a census-designated place in San Patricio County, Texas (Little ranch)
- Rancho de la Parita, Texas, a small unincorporated community in northwestern Jim Wells County, Texas
- Ranchos Penitas West, Texas, a census-designated place in Webb County, Texas
- Rancho San Diego, California, a census-designated place in San Diego County, California (named after San Diego de Alcalá, a Spanish Franciscan)
- Rancho Santa Fe, California, a census-designated place in San Diego County, California
- Ranchos de Taos, New Mexico, a census-designated place in Taos County, New Mexico
- Ranchitos del Norte, Texas, a census-designated place in Starr County, Texas (Little Ranches of the North)
- Rancho Viejo, a census-designated place in Starr County, Texas (Old Ranch)
- Raso, Arizona, an unincorporated community in Cochise County, Arizona (flat plain)
- Regino Ramirez, Texas, a census-designated place in Starr County, Texas
- Relampago, Texas, a census-designated place in Hidalgo County, Texas ("Lightning flash")
- Rio Chiquito, New Mexico, a census-designated place in Rio Arriba County, New Mexico
- Rio Creek, Wisconsin, an unincorporated community in Kewaunee County, Wisconsin
- Rio Grande, New Jersey, a census-designated place within Middle Township in Cape May County, New Jersey
- Rio Rico, Arizona, a census-designated place in Santa Cruz County, Arizona ("rich river")
- Rio Verde, Arizona, a census-designated place in Maricopa County, Arizona (green river)
- Rios, Texas, an unincorporated community in Duval County, Texas (rivers)
- Rivera, Texas, a census-designated place in Starr County, Texas
- Rodeo, California, a census-designated place in Contra Costa County, California (round up)
- Rodeo, New Mexico, an unincorporated community in Hidalgo County, New Mexico
- Salida, California, a census-designated place in Stanislaus County, California
- Salineño, Texas, a census-designated place in Starr County, Texas
- Salineño North, Texas, a census-designated place in Starr County, Texas
- Saltillo, Nebraska, an unincorporated community in Lancaster County, Nebraska (likely named so after the city of Saltillo, Mexico)
- Saltillo, Ohio, an unincorporated community in Perry County, Ohio
- Saltillo, Texas, an unincorporated community in Hopkins County, Texas
- Sammy Martinez, Texas, a census-designated place in Starr County, Texas
- San Antonito, Bernalillo County, New Mexico, a census-designated place in Bernalillo County, New Mexico
- San Carlos, Arizona, a census-designated place in Gila County, Arizona ("Saint Charles")
- San Carlos, Texas, a census-designated place in Hidalgo County, Texas
- San Carlos Park, Florida, a census-designated place in Lee County, Florida
- San Cristobal, New Mexico, a census-designated place in Taos County, New Mexico
- San Fernando, Texas, a census-designated place in Starr County, Texas
- San Gregorio, California, an unincorporated community in San Mateo County, California ("Saint Gregory")
- San Isidro, Texas, a census-designated place (CDP) in Starr County, Texas
- San Jose, New Mexico, a census-designated place in Rio Arriba County, New Mexico
- San Jose, New Mexico, a census-designated place in San Miguel County, New Mexico
- San Juan, New Mexico, a census-designated place in Rio Arriba County, New Mexico
- San Juan, Texas, a census-designated place in Starr County, Texas
- San Lorenzo, California, a census-designated place in the San Francisco Bay Area in Alameda County, California ("Saint Lawrence")
- San Lorenzo, New Mexico, the name of three unincorporated communities in Grant, Rio Arriba, and Sandoval Counties, New Mexico
- San Lucas, California, a census-designated place in Monterey County, California (named so for the Rancho San Lucas Mexican land grant)
- San Martin, California, a census-designated place in Santa Clara County, California
- San Miguel, Contra Costa County, California, a census designated place in Contra Costa, California
- San Miguel, San Luis Obispo County, California, a census designated place in San Luis Obispo County, California
- San Pablo, Colorado, an unincorporated community in Costilla County, Colorado
- San Pedro, New Mexico, a census-designated place in Santa Fe County, New Mexico
- San Ramon Village, California, an unincorporated community in Alameda County, California
- San Simeon, California, a census designated place in San Luis Obispo County, California
- San Simon, Arizona, a census-designated place in Cochise County, Arizona
- Sandia, California, a census-designated place in Imperial County, California (watermelon)
- Sandia Park, New Mexico, a census-designated place in Bernalillo County, New Mexico
- Sandia, Texas, a census-designated place in Jim Wells County, Texas
- Sandoval, Texas, a census-designated place in Starr County, Texas
- Sangre de Cristo Ranches, Colorado, an unincorporated community located near Fort Garland in Costilla County, Colorado
- Santa Ana Pueblo, New Mexico, a census-designated place in Sandoval County, New Mexico
- Santa Anna, Texas, a census-designated place in Starr County, Texas
- Santa Catarina, Texas, an unincorporated community in Starr County, Texas
- Santa Cruz, New Mexico, a census-designated place in Santa Fe County, New Mexico
- Santa Cruz, Texas, a census-designated place in Starr County, Texas
- Santa Cruz, Texas, a census-designated place in Starr County, Texas
- Santa Elena, Texas, an unincorporated community in Starr County, Texas
- Santa Rita Park, an unincorporated community in Merced County, California
- Santa Rosa, a census-designated place in Starr County, Texas
- Santa Fe, Missouri, an unincorporated community in southeastern Monroe County, Missouri
- Santa Fe, Ohio, an unincorporated community on the border of Clay Township in Auglaize County and Stokes Township in Logan County, Ohio
- Santa Fe, Miami County, Indiana, an unincorporated community in Butler Township, Miami County, Indiana
- Santa Fe, Spencer County, Indiana, an unincorporated community in Spencer County, Indiana
- Santa Fe, Tennessee, an unincorporated community in Maury County, Tennessee
- Santa Maria, Texas, a census-designated place, in Cameron County, Texas
- Santa Margarita, California, a census-designated place in San Luis Obispo County, California ("Saint Margaret")
- Santa Monica, Florida, an unincorporated community in Bay County, Florida
- Santa Nella, California, a census-designated place in Merced County, California
- Santa Susana, California, a census-designated place in Ventura County, California
- Santa Rosa, Arizona, a census-designated place in Pima County, Arizona
- Santa Ysabel, California, an unincorporated community in the Santa Ysabel Valley of eastern San Diego County, California (Saint Elizabeth)
- Santo, Texas, an unincorporated community in Palo Pinto County, Texas
- Saragossa, Alabama, an unincorporated community in Walker County, Alabama (named after Zaragoza, Spain)
- Sarita, Texas, a census-designated place in and the county seat of Kenedy County, Texas
- Sebastian, Ohio (also St. Sebastian), an unincorporated community in northern Marion Township, Mercer County, Ohio
- Sebastian, Texas, a census-designated place in Willacy County, Texas
- Seville, Florida, an unincorporated community in Volusia County, Florida
- Sierra Blanca, Texas, a census-designated place in and the county seat of Hudspeth County, Texas
- San Simeon, California, a census-designated place on the Pacific Coast of San Luis Obispo County, California
- Seboyeta, a census-designated place in Cibola County, New Mexico (spring onion)
- Sobrante, California, an unincorporated community in Contra Costa County, California, ("wealthy")
- Spanish Valley, Utah a census-designated place in San Juan County, Utah
- Sunol, California, a census-designated place in Alameda County, California (derived from a Spanish surname, Suñol)
- Tassajara, California, an unincorporated community in Contra Costa County, California (probably from tasajera or tasajara a kind of "slaughterhouse")
- Terlingua, Texas, a mining district and census-designated place in southwestern Brewster County, Texas ("Three Tongues")
- Tierra Amarilla, New Mexico, a small unincorporated community and county seat (near the Carson National Forest) in the Rio Arriba County, New Mexico (yellow earth)
- Tierra Del Mar, Oregon, an unincorporated community in Tillamook County, Oregon
- Tierra Dorada, Texas, a census-designated place in Starr County, Texas (Golden Land)
- Tome-Adelino, New Mexico, a former census-designated place in Valencia County, New Mexico. It was called after the governor of New Mexico between 1664 and 1664 Tomé Domínguez de Mendoza.
- Toro Canyon, California, a census-designated place in Santa Barbara County, California ("Bull")
- Trinidad, Washington, an unincorporated community and ghost town in Grant County, Washington (trinity).
- Truchas, New Mexico, an unincorporated community in Rio Arriba County, New Mexico
- Uva, California, an unincorporated community in Fresno County, California (grape)
- Uvalde Estates, Texas, a census-designated place in Uvalde County, Texas
- Valdez, Florida, an unincorporated community in southwest Volusia County, Florida
- Valencia West, Arizona, a census-designated place in Pima County, Arizona
- Valencia, New Mexico, census-designated places in Santa Fe County and Valencia County, New Mexico
- Valle Hermoso, Texas, a census-designated place in Starr County, Texas (Beautiful valley)
- Valle Vista, California, a census-designated place in Riverside County, California (Valley view)
- Valle Vista, Texas, a census-designated place in Starr County, Texas
- Vallecitos, New Mexico, an unincorporated community in Rio Arriba County, New Mexico
- Val Verde, California, a census-designated place in Los Angeles County, California
- Val Verde Park, Texas, census-designated place in Val Verde County, Texas
- Velarde, New Mexico, a census-designated place in Rio Arriba County, New Mexico
- Vera Cruz, Missouri, an unincorporated community in central Douglas County, Missouri (called so after Veracruz, Mexico)
- Veyo, Utah a census-designated place in Washington County, Utah
- Victor, California, a census-designated place in San Joaquin County, California
- Victoria Vera, Texas, a census-designated place in Starr County, Texas
- Vida, Montana, an unincorporated village in northern McCone County, Montana (life)
- Vida, Oregon, an unincorporated community in Lane County, Oregon
- Vida, Missouri, an unincorporated community in Phelps County, Missouri
- Villarreal, Texas, a census-designated place in Starr County, Texas
- Vista Center, New Jersey, a census-designated place within Jackson Township, in Ocean County, New Jersey (view)
- Vista West, Wyoming, a census-designated place in Natrona County, Wyoming
- Villanueva, New Mexico, a census-designated place in San Miguel County, New Mexico
- Villas, Florida, a census-designated place in Lee County, Florida
- Vista Santa Rosa, California, a census-designated place in Riverside County, California
- Washington-on-the-Brazos (also known as Washington), an unincorporated area along the Brazos River in Washington County, Texas
- West Alto Bonito, Texas, a census-designated place in Starr County, Texas
- West Lima, Wisconsin, an unincorporated community in Bloom, Richland County, Wisconsin
- White Mesa, Utah, a census-designated place in San Juan County, Utah, (White Table)
- Yucatan Landing, Louisiana, an unincorporated community in Tensas Parish, Louisiana
- Yucatan, Minnesota, an incorporated community in Yucatan Township, Houston County, Minnesota
- Yucatan, Missouri, an unincorporated community in Callaway County, Missouri
- Zamora, California, an unincorporated community in Yolo County, California

=== Districts and boroughs ===
- Armada Road Multi-Family District, a U.S. historic district in Venice, Florida (army)
- Bogota, New Jersey, a borough in Bergen County, New Jersey
- Corona del Mar, a community within Newport Beach, Orange County, California, meaning "crown of the sea"
- Matamoras, Pennsylvania, borough in Pike County, Pennsylvania
- North Villa Rica Commercial Historic District, in Villa Rica, Georgia
- Saltillo, Pennsylvania, a borough in Huntingdon County, Pennsylvania (named so after the Mexican War Battle of Saltillo of 23 October 1840)
- San Ysidro, California, district of the City of San Diego
- Raton Downtown Historic District, a Registered Historic District in Raton, New Mexico (mouse)
- Valencia, Pennsylvania, a borough in Butler County, Pennsylvania

=== Neighborhoods ===
- Alta Vista (Salt Lake County), a neighborhood within Sandy, Utah.
- Alta Vista (Weber County), Utah, a neighborhood in Ogden's northeast side.
- Andalusia, Pennsylvania, historical neighborhood in Bensalem Township, Bucks County, Pennsylvania
- Casa Linda Estates, Dallas, Texas (Cute house)
- Colonia, Oxnard, California (colony)
- Corona, Queens, a lower middle class to middle-class neighborhood in the New York City borough of Queens (crown)
- Del Cerro, San Diego, a hilly neighborhood in the city of San Diego, California (of the hill)
- Delray, Michigan, a neighborhood and former incorporated village, located on the southwest side of Detroit, Michigan (from Del Rey, "of the King", Mexico)
- Del Rey, Los Angeles, California, a small district in the west side of Los Angeles (of the king)
- Del Ruby, Sandy, Utah
- El Rey Park, a neighborhood in Salt Lake City's East Bench
- El Sereno, Los Angeles (the Serene)
- Encanto, San Diego, a hilly urban neighborhood located in the southeastern region of San Diego, California (charm)
- Estrella, Goodyear, a mixed-use master-planned community located in Goodyear, Arizona (star)
- Granada Hills, Los Angeles, California
- Guadalupe, Utah, within Salt Lake City's 3rd district
- Joaquin, Utah, a neighborhood in Provo, Utah, named after a Ute translator that aided the Domínguez–Escalante expedition in exploring the area in the 18th century.
- Laguna Honda (also called Forest Hill), San Francisco, California (deep small lake)
- La Barranca, Cottonwood Creek Valley, Utah
- La Cresta, Cottonwood Heights, Utah
- La Jolla, California, neighborhood in San Diego, California (a combination of a Spanish and a Luiseno word)
- La Joya Heights, Utah, neighborhood within greater Salt Lake City
- Las Palmas, Fresno, California, neighborhood (and former unincorporated community) in Fresno County, California
- Los Feliz, Los Angeles, in California (the happy)
- Little Havana, neighborhood of Miami, Florida
- Little Mexico, neighborhood of Dallas, Texas
- Mesa del Monte, a neighborhood in North Ogden, Utah
- Mira Mesa, San Diego, a neighborhood in the northern part of the city of San Diego, California (table view)
- Miramar, San Diego, a neighborhood in the northern part of the city of San Diego, California (sea view)
- Montecito Heights, Los Angeles (small mount)
- Monterey Hills, Los Angeles
- Playa del Rey, Los Angeles, a beachside community in Los Angeles, California
- Rancho Peñasquitos, San Diego, a community in the northeastern part of the city of San Diego, California (ranch little cliffs)
- San Carlos, San Diego, neighborhood in San Diego, California
- San Pedro, Los Angeles, neighborhood within the City of Los Angeles, California
- San Roque, California, residential neighborhood in Santa Barbara, California
- Santa Clara, Eugene, Oregon, a neighborhood in Eugene, Oregon
- Santa Fe, Oakland, California, a small neighborhood in North Oakland, California.
- South El Rancho, a neighborhood in Ogden, Utah
- Spanish Town, Baton Rouge, Louisiana, neighborhood in Baton Rouge, Louisiana
- The Castro, San Francisco, a neighborhood in San Francisco, California
- Tierrasanta, San Diego, a neighborhood in the city of San Diego, California (holy land)
- Trinidad, Washington, D.C., neighborhood located in Ward 5, in the northeast quadrant of Washington, D.C. (the area got its name from 19th century speculator James Barry, who had once lived on the Caribbean island, whose name is of Spanish origin. Trinity)
- Valencia, California, neighborhood of Santa Clarita in Los Angeles County, California
- Val Verda, Utah, a neighborhood of Bountiful, Utah. Formerly independent of Bountiful, the area was annexed into the city's limits in the 1990s.
- Valverde, Denver, a neighborhood in the City and Denver County, Colorado
- Vega Park, Utah, a neighborhood within Magna, Utah
- Vista Plat, a neighborhood adjacent to South Valley Regional Airport in West Jordan, Utah

=== Towns and townships ===
- Acala, Texas, a ghost town in Hudspeth County, Texas (named after Acala Municipality, Chiapas, Mexico)
- Agua Caliente, Arizona, in Maricopa County, Arizona, a place north of the Gila River near Hyder, Arizona ("hot water". The place is nearby hot springs which were originally used by the local Indians)
- Alamo, Indiana, a town in Montgomery County, Indiana, after for the Alamo in San Antonio, Texas
- Alta, Indiana, a town in Vermillion County, Indiana
- Alta, Utah, a town in Salt Lake County, Utah (tall in female)
- Altamont, Utah, a town in northeastern Utah
- Alto, Arizona, a ghost town in Santa Cruz County, Arizona
- Alto, Georgia, town in Banks, Habersham, and Hall counties in the U.S. state of Georgia (tall in male)
- Alto, Texas, a town in Cherokee County, Texas
- Annabella, Utah, a town in Sevier County, Utah
- Anahuac, Texas (name has various meanings, including "center", "world", and "city", but it also means "capital")
- Arinosa, Utah a ghost town in Utah's expansive Great Salt Lake Desert
- Arispie Township, Bureau County, Illinois (named after Arizpe, Sonora, in Mexico)
- Arriba, Colorado, a Statutory Town located in Lincoln County, Colorado (top)
- Armada Township, Buffalo County, Nebraska (Army)
- Avilla, Indiana, a town in Allen Township, Noble County, in Indiana (named after Ávila, Spain)
- Barro, Utah, a ghost town in Utah's Great Salt Lake Desert
- Bexar, Alabama, a rural, mostly agricultural town in extreme west Marion County, Alabama (after Béjar, Salamanca)
- Blanca, Colorado, a Statutory Town in Costilla County, Colorado (white in female)
- Boca Grande, Florida, a town on Gasparilla Island, Florida (big mouth)
- Calabasas, Arizona, a ghost town in Rio Rico, a suburb of Nogales in Santa Cruz County, Arizona (Spanish for "pumpkins")
- Camp Verde, Arizona, town in Yavapai County, Arizona (green)
- Campo, Colorado, a Statutory Town located in Baca County, Colorado (camp)
- Canelo, Arizona, ghost town in eastern Santa Cruz County, Arizona (derivative of the Spanish world "canela" (cinnamon))
- Casa, Arkansas, town in Perry County, Arkansas (house)
- Cadiz, Indiana, town in Harrison Township, Henry County, Indiana
- Castile (town), in Wyoming County, New York
- Chino Valley, Arizona, a town in Yavapai County, Arizona ("Curvy Valley")
- Churubusco, Indiana, a town in Whitley County, Indiana, after the Battle of Churubusco
- Cimarron City, Oklahoma, is a town in Logan County, Oklahoma (maroon)
- Cimarron Township, Gray County, Kansas
- Cinco Bayou, Florida, a town in Okaloosa County, Florida ("Five Bayou")
- Cisco, Utah, a ghost town in Grand County, Utah
- Corona, South Dakota, a town in Roberts County, South Dakota (crown)
- Cuba, Alabama, a town in Sumter County, Alabama
- Cuchillo, New Mexico, a ghost town in Sierra County, New Mexico (knife)
- Del Norte, Colorado, a Statutory Town in and the county seat of Rio Grande County, Colorado (From North)
- Dolores, Colorado, Statutory Town in Montezuma County, Colorado
- Ebro, Florida, a town in Washington County, Florida (named after the Ebro River area in Spain)
- Frisco, Utah a ghost town in western central Utah
- Granada, Colorado, a Statutory Town in Prowers County, Colorado (named after the city of Granada, Spain, itself Spanish for "pomegranate")
- Gomez, Texas, a small town in Terry County, Texas
- Guadalupe, Arizona, a town in Maricopa County, Arizona
- Granada, Colorado, a Statutory town in Prowers County, Colorado
- Havana, Florida, a town in Gadsden County, Florida
- Huachuca City, Arizona, a town in Cochise County, Arizona
- Hermosa, South Dakota, a town in Custer County, South Dakota (beautiful)
- Ignacio, Colorado, a Statutory Town in La Plata County, Colorado
- Jalapa, Indiana, a town in Grant County, Indiana, after Xalapa, Veracruz, Mexico
- La Jara, Colorado, a Statutory Town in Conejos County, Colorado ("The Rockrose")
- La Panza, California, formerly a gold boom town, a Ghost towns in San Luis Obispo County, California (The belly)
- La Paz, Indiana, a town in North Township, Marshall County, Indiana (called after La Paz, Bolivia)
- La Plata, Utah, a ghost town in northern Utah, named for the silver boom the area experienced in the 1890s.
- Leon, New York, town in Cattaraugus County, New York (the name is derived from the former Kingdom of León in Spain)
- Leon, Oklahoma, town in Love County, Oklahoma
- Leon, West Virginia, a town in Mason County, West Virginia
- Lima, New York, town in Livingston County, New York
- Lima, Montana, town in Beaverhead County, Montana
- Lima, Grant County, Wisconsin, a town in Wisconsin
- Lima, Pepin County, Wisconsin, a town in Wisconsin
- Lima, Rock County, Wisconsin, a town in Wisconsin
- Lima, Sheboygan County, Wisconsin, a town
- Limon, Colorado, Statutory Town that is the most populous town in Lincoln County, Colorado (Lemon)
- Lobo, Texas, a ghost town in Culberson County, Texas (wolf)
- Los Gatos, California (Spanish for "The Cats"), an incorporated town in Santa Clara County, California
- Madrid, Alabama, a town in Houston County, Alabama (named after the Spanish capital city Madrid)
- Madrid, Colorado, a ghost town in Las Animas County, Colorado
- Madrid, New York, a town in St. Lawrence County, New York
- Marana, Arizona, a town in Pima County, Arizona, located northwest of Tucson, with a small portion in Pinal County, Arizona (derived from maraña, meaning "thicket")
- Mariposa Township, Saunders County, Nebraska (butterfly)
- Mexico, Maine, a town in Oxford County, Maine (the name was inspired by local sympathy for Mexico's 1810–1821 fight for independence from Spain)
- Mexico, New York, town in the northeast part of Oswego County, New York
- Mogollon, former mining town located in the Mogollon Mountains in Catron County, New Mexico. The place was called after the governor of colonial New Mexico Juan Ignacio Flores Mogollon (1712 - 1715)
- Montana, Wisconsin, a town in Buffalo County, Wisconsin
- Monterey, Indiana, town in Tippecanoe Township, Pulaski County, Indiana
- Moraga, California, suburban incorporated town located in Contra Costa County, California
- Moro Township, Madison County, Illinois (Blackberry of Moor man Township)
- Panama, Oklahoma, town in Le Flore County, Oklahoma
- Patagonia, Arizona, a town in Santa Cruz County, Arizona
- Pedro, South Dakota, a ghost town
- Perla, Arkansas, town in Hot Spring County, Arkansas (Pearl)
- Pila Blanca, Texas, a ghost town in Duval County
- Ponce de Leon, Florida, a town in Holmes County, Florida (named after Spanish explorer Juan Ponce de León)
- Ponce Inlet, Florida, a town in Volusia County, Florida
- Rancho Viejo, Texas, a town in Cameron County, Texas (of Spanish old ranch)
- Rio, Florida, a small town in Martin County, Florida
- Rosa, Alabama, town in Blount County, Alabama (rose)
- Refugio, Texas, in Refugio County, Texas ("Shelter")
- Salduro, Utah (also Salduro Siding), a ghost town located in Tooele County, Utah.
- Salero, Arizona, a ghost town in the Santa Rita Mountains of Santa Cruz County, Arizona
- Sandoval Township, Marion County, Illinois
- San Felipe de Austin, a town in Austin County, Texas. The town was named that way by the governor of the Mexican Texas Luciano García.
- San Simeon, California, a town and census-designated place on the Pacific coast of San Luis Obispo County, California ("Saint Simeon")
- Santa Anna, Texas, a town in Coleman County, Texas
- Santa Clara, New York, a town in Franklin County, New York
- Santa Fe Township, Clinton County, Illinois
- Santa Rosa, Texas, a town in Cameron County, Texas
- Salamanca (town), New York, in Cattaraugus County, New York
- Saltillo, Indiana, a town in Brown Township, Washington County, Indiana (named so in commemoration of Saltillo, Mexico, the location of a battle in the Mexican–American War)
- Saltillo, Mississippi, a town in Lee County, Mississippi.
- Saltillo, Tennessee, a town in Hardin County, Tennessee
- Seville Township, Michigan, in Gratiot County, Michigan
- Superior, Colorado, a Statutory Town in Boulder County, Colorado (top)
- Tiburon, California, an incorporated town in Marin County, California ("shark")
- Vera Cruz, Indiana, a town in Harrison Township, Wells County, Indiana
- Yucatan Township, Houston County, Minnesota

=== Villages ===
- Alhambra, Illinois, a village in Madison County, Illinois (named after the Spanish palace of la Alhambra)
- Andalusia, Illinois ("Andalucia")
- Arena, Wisconsin, a village in Iowa County, Wisconsin (sand)
- Armada, Michigan, a small village in Macomb County, Michigan (army)
- Bonita, Louisiana, a village in Morehouse Parish, Louisiana (beautiful)
- Cadiz, Ohio, a village in Harrison County, Ohio
- Capitan, New Mexico, a village in Lincoln County, New Mexico (captain)
- Camargo, Illinois, a village in Douglas County, Illinois (named after Camargo, Chihuahua, in Mexico)
- Castile (village), Wyoming County, New York
- Cerro Gordo, Illinois, village in Piatt County, Illinois ("Fat Hill")
- Cimarron, New Mexico, a village in Colfax County, New Mexico (maroon)
- Cordova, Nebraska, a village in Seward County, Nebraska (called after Cordova, Spain)
- Coleta, Illinois, a village in Whiteside County, Illinois (pigtail)
- Corrales, New Mexico, a village in Sandoval County, New Mexico
- Corona, New Mexico, a village in Lincoln County, New Mexico (crown)
- De Soto, Illinois (named for Hernando de Soto, the discoverer of the Mississippi River)
- De Soto, Wisconsin, a village straddling Vernon and Crawford counties in Wisconsin.
- El Portal, Florida, a village in Miami-Dade County, Florida ("The big Gate", also can mean "The Portal")
- Estral Beach, Michigan, village in Monroe County, Michigan ("Star") (from (d)estral, "Small Hatchet")
- Hidalgo, Illinois, village in Jasper County, Illinois ("Nobleman of the lowest grade")
- Lima, Illinois, village in Adams County, Illinois
- Lima (village), New York, village in Livingston County, New York
- Los Lunas, New Mexico, a village in Valencia County, New Mexico (The Moons)
- Los Ranchos de Albuquerque, New Mexico (the ranches)
- Madrid, Nebraska, a village in Perkins County, Nebraska
- Matamoras, Ohio, a village in Washington County, Ohio
- Mexico (village), New York, a village in Oswego County, New York
- Modesto, Illinois, a village in Macoupin County, Illinois
- Palos Park, Illinois, affluent village in Cook County, Illinois (called after Palos de la Frontera, Spain)
- Panama, Illinois, village in Montgomery and Bond counties, Illinois
- Panama, Nebraska, village in Lancaster County, Nebraska
- Panama, New York, village in Chautauqua County, New York
- Parral, Ohio, a village in Tuscarawas County, Ohio (named after Parral, Chihuahua, in Mexico)
- Rio, Illinois, a village in Knox County, Illinois (river)
- Rio, West Virginia, a village in Hampshire County, West Virginia
- Rio, Wisconsin, a village in Columbia County, Wisconsin
- Rio Grande, Ohio, a village in Gallia County, Ohio
- Roca, Nebraska, village in Lancaster County, Nebraska (rock)
- San Jose, Illinois, village in Logan County and Mason counties, Illinois
- Sandoval, Illinois, in Marion County, Illinois
- Santa Clara, New Mexico, a village in Grant County, New Mexico
- Seville, Ohio, in Medina County, Ohio
- Spanish Lake community, in Natchitoches Parish, Louisiana
- Tijeras, New Mexico, in Bernalillo County, New Mexico (scissors)
- Valparaiso, Nebraska, a village in Saunders County, Nebraska
- Vista, Missouri, a village in St. Clair County, Missouri (view)

== Former settlements ==
- Agua Mansa, California, a former settlement in San Bernardino County, California ("Gentle Water")
- Añal, New Mexico, a ghost town
- Alisal, California, was a Californio settlement located on the lands of the Rancho Santa Rita near the site of an Indian ranchera ("The Sycamores")
- Arinosa, Utah, a former settlement in the Great Salt Lake Desert, supposedly only a few miles east of the Tree of Utah
- Alvarado, California, former settlement in and former county seat of Alameda County, California, now annexed to Union City (possibly named for the Spanish conquistador Pedro de Alvarado)
- Barro, Utah, a former settlement in Utah's expansive west desert. (Mud)
- Boca, California, a former settlement in Nevada County, California (named by the railroad Boca (Spanish for "mouth" and "river mouth") because it was near the mouth of the Little Truckee River)
- Cisco, Utah a former settlement in Grand County, Utah
- Hacienda, California, former settlement in Alameda County, California ("[Big] Farm")
- La Placita, California, former settlement in Riverside County, California ("The Small Plaza")
- La Plata, Utah, a former mining town in northern Utah
- Merienda, California, former settlement in Niles Canyon, in Alameda County, California (Snack)
- Rio Bravo (former settlement), California, former settlement in Kern County, California
- Salduro, Utah, a former settlement located in Utah's west desert
- San Carlos, Inyo County, California, former settlement in Inyo County, California
- San Miguel de los Noches, California, former settlement in Kern County (Saint Michael of the Nights)
- San Salvador, California, a former settlement replaced by La Placita, California, and Agua Mansa, California, both of which are also ghost towns
- Santa Rosa de Lima, New Mexico, a former settlement in Rio Arriba County, New Mexico
- Tres Alamos, Arizona, a former settlement in Cochise County, Arizona

== Historic places (still standing) ==
=== Forts ===
- Castillo de San Marcos, in Saint Augustine, Florida
- Fort Barrancas, Florida
- Fort Buenaventura, Utah
- Fort Matanzas National Monument, Florida
- Los Adaes, Texas

=== Missions ===
- Alamo Mission in San Antonio, Texas
- Diego Sepúlveda Adobe, California
- Las Flores Estancia, California
- La Purisima Mission, California
- Mission Nuestra Señora de la Soledad, California
- Mission San Antonio de Padua, California
- Mission San Cayetano de Calabazas, Arizona
- Mission Santa Clara de Asís, California
- Mission Concepcion, Texas
- Mission Los Santos Ángeles de Guevavi, Arizona
- Mission Santa Barbara, California
- Mission San Buenaventura, California
- Mission San Carlos Borromeo de Carmelo, California
- Mission San Fernando Rey de España, California
- Mission San Francisco de Asís, California
- Mission San Francisco de la Espada, Texas
- Mission San Gabriel Arcángel, California
- Mission Santa Inés, California
- Mission San José (California)
- Mission San José (Texas)
- Mission San José de Tumacácori, Arizona
- Mission San Juan Bautista, California
- Mission San Juan Capistrano (Texas)
- Mission San Luis Rey de Francia, California
- Mission San Luis Obispo de Tolosa, California
- Santa Margarita de Cortona Asistencia, California
- Mission San Miguel Arcángel, California
- Mission San Xavier del Bac, Arizona
- Nombre de Dios (mission), Florida
- Nuestra Señora de Guadalupe de Tolomato, Georgia
- San Antonio de Pala Asistencia, California
- San Estevan Del Rey Mission Church, New Mexico
- San Pedro y San Pablo Asistencia, California
- Socorro Mission, Texas

=== Presidios ===
- Presidio La Bahía, in Goliad, Texas
- Presidio San Antonio de Bexar, San Antonio, Texas
- Presidio Santa Cruz de Terrenate, Arizona
- Presidio of Santa Barbara, California
- Presidio of Monterey, California
- Presidio of San Diego, California
- Presidio of San Sabá, Texas

=== Ranchos and Spanish lands ===
- Atrisco Land Grant, New Mexico
- Rancho El Alisal, in Salinas, Monterey, California
- Rancho San Antonio (Lugo), in San Antonio, Texas
- Rancho Calleguas, in Ventura, California
- La Habra, in Orange, California
- Rancho Posa de los Ositos, in Monterey, California
- Rancho San Rafael, in Los Angeles, California
- Rancho San Vicente, in Soledad, Monterey, California
- San Miguel del Vado Land Grant, New Mexico

== Islands ==
- Alameda Island, California ("Poplar Grove")
- Alcatraz Island, California ("Pelican")
- Angel Island (California) (derived of his original Spanish name Isla de los Ángeles)
- Año Nuevo Island, Northern California ("New Year" Island)
- Asuncion Island, one of the Northern Mariana Islands
- Bahia Honda Key, an island in the Florida Keys (deep bay)
- Brazos Island, a barrier island on the Gulf Coast of Texas
- Boca Chica Key, Florida ("Small Mouth" Key)
- Camano Island, Washington (after explorer Jacinto Caamaño)
- Dry Tortugas, a group of islands in the Florida Keys in the United States (Dry turtle)
- Farallon Islands, in San Francisco, California (from Farallones: "High Cliffs")
- Farallon de Medinilla, an uninhabited small island in the Northern Mariana Islands (Medinilla ´s Rock)
- Farallon de Pajaros, also known as Urracas, a small uninhabited volcanic island, the northernmost island in the Northern Mariana Islands chain (Birds´ Rock or Magpies)
- Fidalgo Island, Washington (named after the Spanish explorer and cartographer Salvador Fidalgo)
- Key West, Florida (Anglicized from Cayo Hueso: "Bone Cay")
- Key Largo, Florida ("Wide Key")
- Lopez Island, in San Juan Islands, Washington
- Matagorda Island, a barrier island on the coast of Texas
- Perdido Key, Florida ("Lost Key")
- Revillagigedo Island, Alaska (after viceroy of New Spain Juan Vicente de Güemes, 2nd Count of Revillagigedo)
- San Clemente Island, California
- San Juan Islands (Alaska)
- San Juan Islands, in the Washington state
- San Juan Island, the second-largest and most populous of the San Juan Islands, in Washington
- San Miguel Island, the westernmost of California's Channel Islands
- San Nicolas Island, California
- Santa Barbara Island, California
- Santa Catalina Island, California
- Santa Cruz Island, California
- Santa Rosa Island, California
- Santa Rosa Island, Florida ("St. Rose" Island)
- Spanish Harbor Key, island in the lower Florida Keys.
- Sutil Island, California
- Yerba Buena Island, sits in the San Francisco Bay between San Francisco and Oakland, California (named after the former name of the city of San Francisco, Yerba Buena, which was changed in 1847. From the Spanish Good herb)

== Natural places ==
=== Bays and inlets ===
- Bodega Bay, California
- Castro Cove, an embayment of the San Pablo in Richmond, California
- Matagorda Bay, a large estuary bay on the Texas coast
- Matanzas Bay, in St. Johns County, Florida
- Matanzas Inlet, a channel in Florida
- Monterey Bay, California
- Nueces Bay, a northwestern extension of Corpus Christi Bay in the San Patricio and Nueces counties of Texas
- Padre Bay, located in Kane and San Juan counties, Utah. The bay is the largest expanse of open water in Lake Powell
- Perdido Bay, in Perdido River, a designated Outstanding Florida Waters river, in Baldwin County, Alabama and Escambia County, Florida, United States ("Lost")
- San Carlos Bay
- San Francisco Bay, California
- San Pablo Bay, California
- San Pedro Bay (California)
- Strait of Juan de Fuca, in the northwest
- Haro Strait, between the Strait of Georgia and the Strait of Juan de Fuca, in the northwest.
- Rosario Strait, in northern Washington state
- Santa Rosa Sound, Florida

=== Forest ===
- De Soto National Forest, in Mississippi
- Los Padres National Forest, a United States national forest in southern and central California (the parents)
- Manti-La Sal National Forest, Utah
- San Juan National Forest, Colorado
- San Isabel National Forest, in central Colorado
- Santa Fe National Forest (part), New Mexico
- Sierra National Forest, in California, United States
- Plumas National Forest, California
- Rio Grande National Forest, Colorado (Big River)
- San Bernardino National Forest, in San Bernardino County, California

=== Mountains, hills, rock, ranges, caves and volcanos ===
- Abajo Mountains, also called the Blue Mountains, is a small mountain range west of Monticello, Utah (below)
- Abajo Peak, the highest peak in the Abajo Range, located in San Juan County, Utah
- Alhambra Rock, a prominent sandstone formation and scenic attraction near Mexican Hat, in San Juan County, Utah.
- Blanca Peak, a mountain in Colorado (White Peak)
- Brazos Mountains, a range in far northern Rio Arriba County, New Mexico (arms)
- Caballo Mountains, New Mexico (Horse Mountains)
- Caja del Rio, a dissected plateau, of volcanic origin, which covers approximately 84,000 acres of land in northern Santa Fe County, New Mexico (box of the river)
- Canelo Hills, a range of low mountains or hills in eastern Santa Cruz County, Arizona (Brown Hills)
- Capitan Mountains, a mountain range in Lincoln County, New Mexico (captain)
- Ciervo Hills, low mountain range in west Fresno County, California (Deer Hills)
- Cimmaron Range, in southwest Colorado (maroon)
- Corona Arch, a sandstone arch in Moab, Utah
- Delano Peak, a prominent peak in the Tushar Mountain Range, in central Utah
- Domínguez Butte, a butte in San Juan County, Utah, named after Francisco Atanasio Domínguez
- Dos Cabezas Mountains, in southeasternmost Arizona (Two heads)
- El Capitan, California, a rock formation (the Captain)
- El Capitan (Texas), a peak in Culberson County, Texas
- Entrada Sandstone, a prominent geological formation within the San Rafael Group in central Utah
- Frisco Peak, a peak in the San Francisco Mountain Range located in western Utah
- Grand Mesa, a large mesa in western Colorado
- Guadalupe Mountains, a mountain range located in West Texas and southeastern New Mexico (named after Guadalupe, Cáceres, Spain)
- Huerfano Butte, an isolated volcanic neck in Huerfano County, Colorado (named "Huerfano" by early Spanish explorers of southern Colorado. Of Spanish Orphan).
- Jemez Mountains, a volcanic group of mountains in New Mexico
- La Panza Range, a mountain range in the Central Coast of California
- La Plata Mountains, small subrange of the San Juan Mountains in the southwestern part of Colorado (silver)
- La Sal Mountains, in Grand and San Juan County counties, Utah along the Utah/Colorado border (The Salt Mountains)
- Little Rincon Mountains, small range of mountains, lying to the east of the Rincon Mountains, at Tucson, Arizona ("Corner")
- Little San Bernardino Mountains, in California
- Luna Peak (Washington), a mountain in the US (moon)
- Mancos Mesa, a prominent mesa and wildlife sanctuary near Lake Powell, in San Juan County, Utah
- Manzano Mountains, a small mountain range in the central part of New Mexico (apple tree)
- Manzano Peak, the highest peak in the Manzano Mountains
- Mesa Arch, a prominent natural arch and tourist destination in Canyonlands National Park, Utah.
- Mesa de Maya, volcanic tableland in Colorado
- Mexican Mountain, a massive, isolated erosion remnant and wilderness area located in the eastern San Rafael Swell near Green River, Utah
- Mogollon Mountains, of the San Francisco River in Grant and Catron counties of southwestern New Mexico. These Mountains were named for the governor of Spanish New Mexico Juan Ignacio Flores Mogollon.
- Monte Cristo Range, a mountain range in northeastern Utah
- Mosquito Range, Rocky Mountains range in central Colorado
- Mosquito Pass, a high mountain pass in the Mosquito Range
- Mount Vaca, located in northern California (was named so for Juan Manuel Cabeza Vaca (1782-1856), who with Juan Felipe Pena received in 1843 the Rancho Los Putos Mexican land grant, which included the peak that now bears Vaca's name)
- Nacimiento Mountains, New Mexico, also called San Pedro Mountains (Birth Mountains or Saint Peter Mountains)
- Negro Mountain, Pennsylvania and Maryland, United States (Black Mountain)
- Padres Butte, a prominent butte in San Juan County, Utah
- Palomar Mountain, a mountain ridge in the Peninsular Ranges in northern San Diego County, California (pigeon roost)
- Palos Verdes Hills, California (Green Stick)
- Patagonia Mountains, a 15 mile long mountain range south of the Santa Rita Mountains, Arizona.
- Pinto Arch, a sandstone arch near Moab, Utah
- Point Reyes, a prominent cape in Northern California (Point of the Kings)
- Puente Hills, a chain of hills, one of the lower Transverse Ranges, in an unincorporated area in eastern Los Angeles County, California
- Raton Pass - mountain pass on the Santa Fe Trail along the Colorado-New Mexico border in the United States (Mouse Pass)
- Redonda Mesa, a tall mesa located in the Southern Santa Ana Mountains near the Pacific Ocean (round table)
- Rincon Mountains, mountain range east of Tucson, Arizona ("Corner", "Nook")
- Robledo Mountains, a mountain range in Doña Ana County, New Mexico just northwest of Las Cruces
- Sacramento Mountains (California) (are also named for the Sacramento Wash and Sacramento Valley (Arizona))
- Sacramento Mountains (New Mexico), a mountain range in the south-central part of New Mexico
- San Bernardino Mountains, high mountain range in Southern California
- San Emigdio Mountains, part of the Transverse Ranges in Southern California
- San Francisco Mountains, a mountain range located in western Utah
- San Gabriel Mountains, mountain range located in northern Los Angeles County and western San Bernardino County, California
- San Gorgonio Pass, a gap on the rim of the Great Basin between the San Bernardino Mountains to the north and the San Jacinto Mountains to the south
- San Gorgonio Mountain, also known locally as Mount San Gorgonio, or Old Greyback, is the highest peak in Southern California and the Transverse Ranges (Spanish missionaries in the area during the early 17th century named the peak after Saint Gorgonius)
- San Jacinto Mountains, a mountain range east of Los Angeles in southern California
- San Joaquin Hills, in Orange County, California
- San Jose Hills, a part of the Transverse Ranges located in Eastern Los Angeles County, California, marking the border between the San Gabriel Valley and the Pomona Valley in the Inland Empire
- San Juan Mountains, in southwestern Colorado
- San Luis Mountains, in Pima County, Arizona
- San Mateo Peak, at the western end of the ridge running west then northwest from Elsinore Peak to Morrell Canyon, California
- San Pedro Arroyo Formation, a geologic formation in New Mexico (creek)
- San Pitch Mountains, a mountain range located in Sanpete and Juab counties, Utah
- San Rafael Hills, mountain range in Los Angeles County, California
- San Rafael Reef, a large geological feature in the central Utah desert
- Sandia Mountains, a mountain range located in Bernalillo and Sandoval counties, New Mexico (watermelon)
- Sangre de Cristo Mountains, the southernmost subrange of the Rocky Mountains. They are located in southern Colorado and northern New Mexico in the United States (Blood of Christ).
- Sangre de Cristo Range, called also the East Range, is located in the San Luis Valley, is mountain range of the Rocky Mountains in southern Colorado.
- Santa Ana Mountains, a short mountain range near Santa Ana, California (saint)
- Santa Catalina Mountains, north, and northeast of Tucson, Arizona
- Santa Clara Volcano, a volcanic field and lava flow in southwest Utah.
- Santa Cruz Mountains, California
- Santa Lucia Mountains, a mountain range in coastal central California
- Santa Margarita Mountains, California
- Santa Rosa Range, in northern Nevada
- Santa Rita Mountains, southeast of Tucson, Arizona
- Santa Rosa Mountains (California)
- Santa Susana Mountains, a transverse range of mountains in Southern California, north of the city of Los Angeles
- Santa Ynez Mountains, west coast of North America
- Santos Trail System, a network of mountain bike trails outside of Ocala, Florida (saints)
- Sierra Blanca (Colorado), a mountain range
- Sierra Blanca (New Mexico), a mountain range (White Mountain saw)
- Sierra Madre Mountains (California), a mountain range in northern Santa Barbara County, California
- Sierra Madre Range (Wyoming), a mountain range in the south central portion of the state
- Sierra Nevada, between the Central Valley of California and the Basin and Range Province
- Sierra Valley, in Plumas and Sierra counties, California
- Tejon Pass, a mountain pass, between the southwest end of the Tehachapi Mountains and northeastern San Emigdio Mountains (badger)
- Temblor Range, a mountain range within the California Coast Ranges, at the southwestern extremity of the San Joaquin Valley in California (tremor)
- Uinta Mountain Range, a prominent range in northeastern Utah, originally named "La Sierra Blanca de Los Lagunas" by the Domínguez–Escalante expedition in the 1770s
- Vaca Mountains, a mountain range in Napa County, California (was named so for the Vaca family, who, along with their partners the Pena family, were among the earliest white settlers in the area)
- Vaqueros sandstone, a sedimentary rock formation in the western United States
- Valles Caldera National Preserve (part), volcanic caldera in the Jemez Mountains of northern New Mexico (Boiler Valley)
- Ventana Cave, a National Historic Landmark in Arizona, U.S.
- Ventana Double Cone, a twin mountaintop in the Ventana Wilderness (window. Early explorers gave the Ventana Double Cone its name because near its summit is a ledge that forms a small slot, or window)
- Verdugo Mountains, a small, rugged mountain range of the Transverse Ranges system, located just south of the western San Gabriel Mountains in Los Angeles County, Southern California (executioner)
- Yegua Formation, a geologic formation in Texas (mare or female horse)

=== Regions ===
This is not an exhaustive list.

- Albuquerque Basin, one of the largest and deepest of the structural basins in the Rio Grande rift and contains the city of Albuquerque, New Mexico.
- Brazos Valley, a region in Texas (a subsection of the larger Central Texas region)
- Canyons of the Escalante, a desert region surrounding the Escalante River and its tributaries in southern Utah
- Cape Alava, Washington (named after basque explorer Don José Manuel de Álava)
- Cape Blanco, Oregon (named by Martin de Aguliar for its white appearance)
- Cape Canaveral, Florida (Anglicized from Cabo Cañaveral)
- Cape Nuñez, a headland of Nunez Peninsula
- Cimarron National Grassland, in southwest Kansas (maroon)
- Gulf of Santa Catalina, between California and Baja California (Mexico)
- High Sierra Trail, in California, United States
- Llano Estacado, Southwestern United States, between the East of New Mexico and Northern Texas ("Staked Plain")
- Los Angeles Basin, coastal sediment-filled plain located at the north end of the Peninsular Ranges province
- Marquez crater, an impact crater in the US state of Texas
- Mogollon Rim a topographical and geological feature cutting across Arizona. It was called for the governor of Spanish New Mexico Juan Ignacio Flores Mogollon.
- Nueces Strip or Wild Horse Desert is the area of south Texas between the Nueces River and the Rio Grande (nuts)
- Padre Point, a cape on the south shore of Lake Powell in San Juan County, Utah
- Raton Basin, Colorado (mouse basin)
- Rincon Bayou, in the Nueces River delta, and located northwest of Corpus Christi, Texas (corner)
- Rio Grande rift, north-trending continental rift zone between Colorado and Chihuahua, Mexico (big river)
- Rio Grande Valley, a location in south Texas
- San Andreas Fault, continental transform fault that extends roughly 810 miles (1,300 km) through California
- San Francisco Bay Area, a populated region that surrounds the San Francisco and San Pablo estuaries in Northern California
- San Joaquin (soil), an officially designated state insignia, the state soil of California (Sain Joachim)
- San Juan Basin, in the Southwestern United States
- San Lucas AVA, an American Viticultural Area located in Monterey County, California
- San Rafael Swell, a large geological feature in the central Utah desert
- San Pitch Canyons, a pair of canyons adjacent to the San Pitch River located in San Pete County, Utah.
- Sangre de Cristo Formation, a geologic formation in Colorado.
- Santa Ana Canyon, California
- Santa Clara Valley AVA, California wine region in Santa Clara County
- Santa Maria Valley AVA, California wine region
- Tijeras Canyon, a prominent canyon in the central part of New Mexico

=== Rivers and lakes ===
- Arroyo de la Laguna, California (Creek of the little Lake)
- Arroyo Seco (Los Angeles County) (dry stream) seasonal river, canyon, watershed, and cultural area in Los Angeles County, California.
- Arroyo Seco (Salinas River tributary), a major tributary of the Salinas River in central California.
- Blanca Lake, Washington state (white)
- Bonita Creek, in Newport Beach, Orange County, California (pretty)
- Bonita Creek, in San Bernardino National Forest
- Bosque River, Texas (forest)
- Brazos River, localized between New Mexico and Texas (called the Rio de los Brazos de Dios by early Spanish explorers (translated as "The River of the Arms of God")) (Arms River)
- Caballo Lake, New Mexico (horse)
- Cadiz Dry Lake, nearby of Cadiz, California
- Calabazas Creek (Santa Clara County), California (pumpkin)
- Calabazas Creek (Sonoma County), California
- Calaveras Creek, in Texas (skulls)
- Calaveras Creek (California), a northward-flowing stream in Alameda and Santa Clara counties of California
- Calaveras Lake (Texas), a reservoir on Calaveras Creek
- Calaveras River, in the California Central Valley (called so by Spanish explorer Gabriel Moraga when he found many skulls of Native Americans along its banks. skulls)
- Carquinez Strait, narrow tidal strait in northern California (named after the Karkin, a linguistic division of the Ohlone Native Americans who resided on both sides of the strait. From the Spanish karkin)
- Castro Creek, a creek in Richmond, California
- Cimarron River (Arkansas River tributary), a tributary of the Arkansas River with headwaters in New Mexico (maroon)
- Cimarron River (Canadian River tributary), a tributary of the Canadian River entirely within New Mexico
- Cimarron River (Gunnison River tributary), a tributary of the Gunnison River in Colorado
- Conejos River, a tributary of the Rio Grande, in south-central Colorado (rabbits)
- Cristianitos Creek, California (little Christians)
- Cuchillo Negro Creek, stream in Sierra County, New Mexico (Black knife Creek)
- Escalante River, a tributary of the Colorado River in southern Utah
- Estrella River, river in eastern San Luis Obispo County, California (star)
- Green River (Colorado River tributary) (the Spanish friars Escalante and Domínguez had originally named this river "Río Buenaventura" (Buenaventura River) in his expedition in Utah in 1775, but in the early nineteenth century, the Spanish and Mexicans named it "Río Verde", or Green River)
- Guadalupe River (California)
- Huerfano River, tributary of the Arkansas River that flows from a source on Blanca Peak in the Sangre de Cristo Mountains of Colorado (orphan).
- Key Vaca, an island in the middle Florida Keys (cow)
- Laguna Blanca (California) (white little lake)
- Laguna Creek, Elk Grove, California (little lake)
- Laguna Creek (San Mateo County), a tributary of San Mateo Creek in San Mateo County, California
- Laguna Creek (Santa Cruz County), California
- Laguna Lake (California), a lake in northern California
- Lake Barco, a lake in Putnam County, Florida (boat)
- La Plata River (San Juan River tributary), in Colorado (silver)
- Lobos Creek, a stream in San Francisco, California (wolves Creek)
- Lopez River, in Monroe County, Florida
- Los Alamos Canyon Creek
- Los Angeles River, in Los Angeles Country, California.
- Los Vaqueros Reservoir, a man-made lake near Brentwood, California
- Matanzas River, Florida
- Maravillas Creek, Texas (wonders creek)
- Montezuma Creek, a tributary of the San Juan River in central and southern Utah
- Mora River, a river in northeastern New Mexico, tributary of the Canadian River (blackberry)
- Mosquito Lagoon, Florida
- Mosquito Creek (British Columbia), a creek in the Cariboo region of British Columbia.
- Mosquito Creek (Feather River), a California tributary of the North Fork Feather River
- Mosquito Creek (Lake Oroville), a California tributary of the Feather River source
- Mosquito Creek (Pennsylvania), a tributary of the West Branch Susquehanna River
- Mosquito Creek (Virginia), a tributary of Chincoteague Bay
- Mosquito Creek Lake, reservoir in Trumbull County, northeast Ohio
- Nacimiento River, river in southern Monterey County and northern San Luis Obispo County, California (birth)
- Nueces River, a river in Texas (nuts. Early settlers named the river after the numerous pecan trees along its banks)
- Pajaro River, in California (Bird River)
- Patagonia Lake, between southwest of Patagonia, Arizona, and northeast of Nogales, Arizona
- Perdido River, localized between the states of Alabama and Florida (Lost River)
- Piedra River (Colorado), a tributary of the San Juan River (Colorado River tributary) (stone)
- Pinto Creek, collective name for a system of desert mountain streams in southwestern Iron County and Washington County, Utah.
- Rio Brazos (New Mexico), a tributary of the Chama River (Rio Grande), New Mexico (River Arms)
- Río Buenaventura, a semi-fictional waterway made up of several existing rivers in Nevada and Utah's Great Basin Desert region. The river was initially believed to flow from the Rocky Mountains to the Pacific Ocean, though no such direct route ever existed. When the Domínguez–Escalante expedition came across Utah's Green River, a western tributary of the Colorado, it was given the name.
- Rio Grande, localized between the southwest of United States and Mexico (Big River)
- Salinas River (California) ("Salt mines")
- Sacramento River, the principal river of Northern California
- Sacramento Wash, a major drainage of Mohave County, Arizona
- San Antonio River (California), river in southern Monterey County, California
- San Antonio River, a major waterway that originates in central Texas in a cluster of springs in Midtown San Antonio
- San Carlos Lake, Arizona
- San Diego River, in San Diego County, California (named for Saint Didacus of Alcalá)
- San Fernando Creek, Texas
- San Gabriel River (California), through southern Los Angeles County, California
- San Joaquin River, the largest river of Central California
- San Juan Creek, California
- San Juan River (California)
- San Juan River, Utah
- San Leandro Creek, in Northern California (formerly Arroyo de San Leandro)
- San Lorenzo Creek, California
- San Luis Rey River, California (from the mission named for Saint Louis, King of France)
- San Mateo Creek (Southern California)
- San Mateo Creek (San Francisco Bay Area)
- San Miguel River (Colorado)
- San Pedro River (Arizona)
- San Pitch River, Utah
- San Rafael River, a tributary of the Green River in central Utah
- San Saba River (Texas), named by governor of Spanish Texas Juan Antonio Bustillo y Ceballos in 1732. He called it Río de San Sabá de las Nueces (San Saba River of the walnuts)
- San Sebastian River, a tidal channel which flows into Matanzas Bay, Florida
- Santa Ana River, the largest river in Southern California, flows through Santa Ana
- Santa Clara River (California), north of Los Angeles
- Santa Clara River (Utah)
- Santa Cruz River (Arizona), river in southern Arizona, and northern Sonora, Mexico, ("Holy Cross River")
- Spanish Fork River, in northern Utah, originally named "El Rio de Aguas Calientes" by the Dominguez-Escalante Expedition in the 1770s
- Uvas Creek, river of California (grapes creek)
- Verde River, Arizona and Utah (Green River)
- Verdugo Wash, river in the Glendale area of Los Angeles County, California (executioner)
- Yegua Creek, a river in Central Texas and part of the Brazos River drainage basin (mare of female horse)
- Yuba Lake, a reservoir in Sanpete and Juab counties in central Utah

=== Springs and waterfalls ===
- Bonita Falls, a set of waterfalls in the San Bernardino National Forest, formed by Bonita Creek
- DeSoto Falls (Alabama), waterfall located on the West Fork of the Little River near Mentone, Alabama (they are named after Spanish explorer Hernando de Soto)
- DeSoto Falls (Georgia), located in Lumpkin County, Georgia along Frogtown Creek (are named for Spanish explorer Hernando deSoto, who passed through Georgia around 1540)
- San Marcos Springs, Texas
- San Pedro Springs, Texas

=== Valleys ===
- Anza Valley, located in southern Riverside County, California
- Conejo Valley, in region spanning both southeastern Ventura County and northwestern Los Angeles County, Southern California (rabbit)
- Juab Valley, in Juab County, Utah
- Sacramento Valley, portion of the Central Valley (California)
- Sacramento Valley (Arizona), between north–south trending valley west and southwest of Kingman in Mohave County.
- Salinas Valley, west of the San Joaquin Valley and south of San Francisco Bay and the Santa Clara Valley—Silicon Valley, California
- San Fernando Valley, in the Los Angeles metropolitan area of southern California
- San Gabriel Valley, Southern California, lying generally to the east of the city of Los Angeles.
- San Jacinto Valley, in south western Riverside County, California
- San Juan Valley, a valley in southeastern Utah, sometimes called the Dry Valley
- San Joaquin Valley, area of the Central Valley (California)
- San Luis Valley, extensive high-altitude basin in Colorado with a small portion overlapping into New Mexico
- San Pedro Valley (Arizona), in western Cochise County, Arizona
- Sanpete Valley, a valley in Sanpete County, Utah
- San Rafael Valley, in eastern Santa Cruz County, Arizona
- San Rafael Valley, in central Utah
- Santa Clara Valley, runs south-southeast from the southern end of San Francisco Bay in Northern California
- Santa Clara River Valley, a valley in Ventura County, California
- Santa Clarita Valley, part of the upper watershed of Santa Clara River in Southern California.
- Spanish Valley, a valley in San Juan County, Utah, just south of Moab, Utah
- Tooele Valley, Utah in western Utah, bordering Nevada. Originates from "tule", a Spanish word of Aztec origin meaning "bulrush"
- Utah Valley, in northern Utah. Based on a Spanish designation for the Ute People, "Yuta", by the Dominguez-Escalante Expedition in the 1770s. The valley and surrounding area itself were originally named "Nuestra Senora de los Timpanogotiz"
- Verde Valley, in central Arizona (green valley)

=== Wilderness, deserts and dunes ===
- Algodones Dunes, a large erg (sand dune field) located in the southeastern portion of California, near the border with Arizona and the Mexican state of Baja California (cottons).
- Escalante Desert, a desert region located in southwestern Utah
- Manzano Wilderness, in western Torrance County and eastern Valencia County, New Mexico (the region received the name when early Spanish settlers discovered ancient apple trees growing a few miles east of the present-day wilderness)
- San Gorgonio Wilderness, in the San Bernardino Mountains
- San Pedro Parks Wilderness, located in southern Rio Arriba County in northern New Mexico and part of the Santa Fe National Forest
- San Rafael Reef Wilderness, a desert region in central Utah
- Sandia Mountain Wilderness, part of Cibola National Forest, is located east of Albuquerque, New Mexico (watermelon)
- Spanish Peaks Wilderness, in Huerfano County and Las Animas County, Colorado
- Sonoran Desert, a desert in northwestern Mexico and the southwestern United States
- South San Juan Wilderness, a Wilderness area located east of Pagosa Springs, Colorado
- Ventana Wilderness, a Federally designated wilderness located in the Santa Lucia Mountains along the Central Coast of California (window)

=== Wildlife refuges and protected areas ===
- Alamosa National Wildlife Refuge
- Anahuac National Wildlife Refuge (prior to its renaming on March 4, 2025)
- Baca National Wildlife Refuge
- Balcones Canyonlands National Wildlife Refuge
- Blanca Wetlands, Area of Critical Environmental Concern, or Blanca Wildlife Habitat Area, is an area of the San Luis Valley in Colorado, United States, that serves as a refuge for birds, fish and other wildlife (white)
- Bosque del Apache National Wildlife Refuge
- Buenos Aires National Wildlife Refuge
- Cabeza Prieta National Wildlife Refuge
- Canelo Hills Cienega Reserve, a protected area in Canelo Hills, Arizona (brown)
- Farallon National Wildlife Refuge
- Grand Staircase-Escalente National Monument, the largest national monument in the United States, near Kanab, Utah
- Grulla National Wildlife Refuge
- Laguna Atascosa National Wildlife Refuge
- Las Vegas National Wildlife Refuge
- Lower Rio Grande Valley National Wildlife Refuge
- Merced National Wildlife Refuge
- Monte Vista National Wildlife Refuge
- Montezuma National Wildlife Refuge
- Sacramento National Wildlife Refuge
- Sacramento River National Wildlife Refuge
- Salinas River National Wildlife Refuge
- San Andres National Wildlife Refuge
- San Bernard National Wildlife Refuge
- San Bernardino National Wildlife Refuge
- San Diego Bay National Wildlife Refuge
- San Diego National Wildlife Refuge
- San Joaquin River National Wildlife Refuge
- San Juan Islands National Wildlife Refuge
- San Luis National Wildlife Refuge
- San Pablo Bay National Wildlife Refuge
- San Rafael Reef Wilderness, a recently protected wilderness area in central Utah
- Sangre de Cristo National Heritage Area, in Colorado (blood of Christ)
- Santa Ana National Wildlife Refuge
- Sevilleta National Wildlife Refuge
- Tijuana Slough National Wildlife Refuge
- Valle de Oro National Wildlife Refuge

== Parks ==
- Agua Caliente County Park, park with geothermally heated springs. The park is located just west of Anza-Borrego Desert State Park, in eastern San Diego County, California
- Alta Lake State Park, a park in the northwest interior of the state of Washington (tall in female)
- Alta Plaza Park, in San Francisco's Pacific Heights neighborhood
- Anza-Borrego Desert State Park, state park located within the Colorado Desert of southern California. The park takes its name from 18th-century Spanish explorer Juan Bautista de Anza and borrego, the Spanish word for bighorn sheep.
- Brazos Bend State Park, a state park along the Brazos River in Needville, Texas (arms)
- Coronado Heights, hill in Lindsborg, Kansas (named after Francisco Vásquez de Coronado, already that it is alleged to be near the place where Francisco Vásquez de Coronado gave up his search for the seven cities of gold and turned around to return to Mexico).
- Del Norte Park, West Covina, California
- Del Rey Beach State Recreation Site, a state park in Oregon (of king)
- De Soto National Memorial, in Bradenton, Florida
- DeSoto Site Historic State Park, a Florida state park located in Tallahassee, Florida
- Dry Tortugas National Park - National park localized west of Key West, Florida
- Eldorado Park, Scottsdale Arizona
- Encanto Park, Duarte, California
- Fort Buenaventura State Park, in Ogden, Utah
- Fort De Soto Park, in St. Petersburg, Florida (named for Spanish explorer Hernando de Soto)
- Fort Verde State Historic Park, in Camp Verde, Arizona
- Grijalva Park, Orange, California
- Guadelupe Park, Salt Lake City, Utah
- Escalante Petrified Forest State Park, in Escalante, Utah
- Louis H Marrero Park, in Jefferson Parish, Louisiana (founded in honor to Spanish American politician Louis H. Marrero).
- Mesa Verde National Park, in Montezuma County, Colorado
- Modesto Park, Salt Lake City, Utah
- Palomar Mountain State Park, in San Diego County, California (pigeon roost)
- Plumas Park, Reno, Nevada
- Plumas-Eureka State Park, California state park located in the Sierra Nevada and Cascade Range in Plumas County, California
- Presidio of San Francisco, California (former Presidio and, at present, a park)
- Rancho San Rafael Regional Park, in Reno, Nevada
- San Juan Island National Historical Park, on San Juan Island in the state of in Washington
- San Pedro Springs Park, in San Antonio, Texas
- San Pitch Recreation Area, located in the western portion of the Manti-La Sal National Forest and San Pitch Mountains, in central Utah
- Unidad Park, Los Angeles, California
- Verdugo Park, park in the Verdugo Mountains in the eastern San Fernando Valley of Southern California (executioner)
- Vista Park, Salt Lake City, Utah
- Vista Hermosa Park, Los Angeles, California
- Yuba State Park, a state park in Utah's Sanpete and Juab counties

== Peninsulas ==
- Matagorda Peninsula, narrow spit of land on the southeastern coast of Texas
- Palos Verdes Peninsula, California
- San Francisco Peninsula, California
- Tiburon Peninsula, California (of Spanish "Shark")

== Other ==
- Acequia Madre de Valero (San Antonio) ("main ['mother'] irrigation canal of Valero")
- El Camino Real de Tierra Adentro, New Mexico (part), is a part of the United States National Historic Trail system, that was a 1,600-mile (2560-kilometer) long trade route between Mexico City and San Juan Pueblo, New Mexico, from 1598 to 1882 (The Royal Road of the Interior Land)
- Havana on the Hudson, nickname derived from the capital of Cuba, Havana, and the geographic proximity to the Hudson River to describe the northern part of Hudson County, New Jersey.
- Los Serranos, Chino Hills, California, a subdivision neighborhood within the city of Chino Hills in San Bernardino County, California
- Ranchito Feliz, Utah, a popular recreational area, campsite and RV park located near Bryce Canyon National Park and Grand Staircase-Escalante National Monument
- Rincon (surfspot), a surf spot located at the Ventura and Santa Barbara County line in Southern California (angle or corner)
- Río Buenaventura Canal, a major inundation canal near Salt Lake City, Utah. The canal is primarily responsible for maintaining consistent water levels in the Great Salt Lake.
- Tabasco, New York, a hamlet in Ulster County, New York
- Valverde, New Mexico, the site of the Battle of Valverde during the American Civil War

== See also ==
- List of English words of Spanish origin
- List of state and territory name etymologies of the United States
- Lists of U.S. county name etymologies
- List of place names of French origin in the United States
- List of place names of German origin in the United States
- List of place names of Native American origin in the United States
- List of U.S. places named after non-U.S. places
- List of Spanish place names in Canada
