= Yucatán (disambiguation) =

Yucatán is a Mexican state.

Yucatán also commonly refers to

- Yucatán Peninsula, an area divided between Mexico, Belize and Guatemala

Yucatán or Yucatan may also refer to:

== Places ==
=== Mexico ===
- Republic of Yucatán, an independent country that existed briefly in the 1840s

=== United States ===
- Yucatan, Minnesota
- Yucatan Township, Houston County, Minnesota
- Yucatan, Missouri

== Other uses ==
- Yucatán (film), a 2018 Spanish comedy film
- Yucatan crater, an impact crater in Mexico
- Yucatán, a Chilean secret police code name for a building in Santiago used by Dirección de Inteligencia Nacional
- Yucatan, an indie band from Bethesda, Gwynedd

== See also ==
- Venados de Yucatán, a soccer team
- Yucatán Channel, a strait between Mexico and Cuba connecting the Caribbean Sea with the Gulf of Mexico
- Yucatan Block, a crustal block in the North American Plate
- Yucatan Landing, Louisiana
