= Añal, New Mexico =

New Mexico ghost town

Coordinates: 34.5743153°N 104.248106°W

Añal is a ghost town in De Baca County, in the U.S. state of New Mexico. Añal was located between Alamo and Fort Sumner, on the Arroyo de Añil — a tributary of the Pecos River — after which it is named, but the town's precise location is unknown to the GNIS.

== Etymology ==
The etymon 'añil' refers to sunflowers in New Mexican Spanish. A post office called Anal (without the tilde) was established in 1916, and remained in operation until 1934. It was an unknown postmaster who first transcribed the name without i, according to an eye dialect.
