= San Lorenzo, New Mexico =

San Lorenzo, New Mexico can refer to:

- San Lorenzo, Grant County, New Mexico, an unincorporated community in Grant County
- San Lorenzo, Rio Arriba County, New Mexico, an unincorporated community in Rio Arriba County
- San Lorenzo, Socorro County, New Mexico, an unincorporated community in Socorro County
