= Tabasco, New York =

Hamlet in New York, United States

Coordinates: 41°50′51″N 74°18′03″W

Tabasco is a hamlet in Ulster County, New York, United States, located north of Kerhonkson, along Ulster County Road 3 (Samsonville-Kerhonkson Road).
