= Coyote, New Mexico =

Coyote, New Mexico may refer to the following places in New Mexico:

- Coyote, Rio Arriba County, New Mexico, a census-designated place
- Coyote, Lincoln County, New Mexico, an unincorporated community
