= West Alto Bonito, Texas =

- CDP
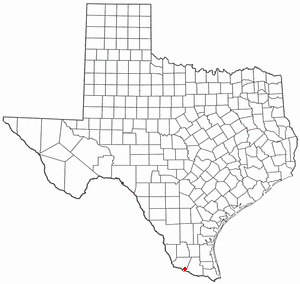
- Location of West Alto Bonito, Texas

- Coordinates: 26°18′51″N 98°39′42″W
- Country: United States
- State: Texas
- County: Starr

Area
  - Total: 0.12 sq mi (0.3 km^{2})
  - Land: 0.12 sq mi (0.3 km^{2})
  - Water: 0 sq mi (0.0 km^{2})
- Elevation: 236 ft (72 m)

Population (2020)
  - Total: 615
  - Density: 5,300/sq mi (2,000/km^{2})
- Time zone: UTC-6 (Central (CST))
  - Summer (DST): UTC-5 (CDT)
- Zip Code: 78582
- FIPS code: 48-02192
- GNIS feature ID: 1377930

West Alto Bonito is a census-designated place (CDP) in Starr County, Texas, United States. The population was 615 in 2020 census. Prior to the 2010 census, West Alto Bonito CDP was known as Alto Bonito CDP.

== Geography ==
West Alto Bonito is located at 26°18′51″N 98°39′42″W (26.314299, -98.661723).

According to the United States Census Bureau, the CDP has a total area of 0.1 square mile (0.3 km^{2}), all land.

== Demographics ==
Historical population
Census	Pop.	Note	%±
2000	569		—
2010	696		22.3%
2020	615		−11.6%
U.S. Decennial Census; 1850–1900 1910; 1920 1930 1940; 1950 1960 1970; 1980 1990 2000; 2010 2020

West Alto Bonito first appeared as a census designated place under the name Alto Bonito in the 2000 U.S. census. The name was changed to West Alto Bonito in the 2010 U.S. census.

=== 2020 census ===
West Alto Bonito CDP, Texas – Racial and ethnic composition Note: the US Census treats Hispanic/Latino as an ethnic category. This table excludes Latinos from the racial categories and assigns them to a separate category. Hispanics/Latinos may be of any race.
Race / Ethnicity (NH = Non-Hispanic)	Pop 2000	Pop 2010	Pop 2020	% 2000	% 2010	% 2020
White alone (NH)	0	1	9	0.00%	0.14%	1.46%
Black or African American alone (NH)	0	0	0	0.00%	0.00%	0.00%
Native American or Alaska Native alone (NH)	0	0	0	0.00%	0.00%	0.00%
Asian alone (NH)	0	0	0	0.00%	0.00%	0.00%
Pacific Islander alone (NH)	15	0	0	2.64%	0.00%	0.00%
Some Other Race alone (NH)	0	0	0	0.00%	0.00%	0.00%
Mixed race or Multiracial (NH)	0	0	0	0.00%	0.00%	0.00%
Hispanic or Latino (any race)	554	695	606	97.36%	99.86%	98.54%
Total	569	696	615	100.00%	100.00%	100.00%

=== 2000 census ===
At the 2000 census there were 569 people, 128 households, and 120 families in the CDP. The population density was 4,692.8 inhabitants per square mile (1,811.9/km^{2}). There were 153 housing units at an average density of 1,261.9 per square mile (487.2/km^{2}). The racial makeup of the CDP was 95.25% White, 2.64% Pacific Islander, 2.11% from other races. Hispanic or Latino of any race were 97.36%.

Of the 128 households 73.4% had children under the age of 18 living with them, 80.5% were married couples living together, 9.4% had a female householder with no husband present, and 5.5% were non-families. 5.5% of households were one person and 2.3% were one person aged 65 or older. The average household size was 4.45 and the average family size was 4.62.

The age distribution was 44.1% under the age of 18, 13.4% from 18 to 24, 30.1% from 25 to 44, 10.0% from 45 to 64, and 2.5% 65 or older. The median age was 20 years. For every 100 females, there were 109.2 males. For every 100 females age 18 and over, there were 93.9 males.

The median household income was $17,396 and the median family income was $17,396. Males had a median income of $17,857 versus $16,250 for females. The per capita income for the CDP was $3,717. About 71.9% of families and 75.0% of the population were below the poverty line, including 79.5% of those under age 18 and none of those age 65 or over.

== Education ==
West Alto Bonito is served by the Rio Grande City Grulla Independent School District (formerly Rio Grande City Consolidated Independent School District)
