= Sangre de Cristo Ranches, Colorado =

Unincorporated community in Costilla County, CO, USA

- Unincorporated community
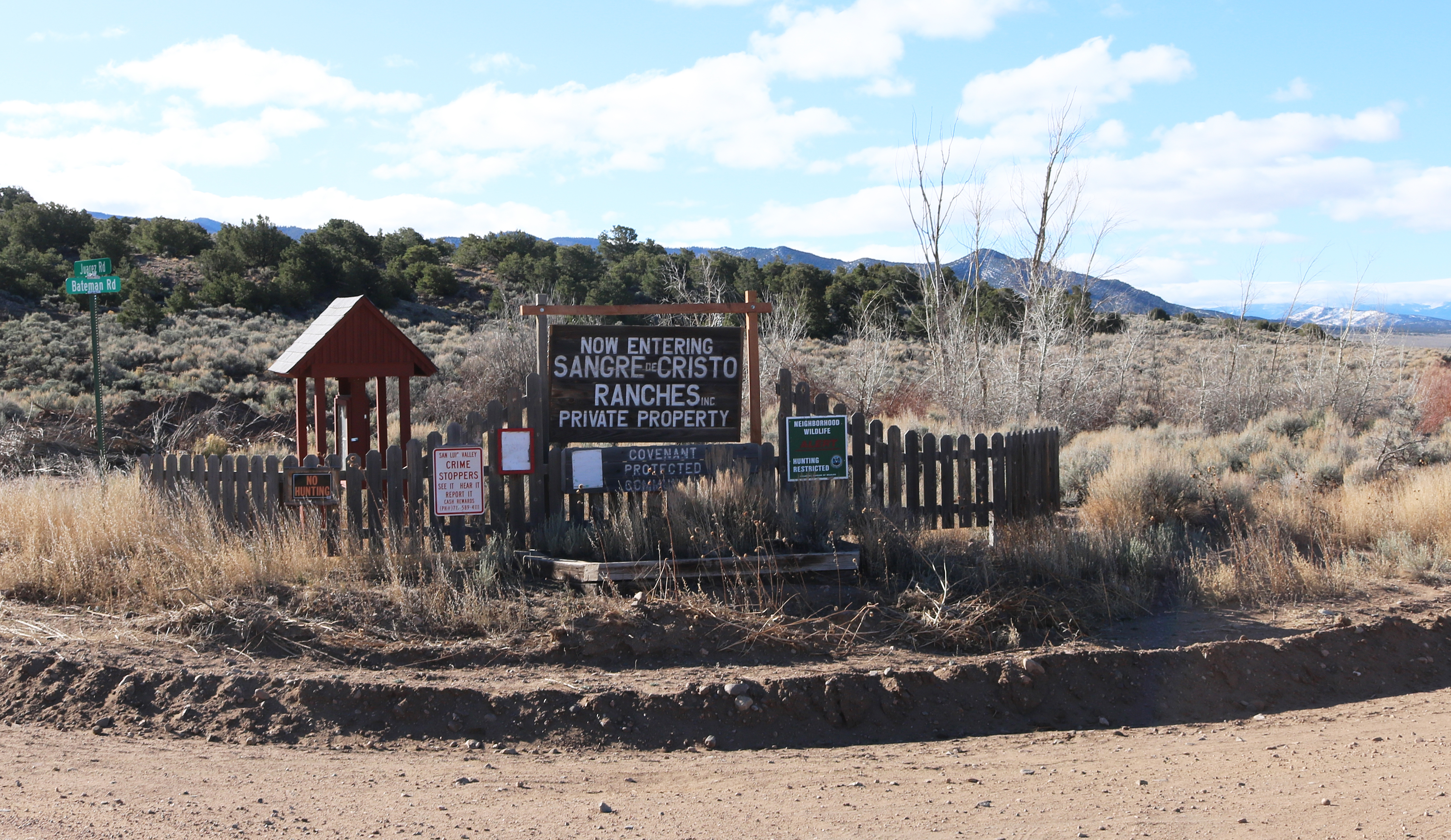
- Signs at one of the entrances.

- Location in the state of Colorado Sangre de Cristo Ranches, Colorado (the United States)
- Coordinates: 37°23′21″N 105°20′10″W
- Country: United States
- State: Colorado
- County: Costilla County
- Time zone: UTC-7 (MST)
  - Summer (DST): UTC-6 (MDT)
- ZIP code: 81133 (Fort Garland)

Sangre de Cristo Ranches is an unincorporated community located near Fort Garland in Costilla County, Colorado, United States. The U.S. Post Office at Fort Garland (ZIP Code 81133) serves Sangre de Cristo Ranches postal addresses.

== Geography ==
Sangre de Cristo Ranches is a private, rural subdivision located in the heart of the Sangre de Cristo Mountain range in Southern Colorado. It can be accessed from Route 160 at the eastern edge of the San Luis Valley, about 50 miles (80 km) west of Walsenburg, 1-mile (1.6 km) east of Fort Garland, and 30 miles (48 km) east of Alamosa. The ranches are located in Costilla County. Forbes, Inc. developed this area and began selling lots in 1971 and finished the sales operation around 2000. There are slightly under 8000 lots ranging in size from 5 to 30 acres (120,000 m^{2}). The subdivision encompasses approximately 56,160 acres (227.3 km^{2}) of land, of which 4,624 acres (18.71 km^{2}) are devoted to Common Land.

== See also ==
- List of cities and towns in Colorado
