= Boca Pointe, Florida =

- unincorporated place
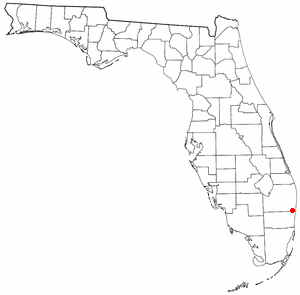
- Location of Boca Pointe, Florida
- Coordinates: 26°20′10″N 80°9′40″W
- Country: United States
- State: Florida
- County: Palm Beach

Area
  - Total: 1.2 sq mi (3.0 km^{2})
  - Land: 1.2 sq mi (3.0 km^{2})
  - Water: 0 sq mi (0.0 km^{2})
- Elevation: 13 ft (4 m)

Population (2000)
  - Total: 3,302
  - Density: 2,868/sq mi (1,107.2/km^{2})
- Time zone: UTC-5 (Eastern (EST))
  - Summer (DST): UTC-4 (EDT)
- Area codes: 561, 728
- FIPS code: 12-07285
- GNIS feature ID: 1867117

Boca Pointe was a former census-designated place (CDP) and current unincorporated place near Boca Raton in Palm Beach County, Florida, United States. The population was 3,302 at the 2000 census. The CDP was not included in the 2010 census. While it is not officially in the City of Boca Raton, the community is frequently classified under its umbrella term.

== Geography ==
Boca Pointe was located at 26°20′10″N 80°09′40″W.

According to the United States Census Bureau, the CDP had a total area of 3.0 km^{2} (1.2 sq mi), all land.

== Demographics ==
Historical population
Census	Pop.	Note	%±
1990	2,174		—
2000	3,302		51.9%

As of the census of 2000, there were 3,302 people, 1,824 households, and 1,136 families residing in the CDP. The population density was 1,108.6 people/km^{2} (2,871 people/mi^{2}). There were 2,089 housing units at an average density of 701.4 units/km^{2} (1,817 units/mi^{2}). The racial makeup of the CDP was 98.64% White (95.6% were Non-Hispanic White,) 0.39% African American, 0.61% Asian, 0.18% from other races, and 0.18% from two or more races. Hispanic or Latino of any race were 3.36% of the population.

In 2000, there were 1,824 households, out of which 5.1% had children under the age of 18 living with them, 58.8% were married couples living together, 2.9% had a female householder with no husband present, and 37.7% were non-families. 32.6% of all households were made up of individuals, and 19.2% had someone living alone who was 65 years of age or older. The average household size was 1.81 and the average family size was 2.21.

In 2000, in the former CDP, the population was spread out, with 4.6% under the age of 18, 1.5% from 18 to 24, 9.3% from 25 to 44, 31.7% from 45 to 64, and 52.9% who were 65 years of age or older. The median age was 66 years. For every 100 females, there were 79.3 males. For every 100 females age 18 and over, there were 78.7 males.

In 2000, the median income for a household in the CDP was $90,476, and the median income for a family was $104,601. Males had a median income of $81,611 versus $37,143 for females. The per capita income for the CDP was $66,797. None of the families and 2.0% of the population were living below the poverty line, including no under eighteens and 2.2% of those over 64.

As of 2000, English as a first language accounted for 94.11% of all residents, while Spanish made up 4.87%, and French was the mother tongue for 1.00% of the population.
