= Cañoncito, New Mexico =

Cañoncito or Canoncito may refer to the following places in the U.S. state of New Mexico:

- Cañoncito, Bernalillo County, New Mexico
- Canoncito, Mora County, New Mexico
- Cañoncito, Rio Arriba County, New Mexico
- Canoncito, San Miguel County, New Mexico
- Cañoncito, Santa Fe County, New Mexico
- Cañoncito, Taos County, New Mexico
- The Tohajiilee Indian Reservation, formerly known as the Canoncito Indian Reservation
