= El Nido =

El Nido may refer to:

== Places ==
- El Nido, Merced County, California
- El Nido, Los Angeles County, California, community in Los Angeles County near Malibu
- El Nido, Torrance, California, neighborhood in Torrance, California
- El Nido, Palawan, Philippines

== Others ==
- El Nido (film), a 1979 Spanish film
- El Nido, Hamilton, a heritage-listed house in Brisbane, Queensland, Australia
- The fictional island archipelago from Chrono Cross
- The Nest (aviary), El Nido in Spanish, an aviary in Ixtapaluca, Mexico
