= Casa Piedra, Arizona =

- Populated place
- Location within the state of Arizona Casa Piedra, Arizona (the United States)
- Coordinates: 31°23′21″N 111°15′02″W
- Country: United States
- State: Arizona
- County: Santa Cruz
- Elevation: 3,480 ft (1,060 m)
- Time zone: UTC-7 (Mountain (MST))
  - Summer (DST): UTC-7 (MST)
- Area code: 520
- FIPS code: 04-10649
- GNIS feature ID: 27317

Casa Piedra is a populated place situated in Santa Cruz County, Arizona, United States.
