= Yucatan Landing, Louisiana =

- Unincorporated community
- Location within Louisiana Location within the United States
- Coordinates: 32°04′48″N 91°09′14″W
- Country: United States
- State: Louisiana
- Parish: Tensas
- Elevation: 62 ft (19 m)
- Time zone: UTC-6 (Central (CST))
  - Summer (DST): UTC-5 (CDT)
- Area code: 318
- GNIS feature ID: 543801

Yucatan Landing is an unincorporated community in Tensas Parish in northeastern Louisiana, United States. The community is located near Lake Yucatan, an oxbow lake associated with the Mississippi River, east of Newellton.

Yucatan Landing is in the area of the Yucatan Cutoff, a former Mississippi River channel. Yucatan Landing provides access to Lake Yucatan for fishing and boating, with the lake containing white perch.
