= Yucatan Township, Houston County, Minnesota =

Yucatan Township, Minnesota
- Township
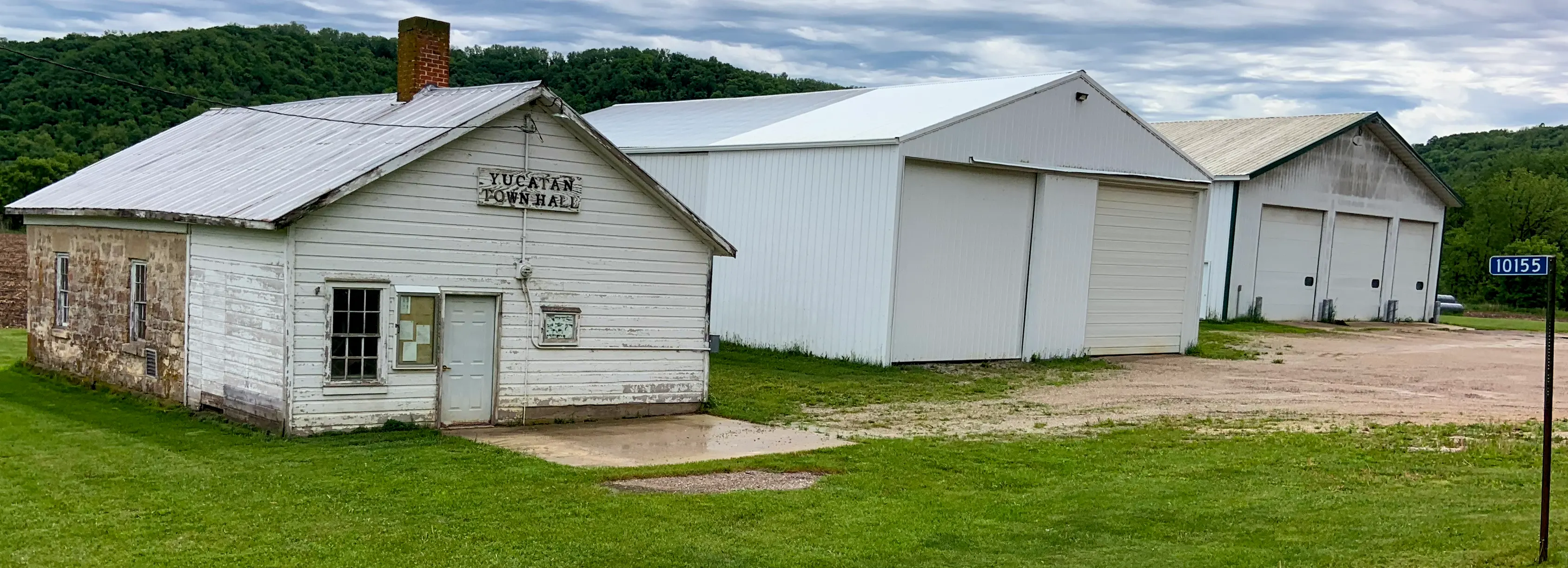
- Yucatan Town Hall

- Location within the state of Minnesota Yucatan Township, Minnesota (the United States)
- Coordinates: 43°43′1″N 91°41′12″W
- Country: United States
- State: Minnesota
- County: Houston

Area
  - Total: 42.9 sq mi (111.2 km^{2})
  - Land: 42.8 sq mi (110.8 km^{2})
  - Water: 0.15 sq mi (0.4 km^{2})
- Elevation: 1,171 ft (357 m)

Population (2000)
  - Total: 351
  - Density: 8.3/sq mi (3.2/km^{2})
- Time zone: UTC-6 (Central (CST))
  - Summer (DST): UTC-5 (CDT)
- FIPS code: 27-72166
- GNIS feature ID: 0666070

Yucatan Township is a township in Houston County, Minnesota, United States. The population was 351 at the 2000 census.

== History ==
Yucatan Township was organized in 1858, and named after the Yucatán Peninsula.

== Geography ==
According to the United States Census Bureau, the township has a total area of 42.9 square miles (111.2 km^{2}), of which 42.8 square miles (110.8 km^{2}) is land and 0.2 square mile (0.4 km^{2}) (0.35%) is water.

== Demographics ==
As of the census of 2000, there were 351 people, 133 households, and 100 families residing in the township. The population density was 8.2 people per square mile (3.2/km^{2}). There were 147 housing units at an average density of 3.4/sq mi (1.3/km^{2}). The racial makeup of the township was 97.44% White, 0.28% Native American, 0.28% Asian, 0.85% from other races, and 1.14% from two or more races. Hispanic or Latino of any race were 1.14% of the population.

There were 133 households, out of which 36.1% had children under the age of 18 living with them, 66.9% were married couples living together, 5.3% had a female householder with no husband present, and 24.1% were non-families. 17.3% of all households were made up of individuals, and 3.8% had someone living alone who was 65 years of age or older. The average household size was 2.64 and the average family size was 3.03.

In the township the population was spread out, with 27.1% under the age of 18, 5.7% from 18 to 24, 30.2% from 25 to 44, 27.4% from 45 to 64, and 9.7% who were 65 years of age or older. The median age was 40 years. For every 100 females, there were 108.9 males. For every 100 females age 18 and over, there were 111.6 males.

The median income for a household in the township was $40,417, and the median income for a family was $50,625. Males had a median income of $32,500 versus $23,125 for females.The per capita income for the township was $18,130. About 1.2% of families and 7.3% of the population were below the poverty line, including 13.0% of those under age 18 and none of those age 65 or over.
