= Española Valley =

Española Valley may refer to:

- Española Valley High School, Española, New Mexico, United States
- Española, New Mexico, a city in Rio Arriba County, New Mexico, United States
