= T. Glenn Ellington =

American judge and lawyer

Judge of the First Judicial District Court of New Mexico
- Incumbent
- Assumed office 2010

Judge of the New Mexico Court of Appeals
- In office 2000–2001
- Succeeded by: Ira Robinson

Judge of the First Judicial District Court of New Mexico
- In office 1997–2000
- Appointed by: Gary E. Johnson

Personal details
- Born: 1959 or 1960 (age 66–67) Espanola, New Mexico, U.S.
- Party: Democratic (2006–present); Republican (prior to 2006)
- Education: New Mexico State University (BA); University of New Mexico (JD)

T. Glenn Ellington is an American attorney and jurist who has served in multiple roles within New Mexico's judicial and executive branches, including as a judge on the New Mexico Court of Appeals, a state district court judge, Chief Public Defender of New Mexico, and Secretary of the New Mexico Taxation and Revenue Department.

== Life and education ==
Ellington is a native of Northern New Mexico. He graduated from Española Valley High School in 1979. He earned his undergraduate degree from New Mexico State University and received his Juris Doctor from the University of New Mexico School of Law.

== Legal Career ==
After graduating from law school, Ellington entered private legal practice in New Mexico. He later transitioned into public service, building a career that spanned both the judicial and executive branches of state government.

== Judicial Service ==
=== First Judicial District Court ===
Ellington began serving as a Judge of the First Judicial District Court of New Mexico in 1997. The First Judicial District includes Santa Fe, Rio Arriba, and Los Alamos counties. As a district court judge, he presided over a broad docket including criminal, civil, domestic relations, and juvenile cases. After his service on the Court of Appeals, Ellington returned to the First Judicial District Court, where he continued serving as a state district judge for many years.

During his tenure, Judge Ellington has overseen several notable cases. He recused himself from a high-profile Santa Fe criminal case in 2015 after making a remark to a prosecutor that drew scrutiny. He also oversaw the implementation of new criminal case-management deadlines in the district, as reported in 2025. Ellington presided over State v. Gallegos, a criminal case that was later appealed to the New Mexico Court of Appeals. He handled municipal criminal matters, including City of Santa Fe v. JoeDean, which reached appellate review. In addition, he managed a complex, multi-year criminal docket in Santa Fe, including the Ricardo Martinez case in 2015–2017.

In July 2025, Ellington commented on a New Mexico Supreme Court order imposing stricter deadlines on criminal cases in the First Judicial District. The order was intended to reduce case backlogs and address delays in criminal proceedings in the Santa Fe area, which had exceeded statewide averages. Ellington stated that the new timelines were aimed at improving efficiency and ensuring cases moved more quickly through the court system.

=== New Mexico Court of Appeals ===
In 2000, Ellington was elected in a special election to the New Mexico Court of Appeals, serving for approximately one year. During his tenure, he participated in the review of trial court decisions and the issuance of appellate opinions interpreting New Mexico law.

Ellington was elected to the Court of Appeals through a partisan election, rather than through gubernatorial appointment, consistent with New Mexico's judicial selection process at the time. He was affiliated with the Republican Party during his election.

== Executive experience ==
Ellington later served as Chief Public Defender of New Mexico, overseeing the statewide public defender system and the representation of indigent defendants in criminal proceedings.

He subsequently served as Secretary of the New Mexico Taxation and Revenue Department, where he was responsible for administering state tax policy, revenue collection, and enforcement operations.
