= San Jose, New Mexico =

San Jose may refer to the following places in the U.S. state of New Mexico:

- San Jose, Rio Arriba County, New Mexico, a census-designated place
- San Jose, San Miguel County, New Mexico, a census-designated place
