= Chili, New Mexico =

Chili, New Mexico Tsee P’áa Púu (Tewa)
- Census-designated place
- Location within New Mexico
- Coordinates: 36°06′10″N 106°09′10″W
- Country: United States
- State: New Mexico
- County: Rio Arriba

Area
  - Total: 3.32 sq mi (8.59 km^{2})
  - Land: 3.28 sq mi (8.50 km^{2})
  - Water: 0.035 sq mi (0.09 km^{2})
- Elevation: 5,811 ft (1,771 m)

Population (2020)
  - Total: 541
  - Density: 164.8/sq mi (63.62/km^{2})
- Time zone: UTC-7 (Mountain (MST))
  - Summer (DST): UTC-6 (MDT)
- Area code: 505
- GNIS feature ID: 2584076

Chili is an unincorporated community and census-designated place in Rio Arriba County, New Mexico. As of the 2020 census, Chili had a population of 541. U.S. Route 84 passes through the community. The name comes from a station of the D&RG railroad that was known locally as the "Chili Line." This in turn is likely derived from the Tewa Tsiˀi, 'at the basalt place'.

== Geography ==
Chili is located at 36.1050216°N 106.1497467°W. According to the U.S. Census Bureau, the community has an area of 3.317 square miles (8.59 km^{2}); 3.283 square miles (8.50 km^{2}) of its area is land, and 0.034 square miles (0.088 km^{2}) is water.

The Rio del Oso flows by or through Chili, within its zip code 87537, where it crosses under U.S. Route 84, and forms part of the northwest boundary of this zip code region. The Rio Chama forms the northeast boundary of this zip code region. The community sits in the floodplain of the Rio Chama below the Tewa archaeological site of Te'ewi.

== Demographics ==
Historical population
Census	Pop.	Note	%±
2020	541		—
U.S. Decennial Census

== Education ==
Chili is served by Española Public Schools. The comprehensive public high school is Española Valley High School.
