= Rio del Oso =

Intermittent stream in Rio Arriba County, New Mexico

Coordinates: 36°06′42″N 106°09′00″W

The Rio del Oso (Tewa: Phéh Seḏeh P'oe) is an intermittent stream in Rio Arriba County, New Mexico, United States. It is a tributary to the Rio Chama after crossing under U.S. Route 84 near Chili, New Mexico (in zip code 87537 between Hernandez and Medanales).

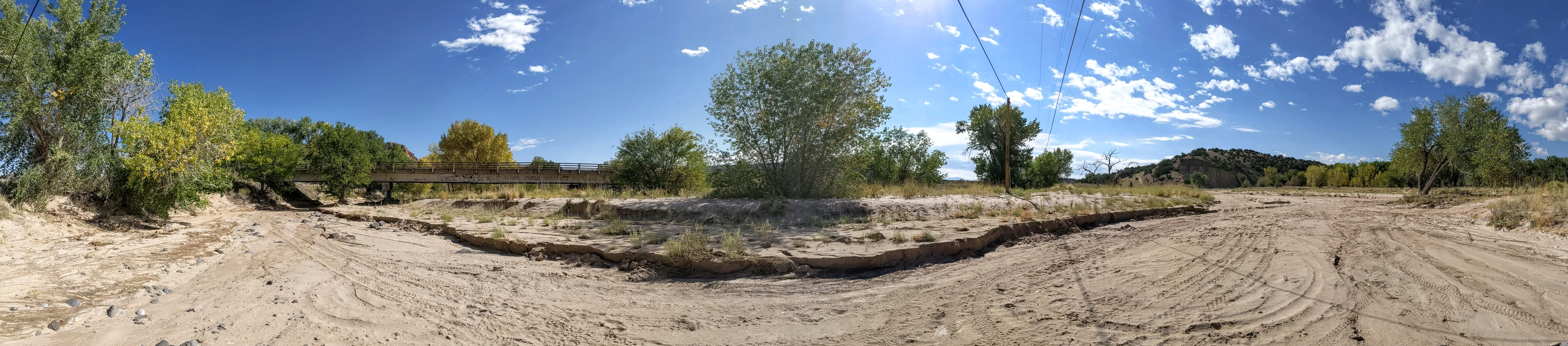
The Rio del Oso just above U.S. Route 84, during drought

The alluvial record in the lower valley of the Rio del Oso is well dated and is unusual in that it includes a single Holocene terrace, a few thousand years old.
