= La Mesilla, New Mexico =

- Census-designated place
- Location within New Mexico
- Coordinates: 35°56′47″N 106°4′8″W
- Country: United States
- State: New Mexico
- County: Río Arriba

Area
  - Total: 4.49 sq mi (11.63 km^{2})
  - Land: 4.45 sq mi (11.53 km^{2})
  - Water: 0.035 sq mi (0.09 km^{2})
- Elevation: 5,640 ft (1,719 m)

Population (2020)
  - Total: 1,844
  - Density: 414.0/sq mi (159.86/km^{2})
- Time zone: UTC-7 (Mountain (MST))
  - Summer (DST): UTC-6 (MDT)
- GNIS feature ID: 2584131

La Mesilla is a census-designated place in Río Arriba County, New Mexico, United States. As of the 2020 census, La Mesilla had a population of 1,844.

In 1870, a family from La Mesilla was ambushed and killed by Mexicans disguised as Native Americans.

== Geography ==
According to the United States Census Bureau, La Mesilla has a total area of 17.67 square kilometers, of which 17.57 km^{2} is land and (0.82%) 0.1 km^{2} is water.

== Demographics ==
Historical population
Census	Pop.	Note	%±
2020	1,844		—
U.S. Decennial Census

According to the 2010 census, 1772 people were living in La Mesilla. The population density was 151.9 inhabitants per square kilometer. Of the 1772 inhabitants, La Mesilla was composed by 68.34% White, 0.34% were African American, 1.35% were Native American, 0.4% were Asian, 0% were Pacific Islanders, the 25.62% were of other races and 3.95% from two or more races. Of the total population 73.36% were Hispanic or Latino of any race

== Education ==
It is in Española Public Schools. The comprehensive public high school is Española Valley High School.
