= Lyden, New Mexico =

- Census-designated place
- Location within New Mexico
- Coordinates: 36°09′06″N 106°00′02″W
- Country: United States
- State: New Mexico
- County: Rio Arriba

Area
  - Total: 2.24 sq mi (5.81 km^{2})
  - Land: 2.24 sq mi (5.81 km^{2})
  - Water: 0 sq mi (0.00 km^{2})
- Elevation: 6,172 ft (1,881 m)

Population (2020)
  - Total: 250
  - Density: 111.5/sq mi (43.04/km^{2})
- Time zone: UTC−07:00 (Mountain (MST))
  - Summer (DST): UTC−06:00 (MDT)
- Area code: 505
- GNIS feature ID: 2584150

Lyden is an unincorporated community and census-designated place in Rio Arriba County, New Mexico, United States. As of the 2020 census, Lyden had a population of 250. The community is located on the west bank of the Rio Grande. It was formerly known as "El Bosque." A post office operated in Lyden between 1902 and 1957.

== Geography ==
According to the U.S. Census Bureau, the community has an area of 2.242 square miles (5.81 km^{2}), all land.

== Demographics ==
Historical population
Census	Pop.	Note	%±
2020	250		—
U.S. Decennial Census

== Education ==
It is in Española Public Schools. The comprehensive public high school is Española Valley High School.
