= Canova, New Mexico =

- Census-designated place
- Location within New Mexico
- Coordinates: 36°09′53″N 105°59′08″W
- Country: United States
- State: New Mexico
- County: Rio Arriba

Area
  - Total: 0.86 sq mi (2.24 km^{2})
  - Land: 0.85 sq mi (2.19 km^{2})
  - Water: 0.019 sq mi (0.05 km^{2})
- Elevation: 5,985 ft (1,824 m)

Population (2020)
  - Total: 102
  - Density: 121/sq mi (46.6/km^{2})
- Time zone: UTC-7 (Mountain (MST))
  - Summer (DST): UTC-6 (MDT)
- Area code: 505
- GNIS feature ID: 2584066

Canova is an unincorporated community and census-designated place in Rio Arriba County, New Mexico, United States. As of the 2020 census, Canova had a population of 102. The community is located on the west bank of the Rio Grande. It is named after the extensive irrigation in the area, as it means "sluice" in Spanish.

== Geography ==
According to the U.S. Census Bureau, the community has an area of 0.864 square miles (2.24 km^{2}); 0.845 square miles (2.19 km^{2}) of its area is land, and 0.019 square miles (0.049 km^{2}) is water.

== Demographics ==
Historical population
Census	Pop.	Note	%±
2020	102		—
U.S. Decennial Census

== Education ==
It is in Española Public Schools. The comprehensive public high school is Española Valley High School.
