= Santa Cruz High School (Española, New Mexico) =

Old Santa Cruz High School

Location
- Calle hijos de la Sagrada Fami; Española, New Mexico 87532; United States; 35.9920°N 106.0496°W

Information
- School type: Public, High School
- Closed: 1976
- Enrollment: 690 (1976)
- Campus: Suburban
- Colors: Gold & Royal Blue
- Athletics conference: NMAA; AAA District 2
- Team name: Crusaders
- Rival: Española High School

The old Santa Cruz High School was located in Santa Cruz, New Mexico. The school opened in 1925 to a group of 89 students. In 1925 it was the only high school in Española until 1930 when Española High School opened. The colors for SCHS were Royal Blue and Gold and their mascot was a Crusader. The gym building was built with Works Progress Administration funds as part of a larger program of school facility construction in New Mexico.

In 1976 the school closed with an enrollment of 690 students. In 1977 a new high school was built joining both the students from Española High School and Santa Cruz, the school was named Española Valley High School and was located on El Lano Road outside of Española city limits.
