= Española Valley High School =

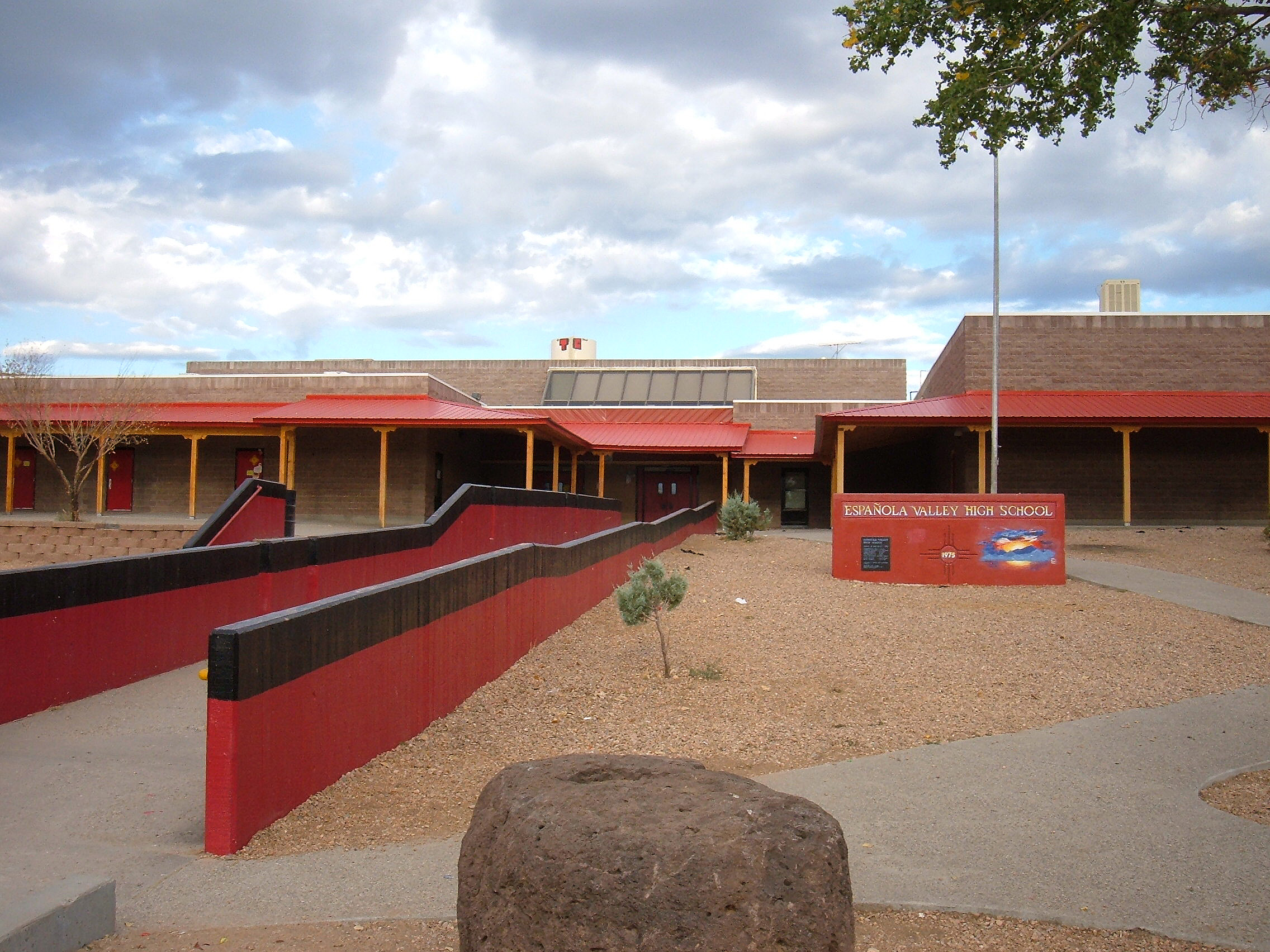
- Main entrance of EVHS

Location
- 1111 El Llano Road; Española, New Mexico 87532; United States; 36.0074°N 106.0390°W

Information
- School type: Public, high school
- Founded: 1920, 1975
- Principal: Victoria Trujillo
- Staff: 44.89 (on an FTE basis)
- Enrollment: 836 (2023–2024)
- Student to teacher ratio: 18.62
- Colors: Torch red and gold
- Mascot: Sundevil
- Newspaper: Sundevil Torch
- Yearbook: El Diablo del Sol
- Website: www.k12espanola.org/o/evhs

Española Valley High School (EVHS) is a Title-1 public senior high school of the Española Public Schools District, located in Española, New Mexico. Nearly 97% of the student body is made up of minority enrollment.

The school's athletic teams are referred to as the Sundevils, which is also the school's mascot.

== History ==
Española was founded with the arrival of the railroad in 1880, which spurred population growth in the region. Private education existed until 1905, when the demand for public schooling led to the establishment of two high schools. Santa Cruz High School, located just outside of Española, opened in 1908, while Española High School was founded in downtown Española in 1920. The schools were situated on opposite sides of the Rio Grande River.

Although the schools were operated by separate districts, administrators recognized the benefits of merging them to reduce costs and resolve a longstanding rivalry. Construction of Española Valley High School began shortly thereafter, with the new campus located on El Llano Mesa on the eastern side of Española. The school opened its doors in the fall of 1975, initially serving grades 10 through 12 with over 950 students. The first graduating class was in 1976, and Merce Villarreal served as the first principal.

During the construction of the new campus, sporting events were held at the old Española High School due to budget constraints. In 1979, the new sports complex was completed at the EVHS campus, including the large gymnasium now known as Edward Medina Gymnasium. This gymnasium remains the largest high school gymnasium in New Mexico.

== Academics ==
At Espanola Valley High School, Advanced Placement (AP) courses are offered at EVHS in almost every subject. There are over 27 elective classes offered to students including concurrent enrollment at Northern New Mexico College.

Since 2011, a student is required 24 credit hours to graduate.

=== Torch award ===
EVHS Students who have earned a 3.5 GPA yearly and involved in extracurricular activities (including athletics), are awarded the Torch Award. The award is the most honorary award of its kind at EVHS. It was created by then Principal Bruce Hopmeier in 2005.

== Student body and administration ==
Student body composition as of 2024
Race and ethnicity	Total
Hispanic	85.6%
American Indian/Alaska Native	8.6%
White	2.2%
Asian	2.0%
Two or more Races	1.2%
Black	0.3%
Native Hawaiian/Pacific Islander	0.1%
Sex	Total
Male	49%
Female	51%
Income	Total
Economically disadvantaged	76%

=== Service area ===
Espanola Valley High School is a rural high school located in Rio Arriba County. It is one of four high schools in the county and serves students from a wide range of communities. These include the city of Española and nearby areas such as Abiquiu, Alcalde, Canova, Chamita, Chili, Dixon, El Duende, Hernandez, La Mesilla, La Villita, Los Luceros, Lyden, Medanales, Ohkay Owingeh, Pueblito, San Jose, Santa Clara Pueblo, Velarde, and a part of Ojo Sarco—all situated within Rio Arriba County.

Additionally, the school serves portions of Santa Fe County, including Chimayo, La Puebla, Rio Chiquito, Santa Cruz, Sombrillo, and a portion of El Valle de Arroyo Seco. This diverse catchment area highlights the school's importance as a central educational institution for students from both counties.

=== Demographics ===
EVHS has a total minority enrollment of 97.8%, with Hispanic students comprising 85.6% of the student body—significantly higher than the state average of 63%.

=== Principals ===
List of EVHS principals
Name	Years served
Victoria Trujillo	2025–Present
Cynthia Bond	2024–2025
Kelly Miller	2023–2024
Michael Chavez	2022-2023
Jeffrey B. Sagor	2021–2022
Victoria Gonzales	2019–2021
Robert Archuleta	2016–2019
Leslie Romero Kilmer	2015–2016
Elizabeth Lucero, Ed.S	2014–2016
Hoyt Mutz	2012–2014
Theresa Flores	2011–2012
Arthur G. Salazar, Ed.S	2010–2011
W. Bruce Hopmeier, Ed.D.	2003–2010
Ralph Chacon	2002–2003
Andrew Rendon	2000–2002
Beverly Averitt	1998–2000
Ted Salazar	1995–1997
Henry Andaloza	1993–1994
George Gonzales	1990–1992
Arthur G. Salazar, Ed.S	1985–1989
Gilbert Vigil	1982–1985
Jose Benito Chavez	1978–1981
Merce Villareal	1975–1977

== Extracurricular activities ==
=== Athletics program ===
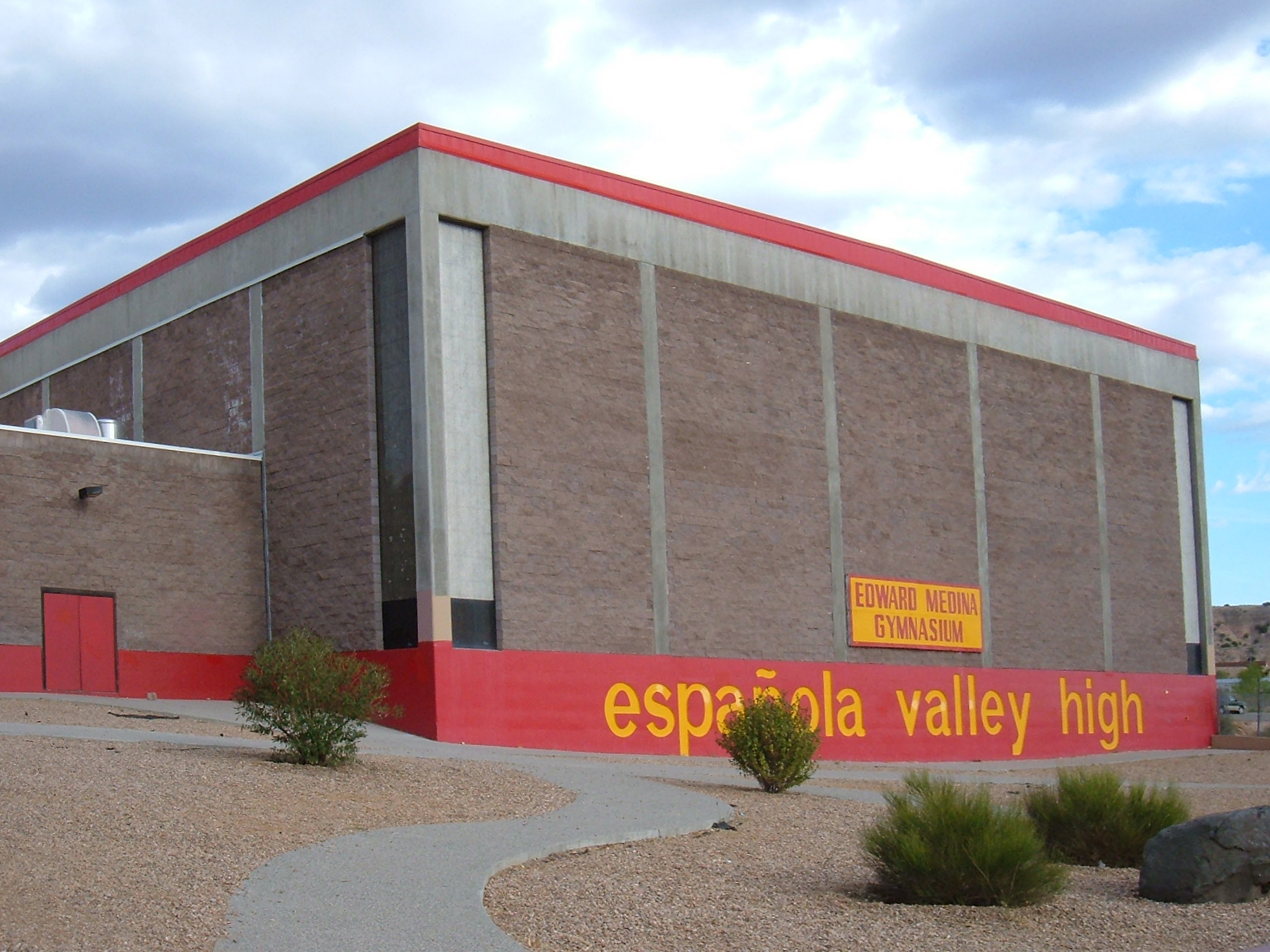
Edward Medina gymnasium; the largest high school basketball facility in the state of New Mexico.

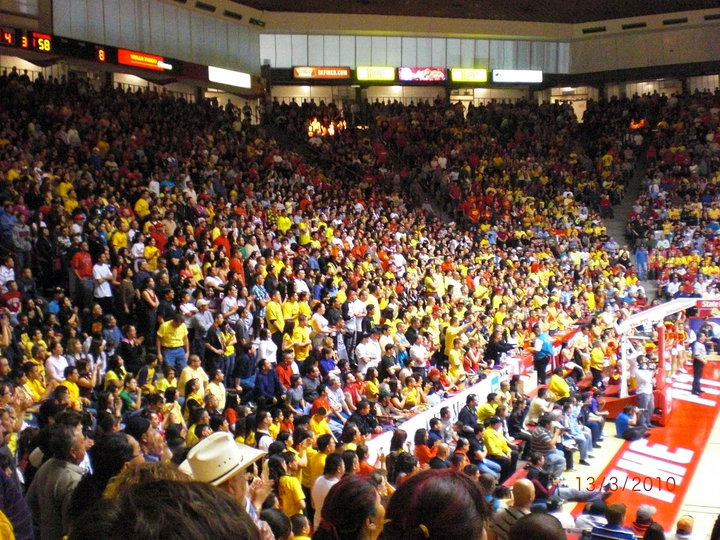
2010 State Basketball Championship game, #2 EVHS vs. #1 Roswell High School, in front of a sold-out crowd at The Pit.

Española Valley High School fields 25 athletics varsity teams, including baseball, basketball, bowling, cheerleading, cross country, football, golf, JROTC, soccer, softball, tennis, track and field, volleyball, weightlifting and wrestling teams.

EVHS competes in the New Mexico Activities Association and is classified as a 4A school in District 2, alongside Moriarty High School, Los Alamos High School, and Taos High School.

The school has won six state championships in various sports and produced 14 individual state champions. In 2007, EVHS set a New Mexico high school record with 10 graduating seniors receiving major NCAA Division I and Division II scholarships. Additionally, the school was honored with the Sportsmanship Award by the NMAA in both 1989 and 2002.

==== Boys basketball ====
Since 2008, EVHS has remained consistently competitive in AAAA basketball. The Sundevils captured the state title in the 2011 season as the #2 seed, defeating Goddard High School (55–52). and secured a second title in 2016 by defeating rival Capital High School (36–34) as the #4 seed.

EVHS has appeared in the State Final Four in the 2008, 2009, 2010, 2011, 2015, 2016, 2018 and 2025 seasons, and appeared in the Championship Game in the 2010, 2011, 2016 and 2018 seasons.

==== Rivalries ====
EVHS has maintained a rivalry with Los Alamos High School in most competitive sports. Other rivals include Capital High School and Taos High School for basketball.

==== State championships ====
NMAA State Championships
Season	Sport	Number	Champions
Fall	Cross Country, Girls	1	1992
Winter	Basketball, Boys	2	2016, 2011
Winter	Spirit/Cheer	1	1995
Winter	Bowling, Boys	1	2022
Spring	JROTC, Team	1	2023
Total		6	

=== Music program ===
==== Band ====
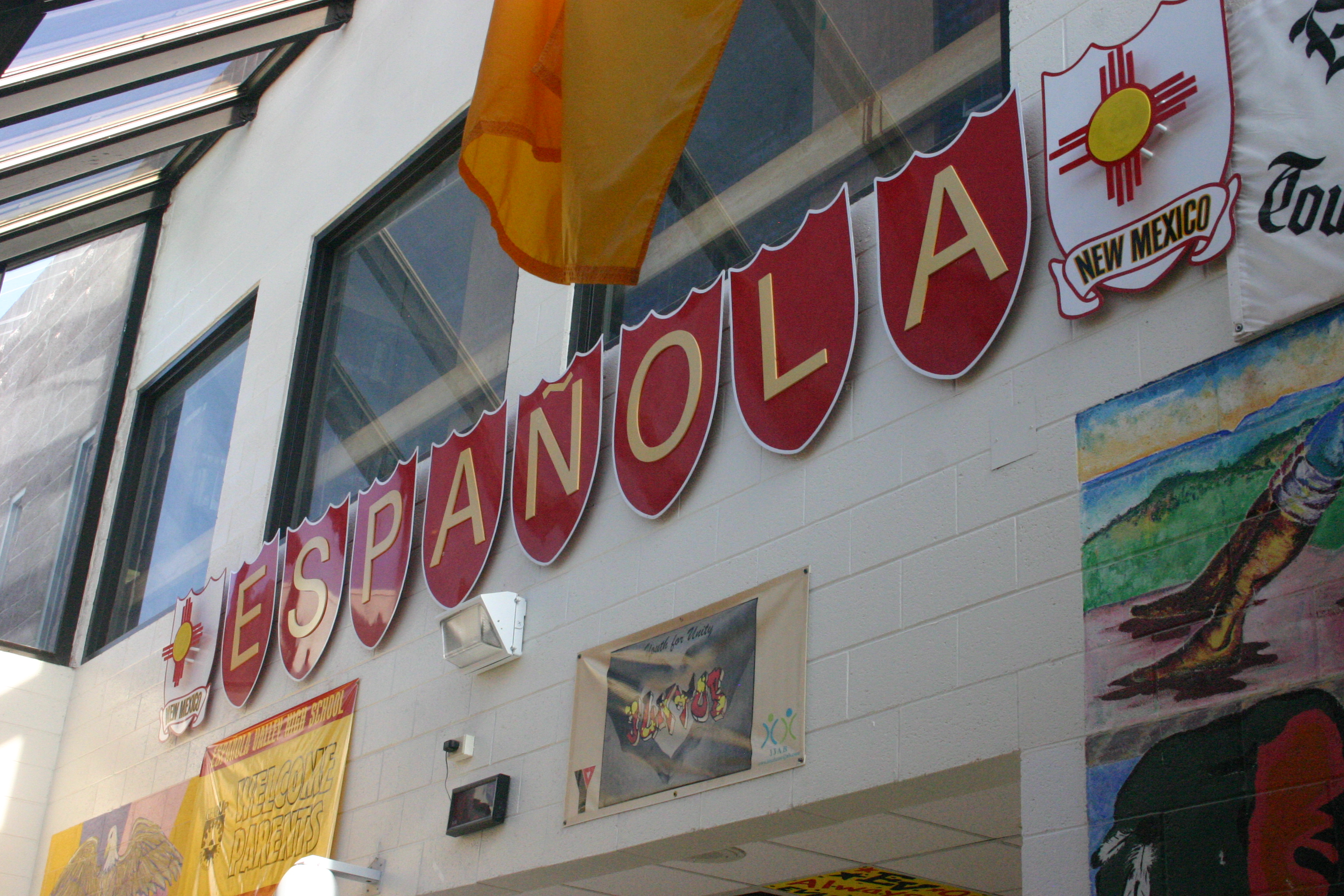
Memorabilia from the 1984 Tournament of Roses parade hang in the EVHS entry area

Española Valley High School's band, Sound of Northern New Mexico, under the direction of Robert Felix, gained national recognition. Throughout the 1980s, the band participated in numerous competitions, including several college bowl games. In 1984, the band received an invitation from the Tournament of Roses Committee to perform in the Rose Parade in Pasadena, California, marking a historic first for the event. EVHS is one of only four schools in New Mexico to have participated and marched in the Rose Parade.

==== Mariachi ====
In the late 1990s, the marching band at Española Valley High School was discontinued. In response, music teacher Alfonso Trujillo established a small mariachi band as an elective class. The group, Mariachi Sol del Valle, performed at local events for several years. In 2008, the band performed at a campaign rally for presidential candidate Barack Obama in Española. Several months later, the school's band received an invitation to participate in the 2009 presidential inaugural parade in Washington, D.C., selected from over 1,400 schools nationwide.

=== Student organizations ===
EVHS offers more than 45 clubs, organizations and extracurricular activities. Among the most notable are the Supercomputing Challenge, the Television Production program, M.E.S.A, the Sundevil Torch (the school's official student-run newspaper), El Diablo del Sol (the school yearbook), the Student School Improvement Team, and the Student Council.

==== Student Council ====
The EVHS Student Council is an active member of the New Mexico Association of Student Councils (NMASC) and participates in their annual state conferences.

In both the 2013–14 and 2015–16 school years, EVHS students were elected as State President. Additionally, an EVHS student served as State Secretary for the NMASC from 2011–12 school year. In the fall of 2011, the EVHS Student Council was selected to host the NMASC annual conference, and in 2014, it hosted the NMASC State Conference, where the school was honored with the Gold Council Award.

== Notable alumni ==
- T. Glenn Ellington, current First Judicial District Court Judge, former New Mexico Court of Appeals Judge.
- Alan Martinez, current Minority Whip of the New Mexico House of Representatives
- Joseph L. Sanchez, member of the New Mexico House of Representatives
- Debbie Rodella, former member of the New Mexico House of Representatives
- Leo Jaramillo, member of the New Mexico Senate
