= Los Luceros, New Mexico =

- Census-designated place
- Location within New Mexico
- Coordinates: 36°07′18″N 106°02′05″W
- Country: United States
- State: New Mexico
- County: Rio Arriba

Area
  - Total: 1.66 sq mi (4.31 km^{2})
  - Land: 1.64 sq mi (4.25 km^{2})
  - Water: 0.027 sq mi (0.07 km^{2})
- Elevation: 5,709 ft (1,740 m)

Population (2020)
  - Total: 891
  - Density: 543.5/sq mi (209.84/km^{2})
- Time zone: UTC-7 (Mountain (MST))
  - Summer (DST): UTC-6 (MDT)
- Area code: 505
- GNIS feature ID: 2584144

Los Luceros is an unincorporated community and census-designated place in Rio Arriba County, New Mexico, United States. As of the 2020 census, Los Luceros had a population of 891.

It includes or is close to Los Luceros Hacienda, a historic plantation with chapel that is listed on the National Register of Historic Places.

The ruins of the Tewa pueblo of Phíˀôegeh Ówîngeh Kayyee (transl. 'flicker place pueblo ruin') sit at the north end of the community.

== Geography ==
According to the U.S. Census Bureau, the community has an area of 1.661 square miles (4.30 km^{2}); 1.635 square miles (4.23 km^{2}) of its area is land, and 0.026 square miles (0.067 km^{2}) is water.

== Demographics ==
Historical population
Census	Pop.	Note	%±
2020	891		—
U.S. Decennial Census

== Education ==
It is in Española Public Schools. The comprehensive public high school is Española Valley High School.
