= Los Luceros Hacienda =

- U.S. National Register of Historic Places

- Location within New Mexico
- Nearest city: Los Luceros, New Mexico
- Coordinates: 36°07′06″N 106°02′22″W
- Area: 9.9 acres (4.0 ha)
- Built: 1350 ??
- Architectural style: Territorial Style, Greek Revival, Mission/spanish Revival
- NRHP reference No.: 83004157
- Added to NRHP: October 20, 1983

Los Luceros Hacienda, in Rio Arriba County, New Mexico near Los Luceros, New Mexico, is a historic site which was listed on the National Register of Historic Places in 1983. The hacienda property adjoins, or is close to, the Rio Grande. It is on a private road about .25 miles (0.40 km) off County Route 41 (Note: This may be, or have formerly been New Mexico State Road 389, which is mentioned in the NRHP nomination document.)

== History ==
"Los Luceros is one of the most complete 19th century haciendas in northern New Mexico. The historic ranch complex includes five contributing buildings: a large, two-storied, double-galleried house in the American plantation style, a Late Victorian cottage, a chapel, a flat-roofed building said to have been used for a time as a jail, and a guest house."

The Los Luceros Chapel was documented by the Historic American Buildings Survey (HABS) at some time after 1933. The chapel may now be known as "Capilla de Nuestra Senora de Guadalupe" (Note: What appears in Google Maps, as of July 2019.)

The buildings are built of adobe brick in what is now termed Territorial Style, a style which mixed local materials and methods with Greek Revival and/or Gothic Revival detailing.

"The buildings are constructed of adobe brick and feature the architectural styles of New Mexico's Territorial Period of the second half of the 19th century. The present form of the ranch house is of the Greek Revival Style, but its thick adobe walls apparently incorporate portions of the walls of an 18th century Spanish rancho which had been erected on the ruins of a prehistoric Indian dwelling site. Unlike the scattered grouping of architecturally attractive buildings that formed the 19th century ranch complex of Los Luceros, the original Spanish rancho was a fortress-like Indian outpost of solid adobe walls that enclosed living quarters, storerooms and stables in one structure. Only a chapel, which preceded the present one, was a separate building. Located in the lush floodplain of cottonwood forests bordering the Rio Grande, the rancho cultivated a large apple orchard, as does Los Luceros today. The ranch house, "jail" and guest house received some remodeling in the 1920s in the Spanish/Colonial-Pueblo Revival Style."

Some aspect of the site dates to c.1350 apparently.

It was deemed significant:

The historic hacienda complex of Los Luceros is one of the best preserved examples of the architecture of New Mexico's Territorial Period of the second half of the 19th century. The ranch house, a two-story adobe structure, is one of two surviving New Mexico examples of the Greek Revival Style American plantation-type house surrounded by a two-level gallery. The adobe out-buildings, which consist of a fine example of a small rural chapel, a Late Victorian cottage, a small flatroofed "jail" building typical of New Mexico's indigenous architecture, and a guesthouse complete the assemblage of Territorial Period types and styles.

The main house is believed to have served as the courthouse of Rio Arriba County.

Architecture: Greek Revival, Mission/Spanish Revival Other names: Morning Star Ranch

Historic subfunction: Religious Structure; Single Dwelling; Camp; Secondary Structure

Criteria: event, event, architecture/engineering, information potential

1350 start date?

== Gallery ==
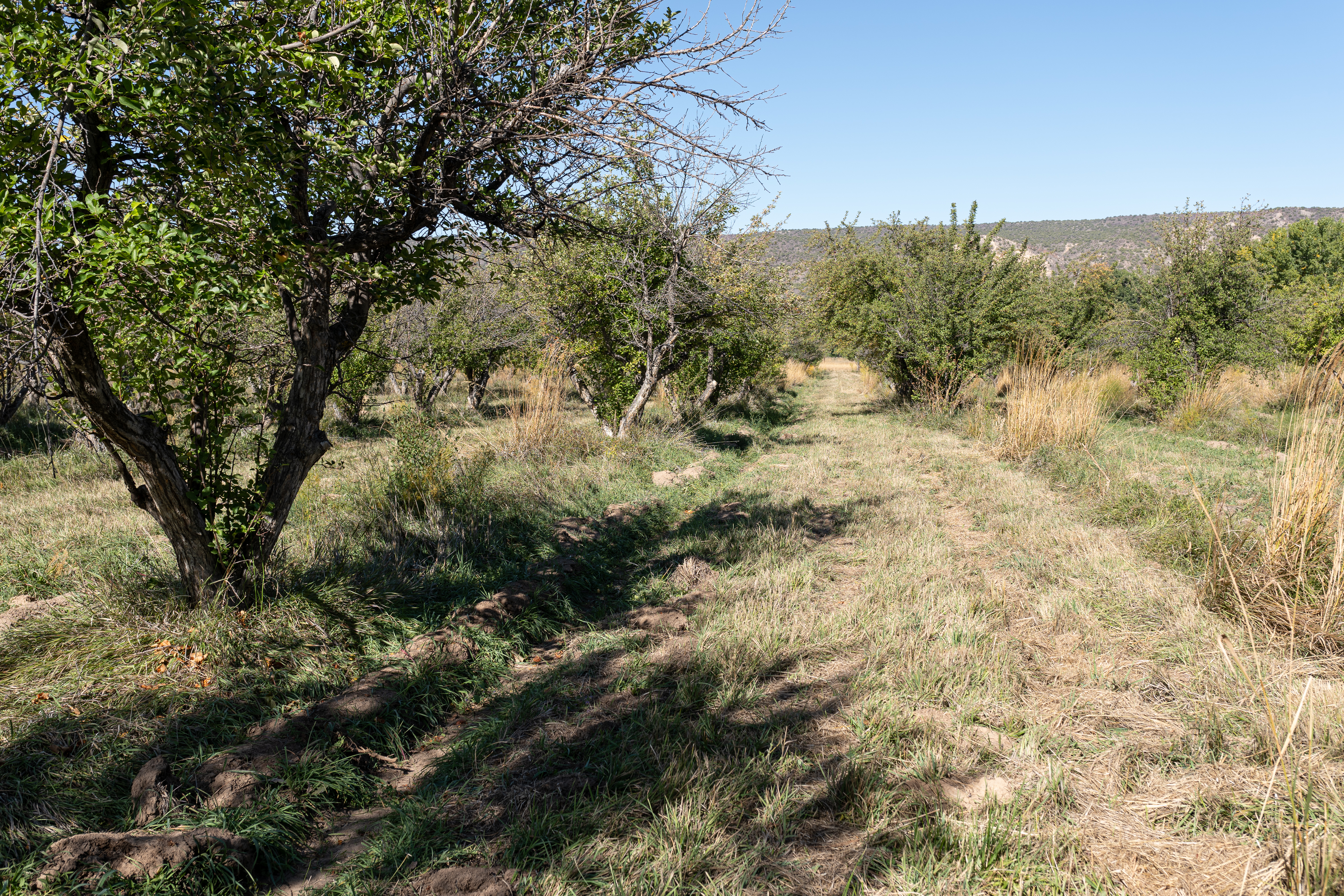
The apple orchard at the historic Los Luceros property

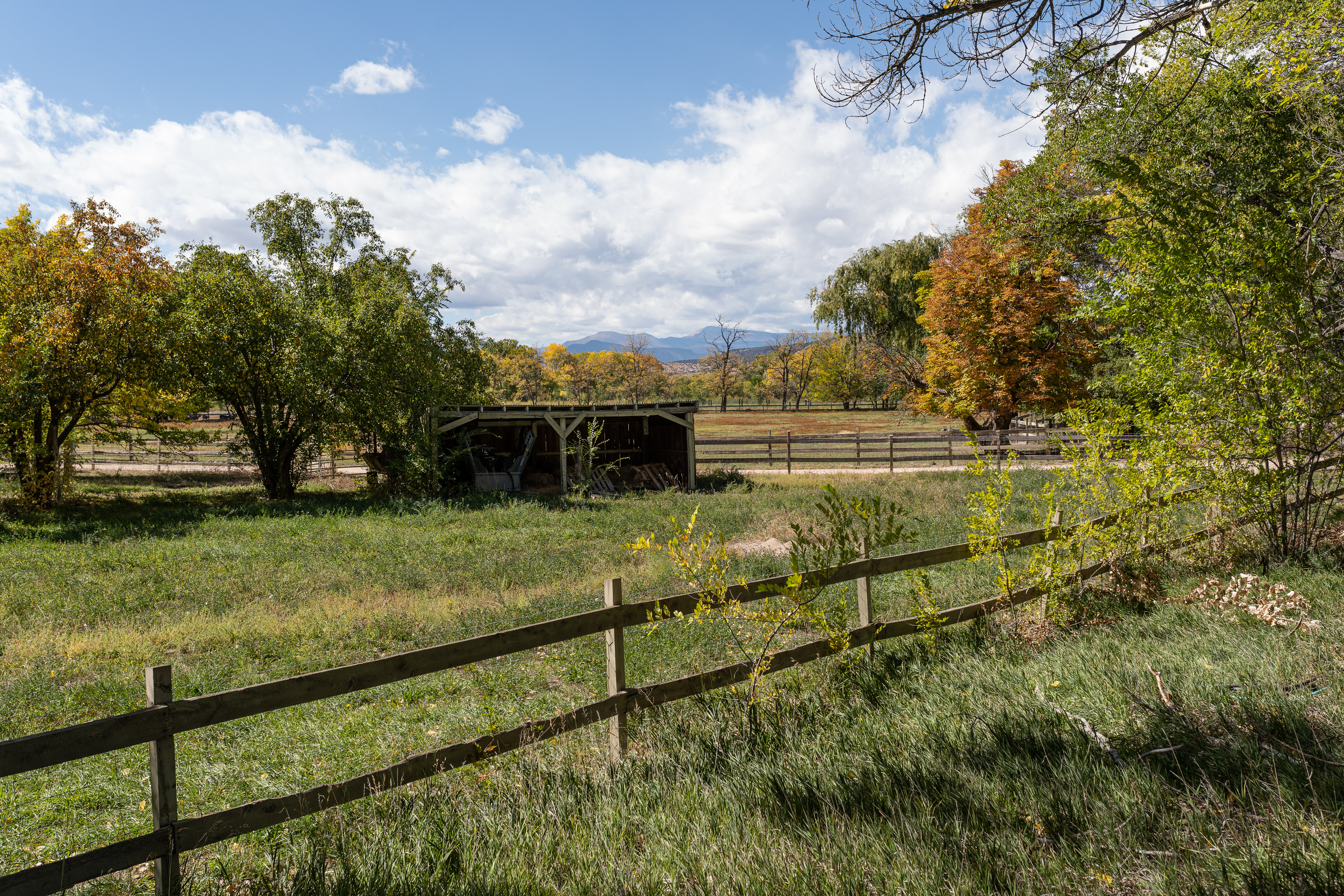
Looking out over the pasture

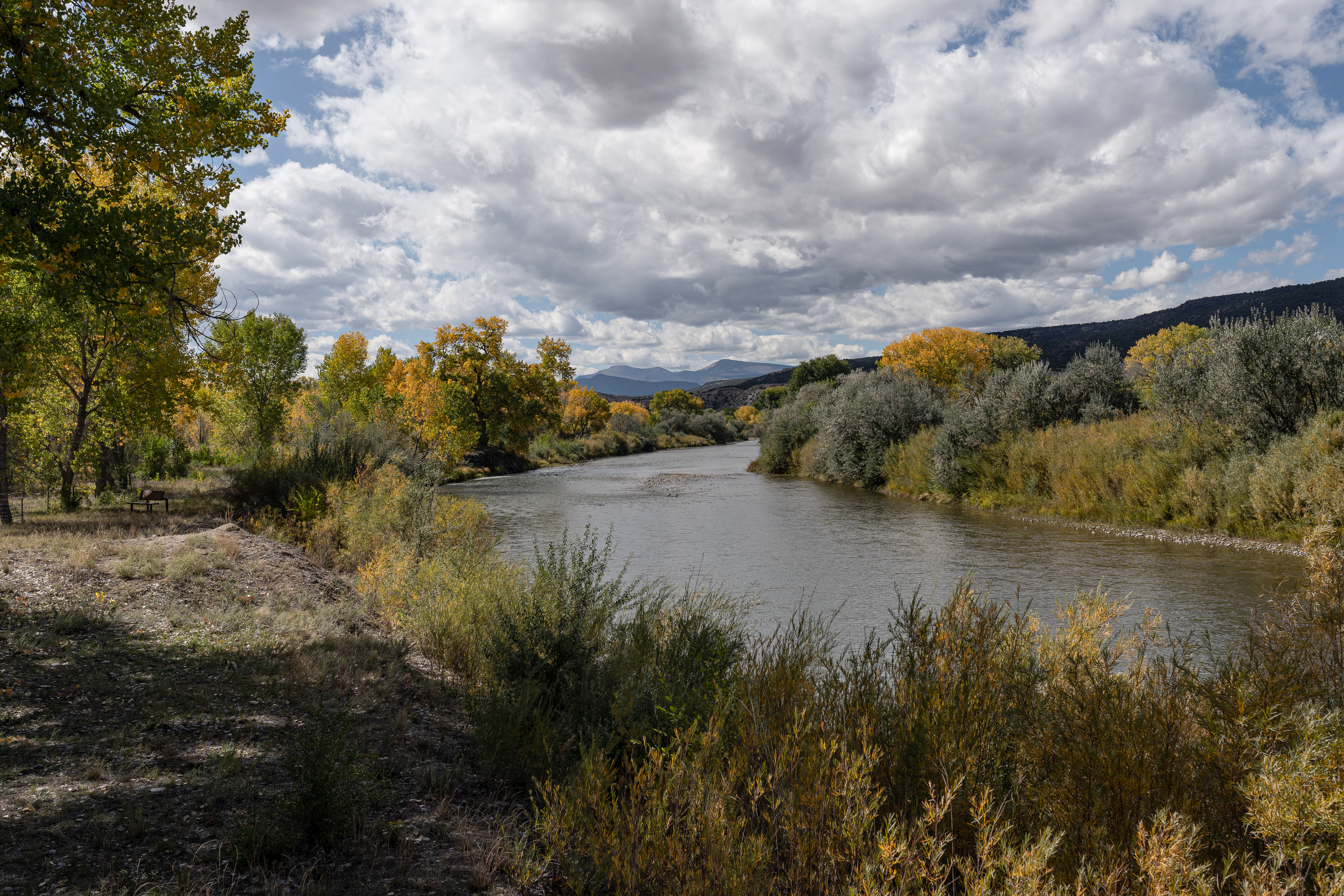
The Rio Grande bordering the western side property
