= Chamita, New Mexico =

Chamita, New Mexico Wheveh Yây Géh Núugéh (Tewa)
- Census-designated place
- Location within New Mexico
- Coordinates: 36°04′14″N 106°05′51″W
- Country: United States
- State: New Mexico
- County: Rio Arriba

Area
  - Total: 3.90 sq mi (10.11 km^{2})
  - Land: 3.85 sq mi (9.97 km^{2})
  - Water: 0.054 sq mi (0.14 km^{2})
- Elevation: 5,725 ft (1,745 m)

Population (2020)
  - Total: 1,005
  - Density: 261.0/sq mi (100.77/km^{2})
- Time zone: UTC-7 (Mountain (MST))
  - Summer (DST): UTC-6 (MDT)
- Area code: 505
- GNIS feature ID: 2584073

Chamita (Tewa: Wheveh Yây Géh Núugéh) is a census-designated place in Rio Arriba County, New Mexico, United States. As of the 2020 census, Chamita had a population of 1,005. New Mexico State Road 74 passes through the community. During its earlier years, the community was known as San Pedro De Chamita and served as the first county seat for Rio Arriba county.

== Geography ==
According to the U.S. Census Bureau, the community has an area of 3.902 square miles (10.11 km^{2}); 3.851 square miles (9.97 km^{2}) of its area is land, and 0.051 square miles (0.13 km^{2}) is water. Both the Rio Grande and the Rio Chama flow through the community. The two rivers converge south of the area.

== Demographics ==
The population of Chamita is predominantly Hispano.

Historical population
Census	Pop.	Note	%±
2020	1,005		—
U.S. Decennial Census

== Education ==
It is in Española Public Schools. The comprehensive public high school is Española Valley High School.

== See also ==
- List of census-designated places in New Mexico
