= El Duende, New Mexico =

- Census-designated place
- Location within New Mexico
- Coordinates: 36°04′27″N 106°07′22″W
- Country: United States
- State: New Mexico
- County: Rio Arriba

Area
  - Total: 1.48 sq mi (3.84 km^{2})
  - Land: 1.47 sq mi (3.80 km^{2})
  - Water: 0.015 sq mi (0.04 km^{2})
- Elevation: 5,775 ft (1,760 m)

Population (2020)
  - Total: 573
  - Density: 390.2/sq mi (150.64/km^{2})
- Time zone: UTC-7 (Mountain (MST))
  - Summer (DST): UTC-6 (MDT)
- Area code: 505
- GNIS feature ID: 2584093

San Francisco el Duende, more commonly known as El Duende ("the dwarf" in Spanish, of unknown application) is an unincorporated community and census-designated place in Rio Arriba County, New Mexico, United States. As of the 2020 census, El Duende had a population of 573. The community is located at the junction of U.S. Routes 84/285 and New Mexico State Road 74.

== Geography ==
According to the U.S. Census Bureau, the community has an area of 1.483 square miles (3.84 km^{2}); 1.469 square miles (3.80 km^{2}) of its area is land, and 0.014 square miles (0.036 km^{2}) is water.

== Demographics ==
Historical population
Census	Pop.	Note	%±
2020	573		—
U.S. Decennial Census

== Education ==
It is in Española Public Schools. The comprehensive public high school is Española Valley High School.
