= La Villita, New Mexico =

- Census-designated place
- Location within New Mexico
- Coordinates: 36°06′01″N 106°03′05″W
- Country: United States
- State: New Mexico
- County: Rio Arriba

Area
  - Total: 1.38 sq mi (3.57 km^{2})
  - Land: 1.36 sq mi (3.52 km^{2})
  - Water: 0.023 sq mi (0.06 km^{2})
- Elevation: 5,686 ft (1,733 m)

Population (2020)
  - Total: 999
  - Density: 736.0/sq mi (284.17/km^{2})
- Time zone: UTC-7 (Mountain (MST))
  - Summer (DST): UTC-6 (MDT)
- Area code: 505
- GNIS feature ID: 2584138

La Villita is an unincorporated community and census-designated place in Rio Arriba County, New Mexico, United States. As of the 2020 census, La Villita had a population of 999.

== Geography ==
La Villita is located at 36.1033559°N 106.0480783°W. According to the U.S. Census Bureau, the community has an area of 1.383 square miles (3.58 km^{2}); 1.362 square miles (3.53 km^{2}) of its area is land, and 0.021 square miles (0.054 km^{2}) is water.

== Demographics ==
Historical population
Census	Pop.	Note	%±
2020	999		—
U.S. Decennial Census

== Education ==
It is in Española Public Schools. The comprehensive public high school is Española Valley High School.
