= Rio Chiquito, New Mexico =

- CDP
- Location of Rio Chiquito, New Mexico

- Location in the United States
- Coordinates: 35°59′57″N 105°54′25″W
- Country: United States
- State: New Mexico
- County: Santa Fe

Area
  - Total: 1.07 sq mi (2.78 km^{2})
  - Land: 1.07 sq mi (2.78 km^{2})
  - Water: 0 sq mi (0.00 km^{2})
- Elevation: 6,736 ft (2,053 m)

Population (2020)
  - Total: 200
  - Density: 186.0/sq mi (71.82/km^{2})
- Time zone: UTC-7 (Mountain (MST))
  - Summer (DST): UTC-6 (MDT)
- Area code: 505
- FIPS code: 35-63110
- GNIS feature ID: 2409170

Rio Chiquito is a census-designated place in Santa Fe County, New Mexico, United States. It is part of the Santa Fe, New Mexico Metropolitan Statistical Area. As of the 2020 census, Rio Chiquito had a population of 200.

== Geography ==
According to the United States Census Bureau, the CDP has a total area of 1.5 square miles (3.9 km^{2}), all land.

== Demographics ==
Historical population
Census	Pop.	Note	%±
2020	200		—
U.S. Decennial Census

As of the census of 2000, there were 103 people, 32 households, and 30 families residing in the CDP. The population density was 67.1 inhabitants per square mile (25.9/km^{2}). There were 37 housing units at an average density of 24.1 per square mile (9.3/km^{2}). The racial makeup of the CDP was 37.86% White, 62.14% from other races. Hispanic or Latino of any race were 90.29% of the population.

There were 32 households, out of which 56.3% had children under the age of 18 living with them, 75.0% were married couples living together, 12.5% had a female householder with no husband present, and 6.3% were non-families. 6.3% of all households were made up of individuals, and 3.1% had someone living alone who was 65 years of age or older. The average household size was 3.22 and the average family size was 3.23.

In the CDP, the population was spread out, with 34.0% under the age of 18, 7.8% from 18 to 24, 28.2% from 25 to 44, 20.4% from 45 to 64, and 9.7% who were 65 years of age or older. The median age was 37 years. For every 100 females, there were 119.1 males. For every 100 females age 18 and over, there were 94.3 males.

The median income for a household in the CDP was $44,135, and the median income for a family was $44,135. Males had a median income of $46,250 versus $50,156 for females. The per capita income for the CDP was $13,983. None of the population and none of the families were below the poverty line.

== Education ==
The community is in Española Public Schools. The comprehensive public high school is Española Valley High School.
