= La Puebla, New Mexico =

- CDP
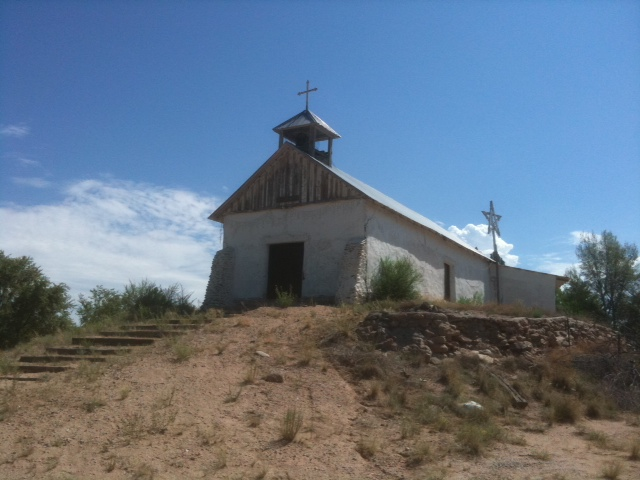
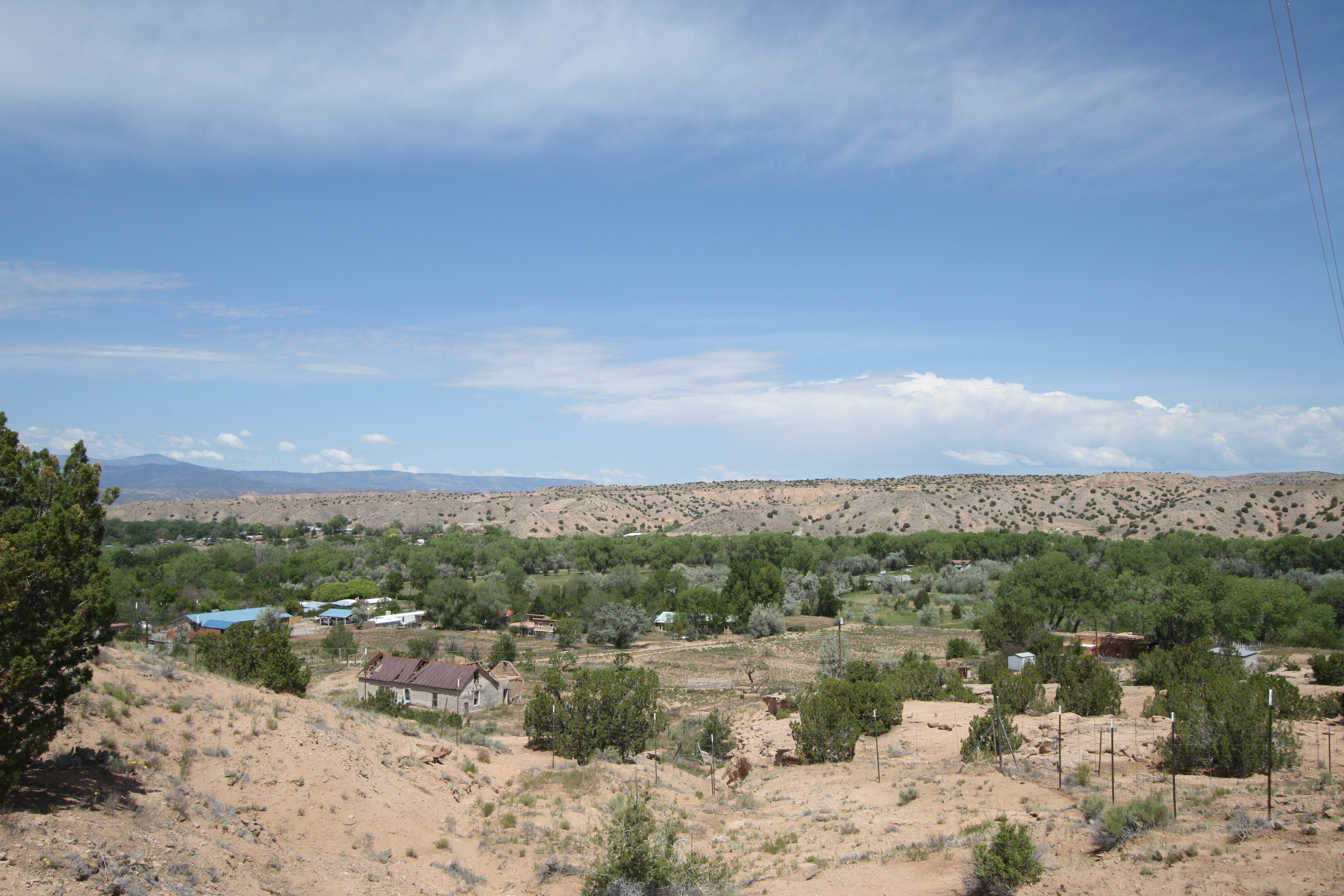
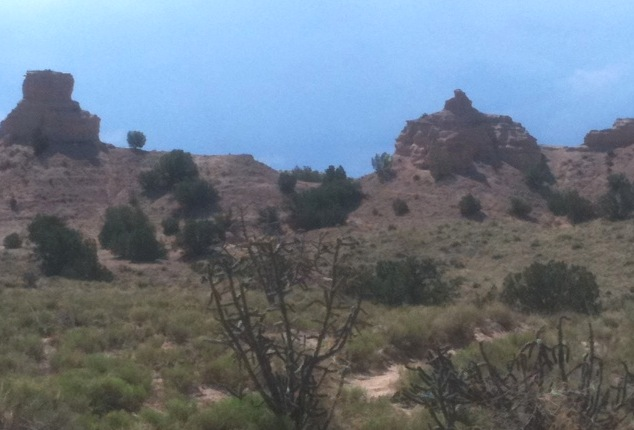
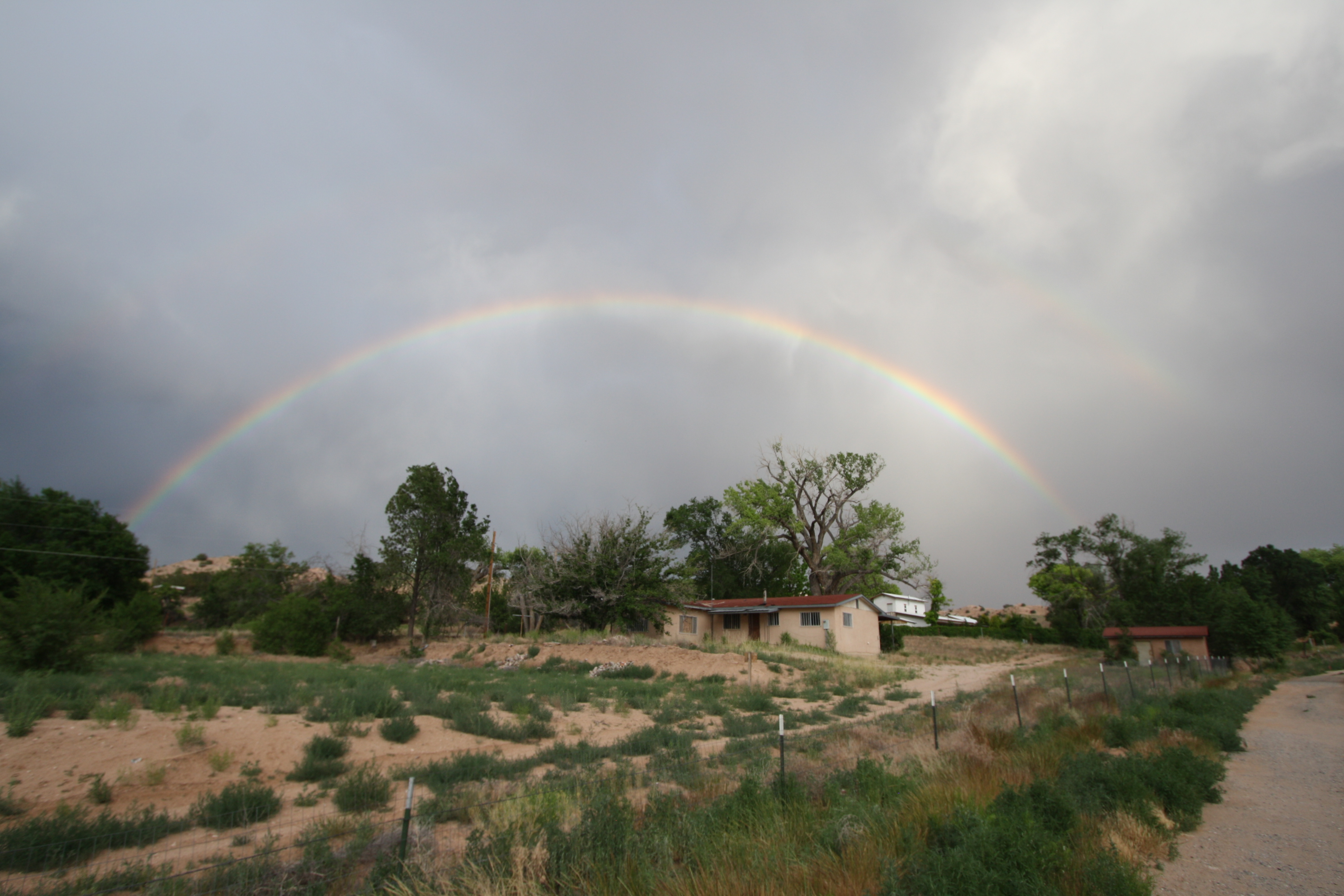
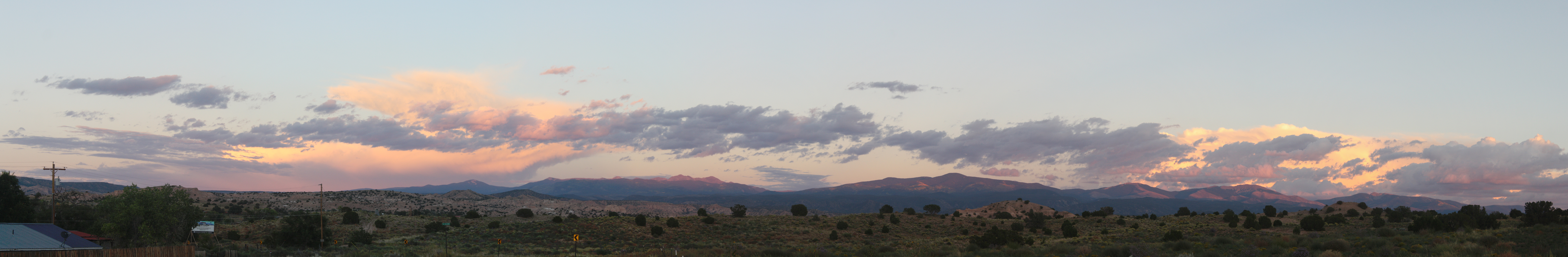
- Penitnente La Puebla church La Puebla Valley from Park La Puebla badlands Sunrise in La Puebla

- Location of La Puebla, New Mexico

- Location in the United States
- Coordinates: 35°59′52″N 106°00′02″W
- Country: United States
- State: New Mexico
- County: Santa Fe

Area
  - Total: 2.84 sq mi (7.35 km^{2})
  - Land: 2.84 sq mi (7.35 km^{2})
  - Water: 0 sq mi (0.00 km^{2})
- Elevation: 5,863 ft (1,787 m)

Population (2020)
  - Total: 1,123
  - Density: 395.8/sq mi (152.82/km^{2})
- Time zone: UTC-7 (Mountain (MST))
  - Summer (DST): UTC-6 (MDT)
- Area code: 505
- FIPS code: 35-39170
- GNIS feature ID: 2408513

La Puebla is a census-designated place (CDP) in Santa Fe County, New Mexico, United States. It is part of the Santa Fe, New Mexico Metropolitan Statistical Area. As of the 2020 census, La Puebla had a population of 1,123.

The community sits on the site of Ts’ą̈waḏi Ówîngeh Kayyee ('wide white gap pueblo ruin', also known as Tsawari or Yam P’hamba), a pueblo of Tewa as well as Tano, who settled the area after the Pueblo Revolt before migrating to live with the Hopi at Hano, Arizona.

== Geography ==
According to the United States Census Bureau, the CDP has a total area of 2.4 square miles (6.2 km^{2}), all land.

== Demographics ==
Historical population
Census	Pop.	Note	%±
2020	1,123		—
U.S. Decennial Census

As of the census of 2000, there were 1,296 people, 492 households, and 340 families residing in the CDP. The population density was 542.0 inhabitants per square mile (209.3/km^{2}). There were 524 housing units at an average density of 219.1 per square mile (84.6/km^{2}). The racial makeup of the CDP was 56.64% White, 0.39% African American, 2.55% Native American, 0.46% Asian, 0.08% Pacific Islander, 34.57% from other races, and 5.32% from two or more races. Hispanic or Latino of any race were 79.94% of the population.

There were 492 households, out of which 40.9% had children under the age of 18 living with them, 49.4% were married couples living together, 14.0% had a female householder with no husband present, and 30.7% were non-families. 22.2% of all households were made up of individuals, and 5.3% had someone living alone who was 65 years of age or older. The average household size was 2.63 and the average family size was 3.15.

In the CDP, the population was spread out, with 29.9% under the age of 18, 8.5% from 18 to 24, 32.3% from 25 to 44, 21.4% from 45 to 64, and 8.0% who were 65 years of age or older. The median age was 34 years. For every 100 females, there were 97.0 males. For every 100 females age 18 and over, there were 98.9 males.

The median income for a household in the CDP was $29,107, and the median income for a family was $34,833. Males had a median income of $30,741 versus $26,964 for females. The per capita income for the CDP was $16,582. About 10.3% of families and 18.1% of the population were below the poverty line, including 27.0% of those under age 18 and 48.9% of those age 65 or over.

== Education ==
The community is in the Española Public Schools district. The comprehensive public high school is Española Valley High School.

== See also ==
- List of census-designated places in New Mexico
