= Moonrise, Hernandez, New Mexico =

1941 photograph by Ansel Adams

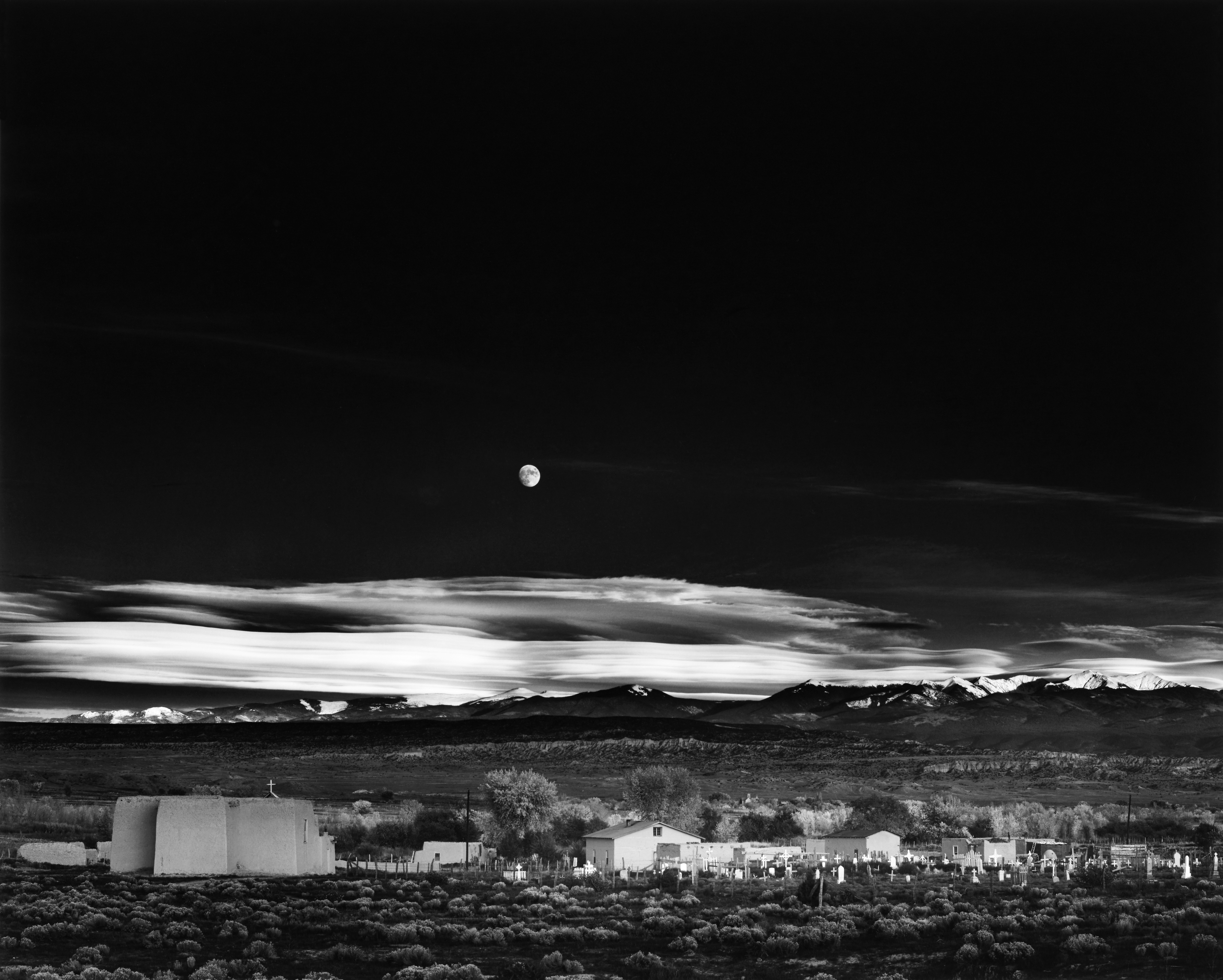
Moonrise, Hernandez, New Mexico (1941) by Ansel Adams

Moonrise, Hernandez, New Mexico is a black-and-white photograph taken by Ansel Adams, late in the afternoon on November 1, 1941, from a shoulder of highway US 84 / US 285 in the unincorporated community of Hernandez, New Mexico, United States. The photograph shows the Moon rising in a dominating black sky with low clouds above a collection of modest dwellings, a church and a cross-filled graveyard, with snow-covered mountains in the background. Adams captured a single image, with the sunset lighting the white crosses and buildings. Because Adams did not date the image, attempts have been made to determine a date from astronomical information in the photograph. It is one of Adams' most popular works.

== Creation ==
In October 1941, United States Secretary of the Interior Harold Ickes hired Adams for six months to create photographs of lands under the jurisdiction of the Department of the Interior, for use as mural-sized prints for decoration of the department's new Interior Museum. Adams was accompanied by his young son Michael and his best friend Cedric Wright on a long road trip around the west. They came upon the scene while traveling through the Chama River valley toward Española in late afternoon on November 1 (see section "Dating", below); accounts of what transpired differ considerably.

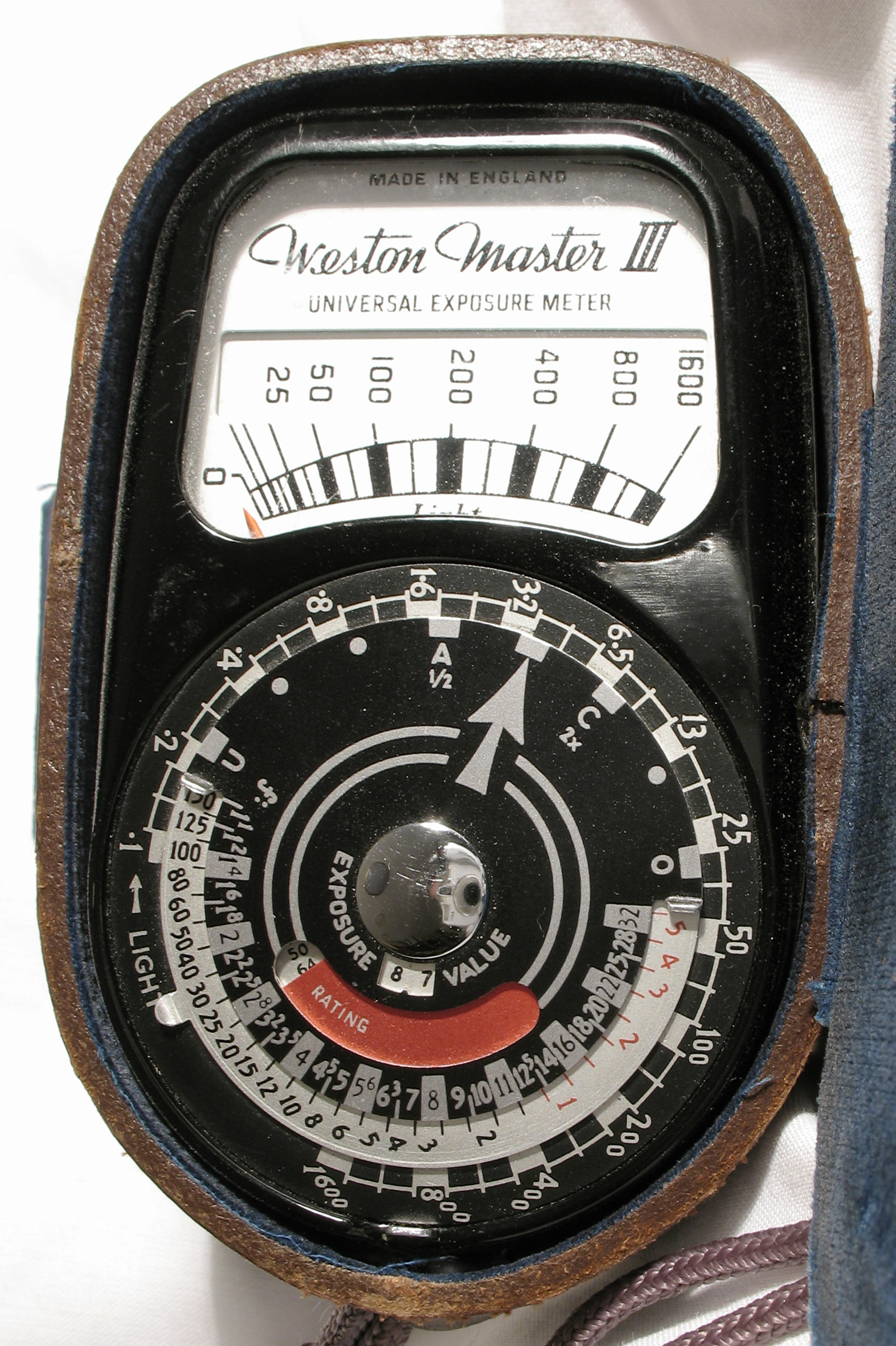
An example of a Weston exposure meter. An average light reading is obtained from the device and the arrow on the circular panel is rotated across the value, yielding a range of aperture and shutter speed combinations that would properly expose the scene. (Note: The "A" and "C" positions ("Absence of contrast" and "Contrast") can also be used for flat or high contrast scenes, halving or doubling the exposure respectively. The "U" or "O" positions ("Underexposed" and "Overexposed") represent the limits of the range of light that film could reproduce.)

The initial publication of Moonrise was at the end of 1942, with a two-page image in U.S. Camera Annual 1943, having been selected by the "photo judge" of U.S. Camera, Edward Steichen. In that publication, Adams gave this account:

It was made after sundown, there was a twilight glow on the distant peaks and clouds. The average light values of the foreground were placed on the "U" of the Weston Master meter; apparently the values of the moon and distant peaks did not lie higher than the "A" of the meter ... (Note: Adams set his exposure so that the dark foreground would not be underexposed. He also noted that relative to this exposure, the Moon and peaks were still quite dim.) Some may consider this photograph a "tour de force" but I think of it as a rather normal photograph of a typical New Mexican landscape. Twilight photography is unfortunately neglected; what may be drab and uninteresting by daylight may assume a magnificent quality in the halflight between sunset and dark.

Adams' later accounts were more dramatic. In his autobiography, completed by his assistant and editor Mary Alinder shortly after his 1984 death, the traveling companions encountered a "fantastic scene", a church and cemetery near Hernandez, New Mexico, and pulled to the side of the road. Adams recalled that he yelled at his son Michael and at Wright to "Get this! Get that, for God's sake! We don't have much time!". Desperate to capture the image in the fading light, they scrambled to set up the tripod and camera, knowing that only moments remained before the light was gone.

Adams had given a similar account in his 1983 book Examples: The Making of 40 Photographs,

I could not find my Weston exposure meter! The situation was desperate: the low sun was trailing the edge of clouds in the west, and shadow would soon dim the white crosses ... I suddenly realized that I knew the luminance of the moon — 250 c/ft^{2}. Using the Exposure Formula, I placed this value on Zone VII ... Realizing as I released the shutter that I had an unusual photograph which deserved a duplicate negative, I quickly reversed the film holder, but as I pulled the darkslide, the sunlight passed from the white crosses; I was a few seconds too late! The lone negative suddenly became precious.

== Dating the image ==
Beaumont Newhall, a photographer, curator and friend of Adams, was intrigued by the fact that Adams did not know the date of the photograph. While Adams remembered that the photograph was taken in the autumn, he had variously given the year as 1940, 1941, and 1942—while the picture was published in 1943–1944.

Newhall wondered if the astronomical information in the photograph could provide the answer, so he approached David Elmore of the High Altitude Observatory in Boulder, Colorado. Focusing on the autumn months of 1941 through 1944, Elmore found 36 plausible dates for the image. Elmore determined a probable location and direction for the camera alongside the highway. Using that location information, he then plotted the Moon's apparent position on his computer screen for those dates to find a match. Elmore concluded that Moonrise was taken on October 31, 1941, at 4:03 p.m. Adams thanked Elmore for determining the date and used that date in several subsequent publications, including his 1983 book Examples: The Making of 40 Photographs that used the date but rounded the time to 4:05 p.m.

Dennis di Cicco of Sky & Telescope magazine read about Elmore's results and tried verifying them. He entered the position, direction, and time into a program that displayed the Moon's position, but the resulting position did not match the Moonrise image. He was intrigued by the discrepancy, and after working intermittently over the next ten years, including a visit to the location, concluded in 1991 "that Adams had been at the edge of the old roadbed, about 50 feet (20 m) west of the spot on the modern highway that Elmore had identified". His calculations determined that the image was taken at 4:49:20 p.m. on November 1, 1941. He reviewed his calculations with Elmore, who agreed with Di Cicco's result. Elmore had the coordinates of Hernandez wrong, so when he computed the azimuths and altitudes of the mountain peaks, they also were wrong. In addition, his computer monitor had distorted the ratio of height to width of the tracing.

== Reception ==
Art historian H. W. Janson called the photograph "a perfect marriage of straight and pure photography".

Pre-1970 prints are very rare as the negative is hard to work with. Adams remade the negative, heightening the contrast to make high quality reprints easier to produce.

The photograph became so popular and collectible that Adams personally made over 1,300 photographic prints of it during his career.

== Art market ==
The fame of the photograph grew when a 1948 print sold at auction for $71,500 in 1971 ($568,400 in 2025 dollars); the same print sold for $609,600 in 2006 ($973,600 in 2025 dollars) at a Sotheby's auction.

A mural-sized print of the same photograph sold for $930,000 at Christie's branch in New York in October 2021.

Peter Bunnell's print of Moonrise, Hernandez, New Mexico was the highest priced photograph of the April 2023 Phillips Photography auction for an above-estimate $381,000. Bunnell was gifted the large format print directly from Adams in August 1959 after they had become friends.

== See also ==
- List of photographs considered the most important
