= Pueblito, New Mexico =

Pueblito, New Mexico Othónä Ų́wą̈́nä́ (Tewa)
- Census-designated place
- Location within New Mexico
- Coordinates: 36°04′22″N 106°04′52″W
- Country: United States
- State: New Mexico
- County: Rio Arriba

Area
  - Total: 0.61 sq mi (1.58 km^{2})
  - Land: 0.61 sq mi (1.58 km^{2})
  - Water: 0 sq mi (0.00 km^{2})
- Elevation: 5,702 ft (1,738 m)

Population (2020)
  - Total: 91
  - Density: 149/sq mi (57.7/km^{2})
- Time zone: UTC-7 (Mountain (MST))
  - Summer (DST): UTC-6 (MDT)
- Area code: 505
- GNIS feature ID: 2584185

Pueblito (Tewa: Othónä Ų́wą̈́nä́) is an unincorporated community and census-designated place in Rio Arriba County, New Mexico, United States. As of the 2020 census, Pueblito had a population of 91. Pueblito was settled in the 1850s by former residents of La Parida, which was flooded by the Rio Grande. The inhabitants are Tewa and part of Ohkay Owingeh Pueblo.

== Geography ==
According to the U.S. Census Bureau, the community has an area of 0.609 square miles (1.58 km^{2}), all land.

== Demographics ==
Historical population
Census	Pop.	Note	%±
2020	91		—
U.S. Decennial Census

== Education ==
The community is in Española Public Schools. The comprehensive public high school is Española Valley High School.
