= Ojo Sarco, New Mexico =

Ojo Sarco
- Unincorporated community
- Location within the state of New Mexico Ojo Sarco (the United States)
- Coordinates: 36°08′05″N 105°47′30″W
- Country: United States
- State: New Mexico
- County: Rio Arriba

Area
  - Total: 3.41 sq mi (8.83 km^{2})
  - Land: 3.41 sq mi (8.83 km^{2})
  - Water: 0 sq mi (0.00 km^{2})
- Elevation: 7,399 ft (2,255 m)

Population (2020)
  - Total: 277
  - Density: 81.2/sq mi (31.37/km^{2})
- Time zone: UTC-7 (Mountain (MST))
  - Summer (DST): UTC-6 (MDT)
- Area code: 505
- GNIS feature ID: 2806744

Ojo Sarco is an unincorporated community located in Rio Arriba County, New Mexico, United States. As of the 2020 census, Ojo Sarco had a population of 277. Ojo Sarco is located in the Sangre de Cristo Mountains, 1 mile (1.6 km) from New Mexico State Road 76 and 1.5 miles (2.4 km) west-southwest of Las Trampas. Ojo Sarco had its own post office until June 8, 1996. Ojo Sarco was founded by settlers on the Las Trampas Land Grant which dates back to 1751.

== Demographics ==
Historical population
Census	Pop.	Note	%±
2020	277		—
U.S. Decennial Census

== Education ==
The southern portion is in Peñasco Independent Schools while the northern portion is in Española Public Schools. The comprehensive public high school for the Española district is Española Valley High School.
