= Española Public Schools =

School district in Española, New Mexico, USA

Coordinates: 35.9920°N 106.0783°W

Location
- Northern New Mexico; South Rio Arriba County and Northern Santa Fe County

District information
- Type: Public
- Motto: Reaching for Excellence, one student at a time.
- Grades: K-12
- Established: 1920
- Superintendent: Eric Spencer

Students and staff
- Students: 4,970

Other information
- Website: http://www.k12espanola.org

Española Public School District #55 (EPSD) or Española Public Schools (EPS) is a school district based in Española, New Mexico, USA. It includes sections of Rio Arriba County and Santa Fe County.

In the year 2000 the district had a total of 16 schools with approximately 6,103 students. In the 2011–2012 school year, the district had an enrollment of 4,970. Currently there are 10 elementary schools, a kindergarten center, a middle school, and a high school.

== History ==
In 2016 Bobbie Gutierrez resigned as superintendent, and at that time Eric Martinez became the superintendent.

The New Mexico Public Education Department criticized Martinez, who left in 2017 and was paid $130,000 and leave money as part of a buyout. That year the school board members changed in composition to a significant degree.

== Service area ==
In addition to Española, the district serves:

- Sections of Rio Arriba County, including: Abiquiu, Alcalde, Canova, Chamita, Chili, Dixon, El Duende, Hernandez, La Mesilla, La Villita, Los Luceros, Lyden, Medanales, Ohkay Owingeh, Pueblito, San Jose, Santa Clara Pueblo, Velarde, and a portion of Ojo Sarco
- Sections of Santa Fe County, including Chimayo, La Puebla, Rio Chiquito, Santa Cruz, Sombrillo, and a portion of El Valle de Arroyo Seco

== School Board ==
Name	Position	Took office	Up for re–election
Jeremy G. Maestas	Board President, District 4	2019	2023
Katrina J. Martinez	Vice-President, District 1	2021	2023
Brandon M. Bustos	Secretary, District 2	2019	2025
Ruben Archuleta	Member, District 5	2015	2023
Javin Coriz	Member, District 3	2021	2025

== List of schools ==
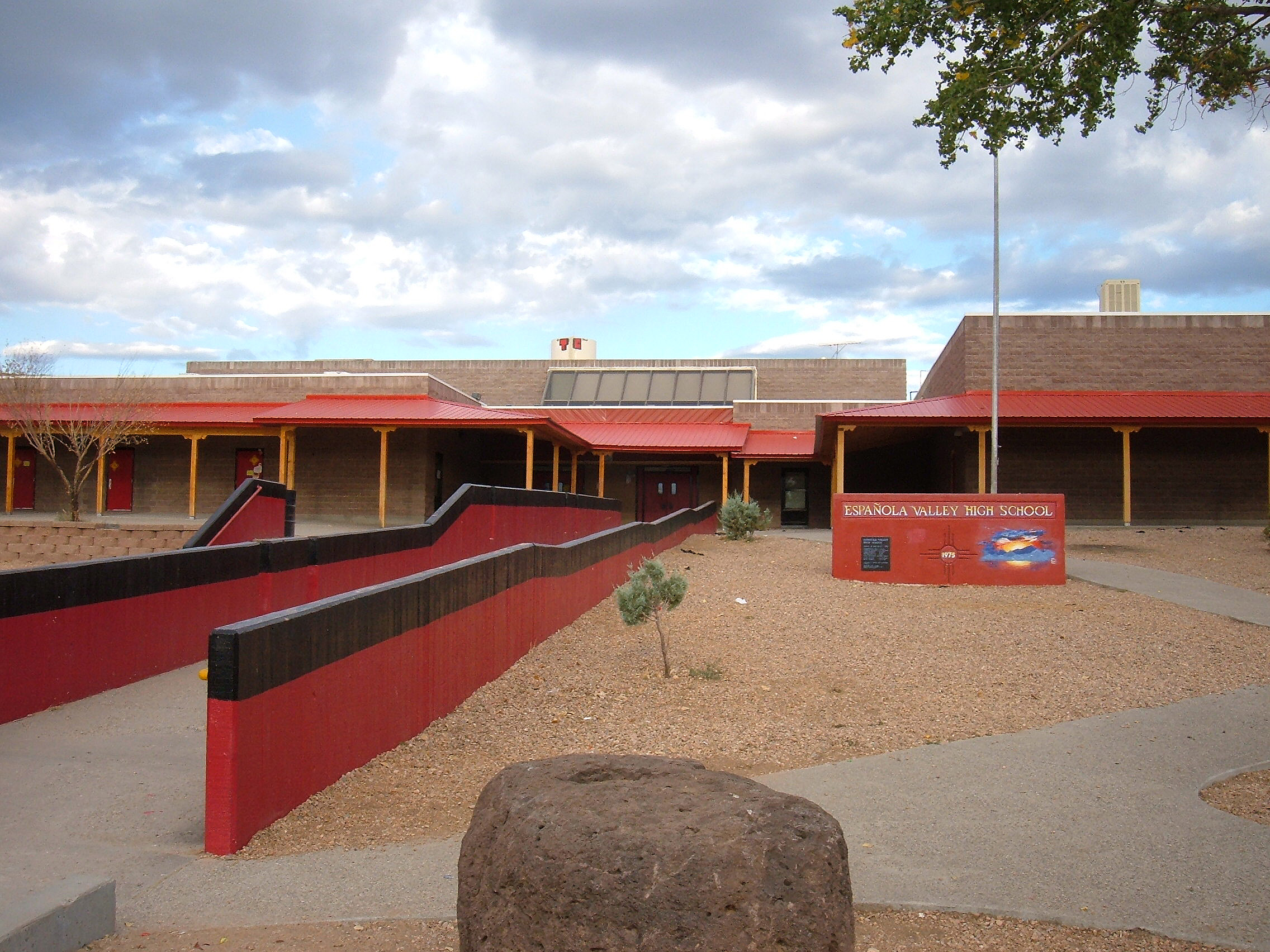
Española Valley High School

Secondary schools

- Española Valley High School
- Carlos F. Vigil Middle School

Elementary schools

- Abiquiu Elementary
- Alcalde Elementary
- Chimayo Elementary
- Dixon Elementary
- Eutimio "Tim" Salazar, III (Fairview) Elementary
- Hernandez Elementary
- James H. Rodriguez (Española) Elementary
- San Juan Elementary
- Tony E. Quintana (Sombrillo) Elementary
- Velarde Elementary

Kindergarten Centers

- Los Niños Kindergarten

== Gallery ==
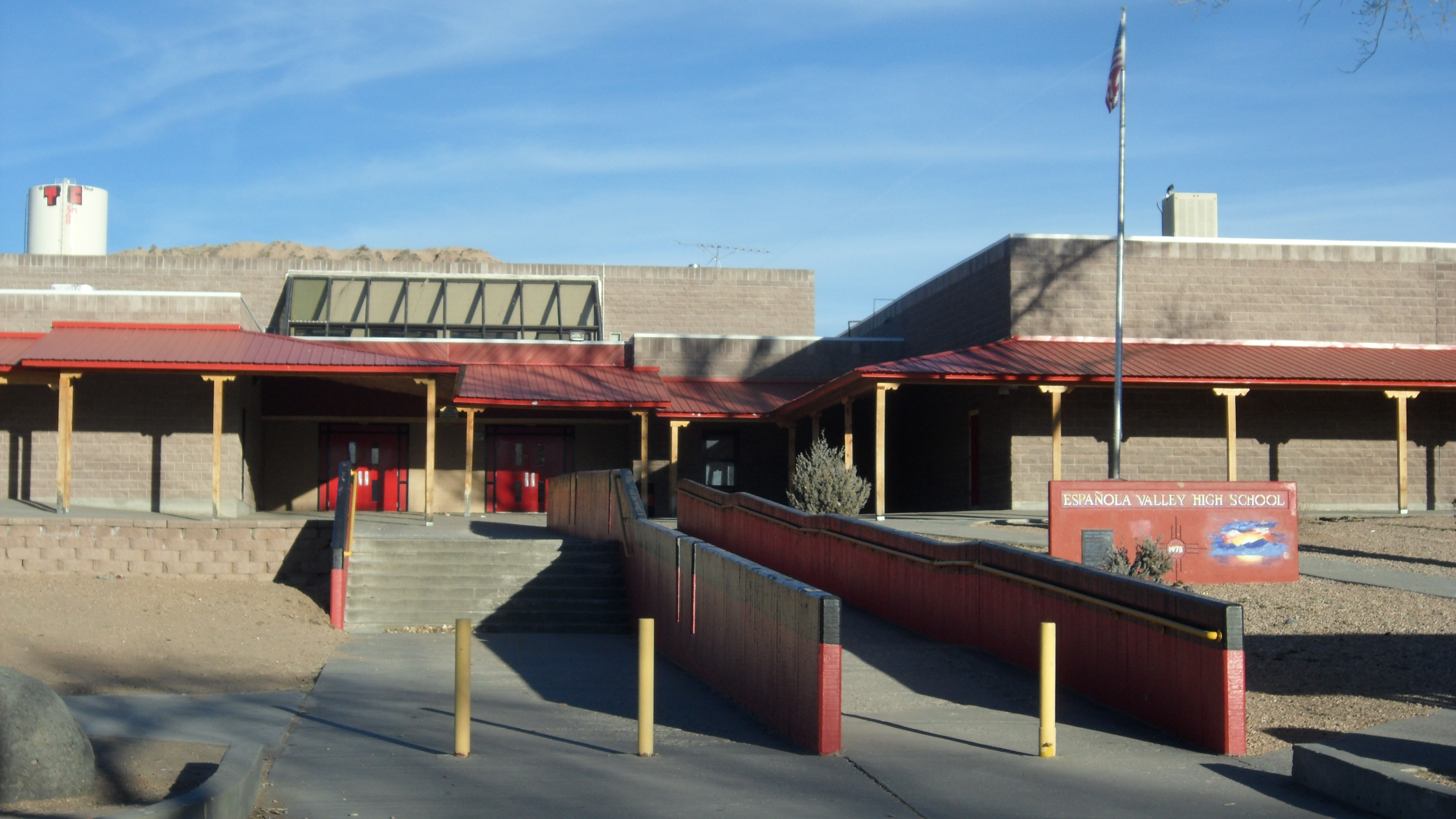
Española Valley High School

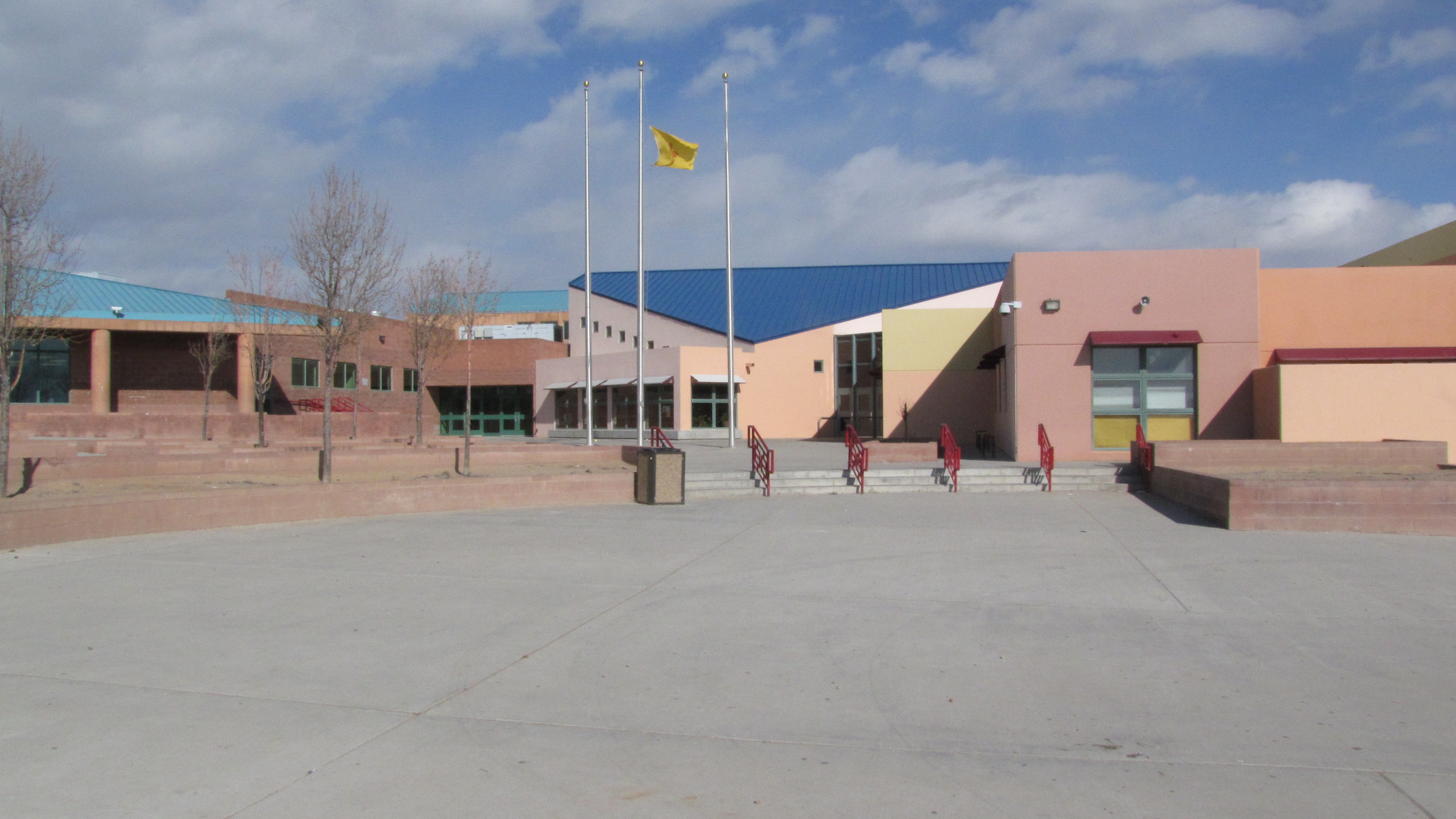
Carlos Vigil Middle School

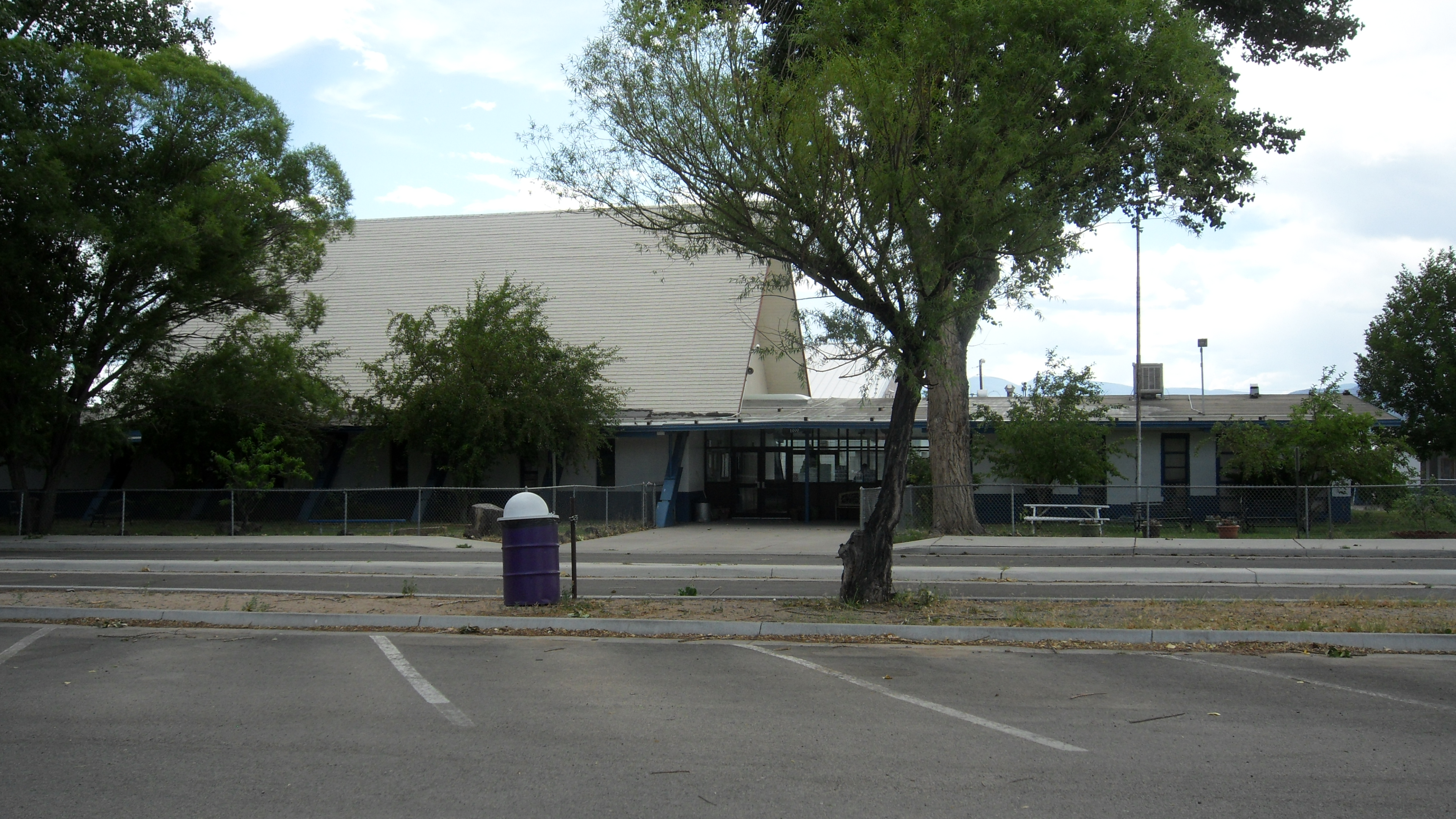
Eutimio "Tim" Salazar III (Fairview) Elementary School

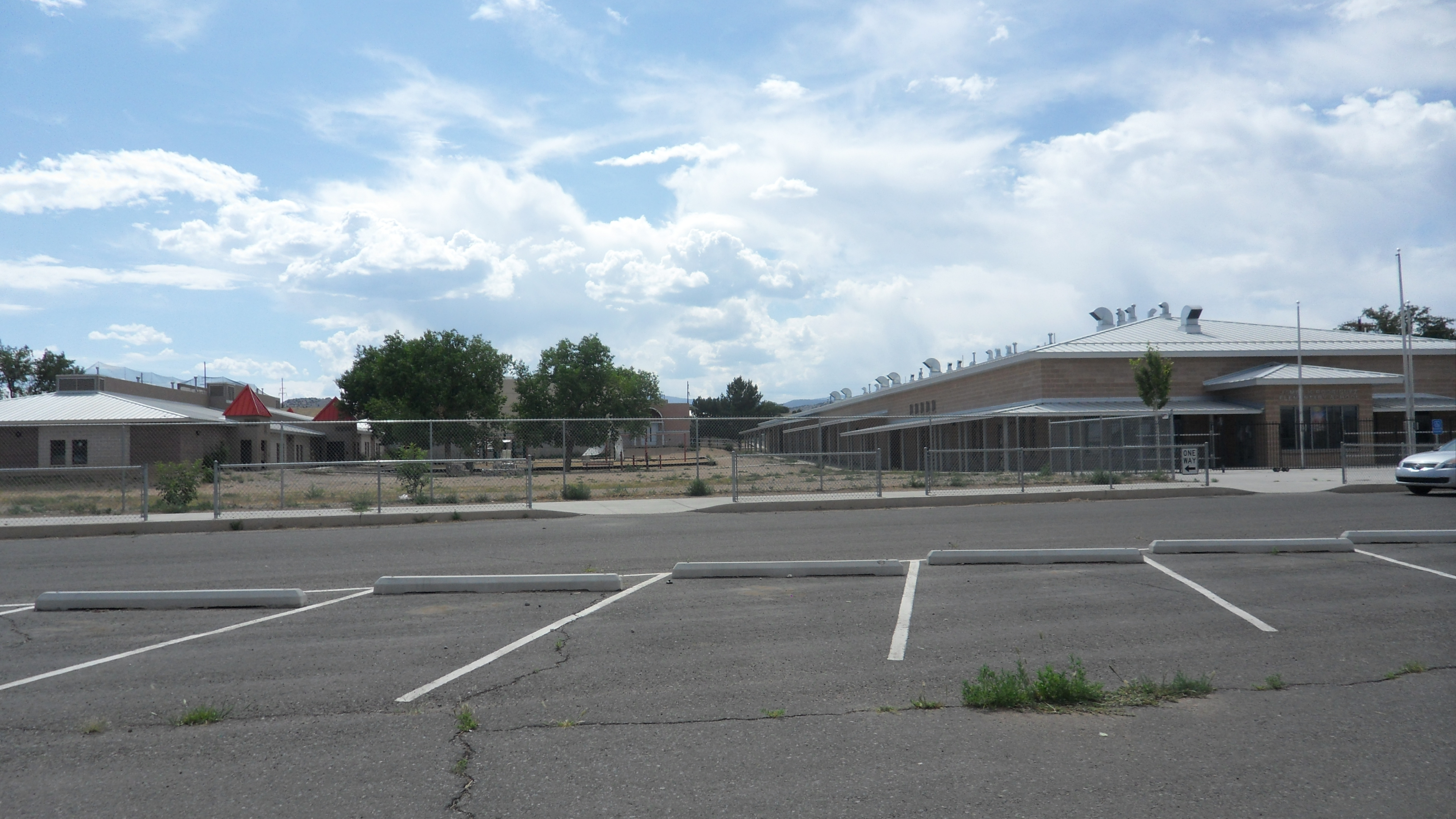
James H. Rodriguez (Española) Elementary School

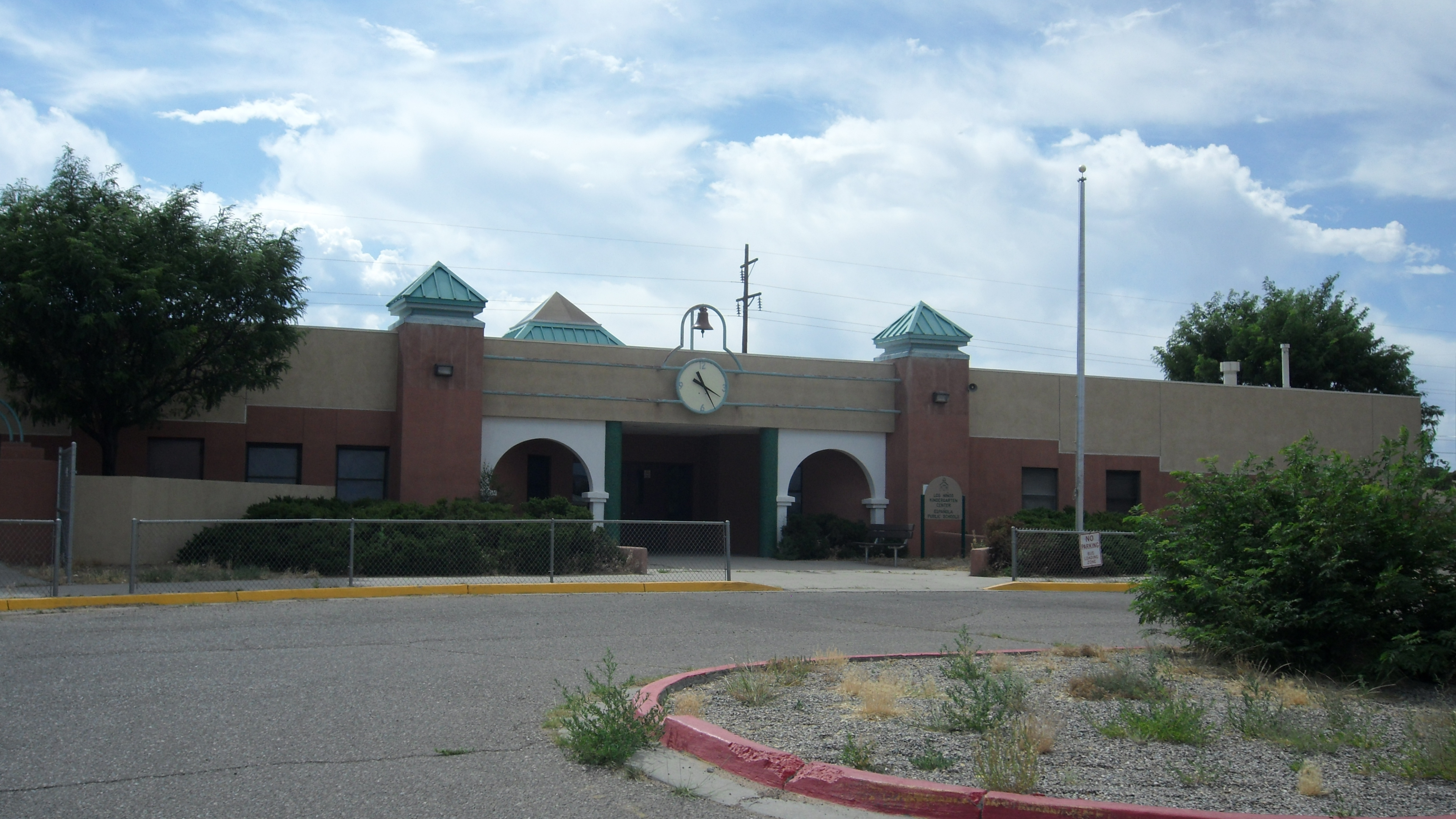
Los Niños Kindergarten Center
