= Hernandez, New Mexico =

Unincorporated community and CDP in New Mexico, US

Hernandez
- Unincorporated community and CDP
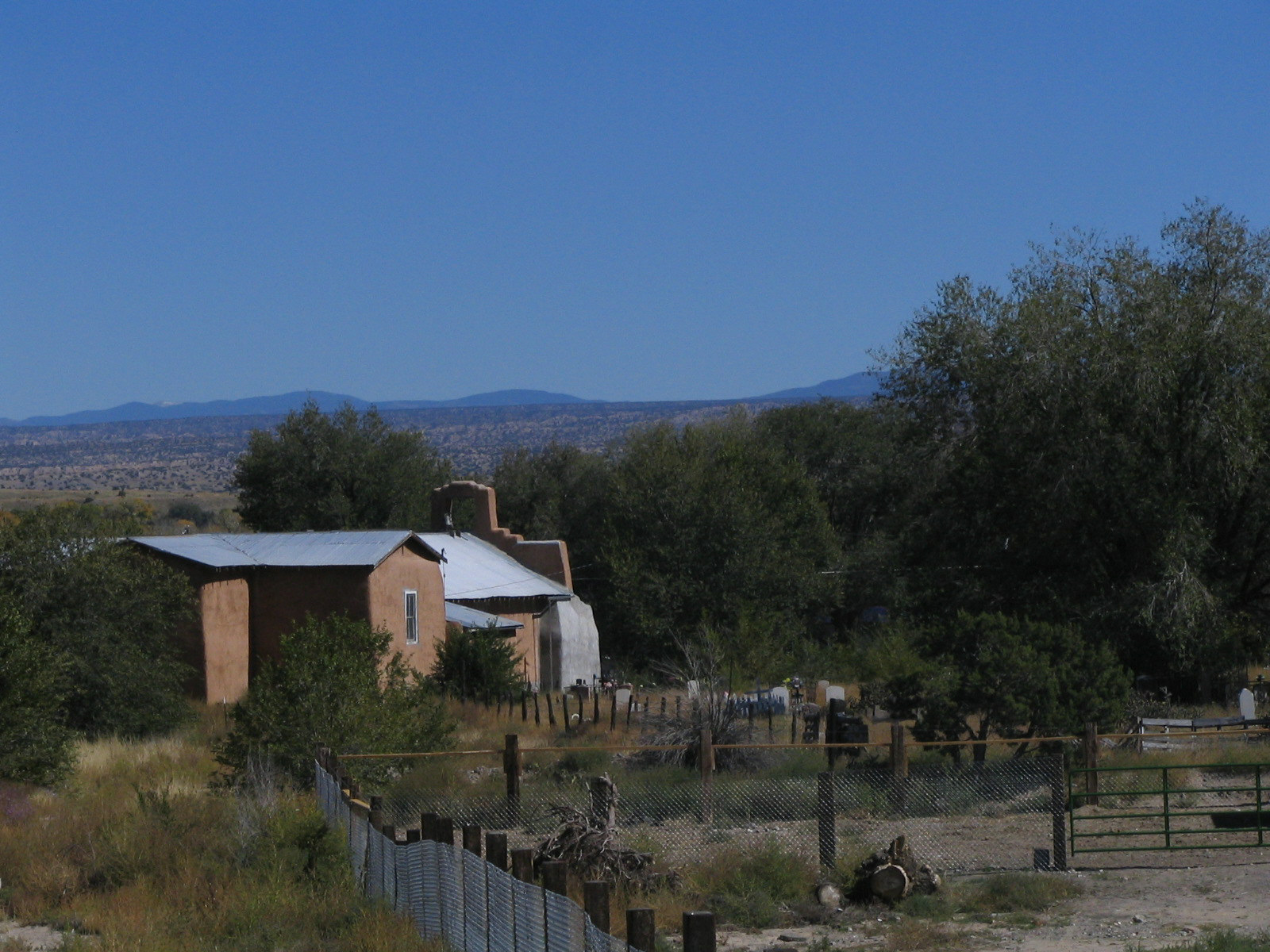

- Location within New Mexico
- Coordinates: 36°03′27″N 106°7′2″W
- Country: United States
- State: New Mexico
- County: Rio Arriba

Area
  - Total: 1.7 sq mi (4.4 km^{2})
- Elevation: 5,719 ft (1,743 m)

Population (2020)
  - Total: 756
- Time zone: UTC-7 (Mountain (MST))
  - Summer (DST): UTC-6 (MDT)
- ZIP code: 87537
- GNIS feature ID: 2584109

Hernandez is an unincorporated community and census-designated place in Rio Arriba County, New Mexico, United States. Hernandez is approximately 5 miles (8.0 km) northwest of Española on highway US 84 / US 285.

As of the 2020 census, Hernandez had a population of 756.

== Geography ==
Within the unincorporated community is the built-up CDP of Hernandez, with an area of 1.7 square miles (4.4 km^{2}). The Hernandez CDP had a population of 946 in the 2010 census,

The entire Hernandez area (55 square miles (140 km^{2})) has the ZIP code 87537, pointing to ZIP Code Tabulation Area 87537 (ZCTA), with a population of 2,957 in the 2010 U.S. census.

== Etymology ==
The name appears in New Mexico records dating from the 16th century.

== Demographics ==
The racial makeup of the Hernandez ZCTA was 58.4% White, 0.4% African American, 2.6% Native American, 0.4% Asian, 35.3% from other races, and 2.9% from two or more races. Hispanic or Latino of any race were 88.9% of the population.

== Education ==
It is in Española Public Schools. Hernandez has one elementary school, Hernandez Elementary. The comprehensive public high school is Española Valley High School.

== In popular culture ==
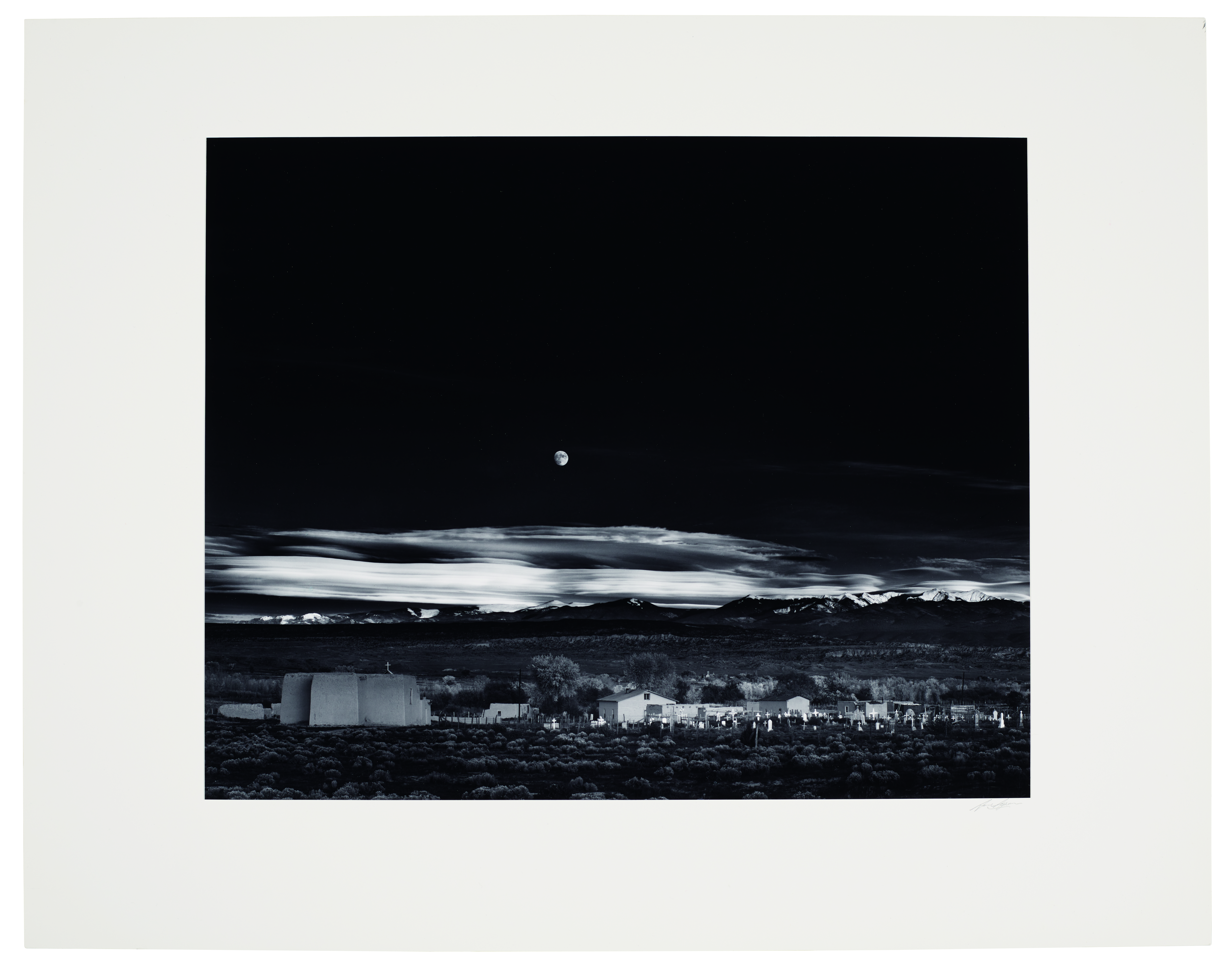
The Ansel Adams photograph

Hernandez became well known as the site of Moonrise, Hernandez, New Mexico, a black and white photograph taken by Ansel Adams, late in the afternoon on November 1, 1941, from a shoulder of highway US 84 / US 285. The fame of Hernandez grew when an escalation in the market value of photographic works was launched in 1971, when a 1948 print of this image of Hernandez sold at auction "for the then-unheard-of price of $71,500" ($568,400 today), with that same copy selling in 2006 for $609,600 ($973,600 today) at a Sotheby's New York auction.

In 1931, Georgia O'Keeffe visited the community and completed her painting Another Church, Hernandez, New Mexico, showing the front and partial interior of an adobe church in the community.

== See also ==
- List of most expensive photographs
