= San Jose, Rio Arriba County, New Mexico =

San Jose, New Mexico Hų́úˀįną̈ (Tewa)
- Census-designated place
- Location within New Mexico
- Coordinates: 36°02′21″N 106°05′53″W
- Country: United States
- State: New Mexico
- County: Rio Arriba

Area
  - Total: 1.809 sq mi (4.69 km^{2})
  - Land: 1.809 sq mi (4.69 km^{2})
  - Water: 0 sq mi (0 km^{2})
- Elevation: 5,853 ft (1,784 m)

Population (2010)
  - Total: 695
  - Density: 384/sq mi (148/km^{2})
- Time zone: UTC-7 (Mountain (MST))
  - Summer (DST): UTC-6 (MDT)
- Area code: 505
- GNIS feature ID: 2584206

San Jose (Tewa: Hų́úˀįną̈) is a census-designated place in Rio Arriba County, New Mexico, United States. Its population was 695 as of the 2010 census. U.S. routes 84 and 285 pass through the community.

== Geography ==
According to the U.S. Census Bureau, the community has an area of 1.809 square miles (4.69 km^{2}), all land.

== Education ==
San Jose is in Española Public Schools. The comprehensive public high school is Española Valley High School.
