= Te'ewi =

Te'ewi (Tewa: Tayˀe Wiˀi Ówîngeh Kayyee) or Teeuinge is a Tewa Pueblo ancestral site in an address-restricted area of Abiquiú, New Mexico. It was occupied from around 1250 until around 1500.

Te'ewi is one of the principal Tewa Pueblo ancestral sites in New Mexico, US. It is situated in the southerly angle formed by the juncture of Rio Oso and Rio Chama. The site measures approximately 525 feet (160 m) by 210 feet (64 m). It is a large ruin situated on the rim of the mesa overlooking the valley, just below the confluence of the two rivers. It is about .25 miles (0.40 km) south of the river, and the bluff on which it stands is about 200 feet (61 m). The pueblo was constructed of adobe with some use of lava blocks in the foundation walls, and is now reduced to low mounds. It was built in two large adjoining quadrangles, or as one long rectangle divided by cross walls into two courts. The walls have a perimeter of 1,470 feet (450 m). Within and contiguous to the pueblo are ten circular, subterranean kivas. A few yards to the east is a ruined shrine in circular form, 8 feet (2.4 m) in diameter, built of lava blocks set on edge.

Coordinates: 36°06′15″N 106°09′14″W
