= Courts of New Mexico =

Courts of New Mexico include:

State courts of New Mexico

- New Mexico Supreme Court
  - New Mexico Court of Appeals
    - New Mexico District Court (13 judicial districts)
      - New Mexico Magistrate Court
      - Bernalillo County Metropolitan Court
      - New Mexico Municipal Court
      - New Mexico Probate Court

Federal courts located in New Mexico

- United States District Court for the District of New Mexico

== Gallery ==
Courts of New Mexico
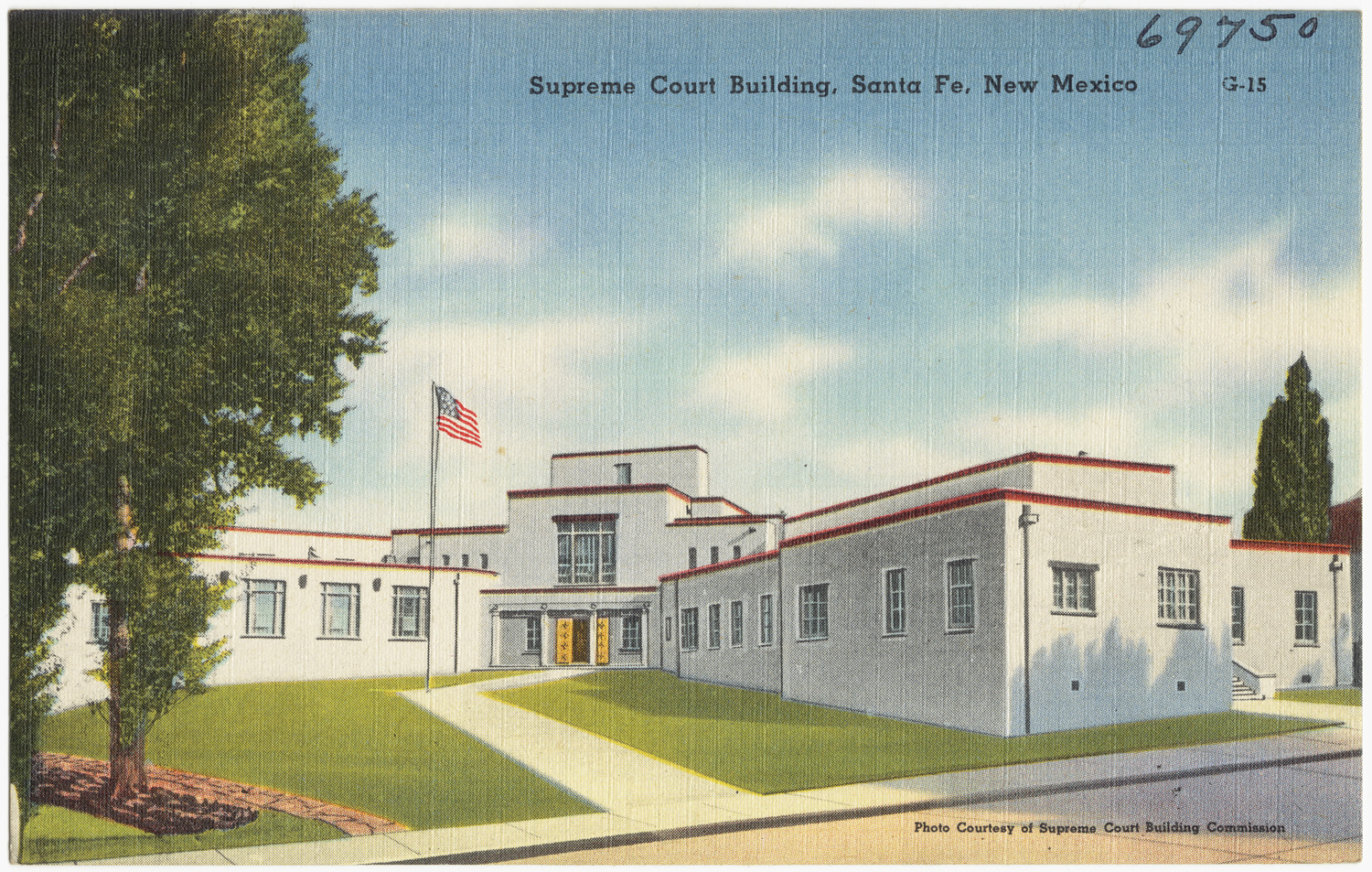
Supreme Court Building in Santa Fe, New Mexico

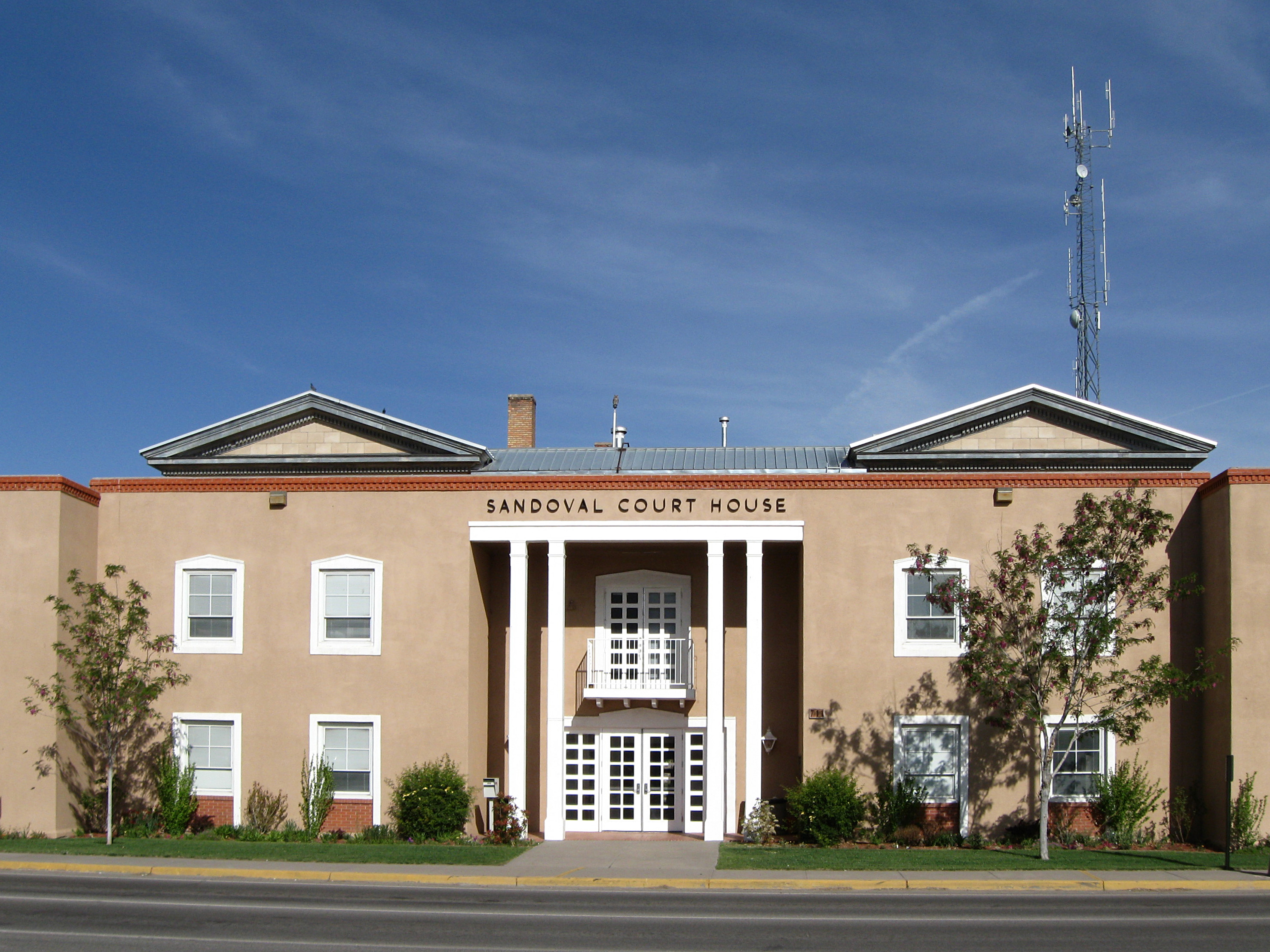
Sandoval County Courthouse

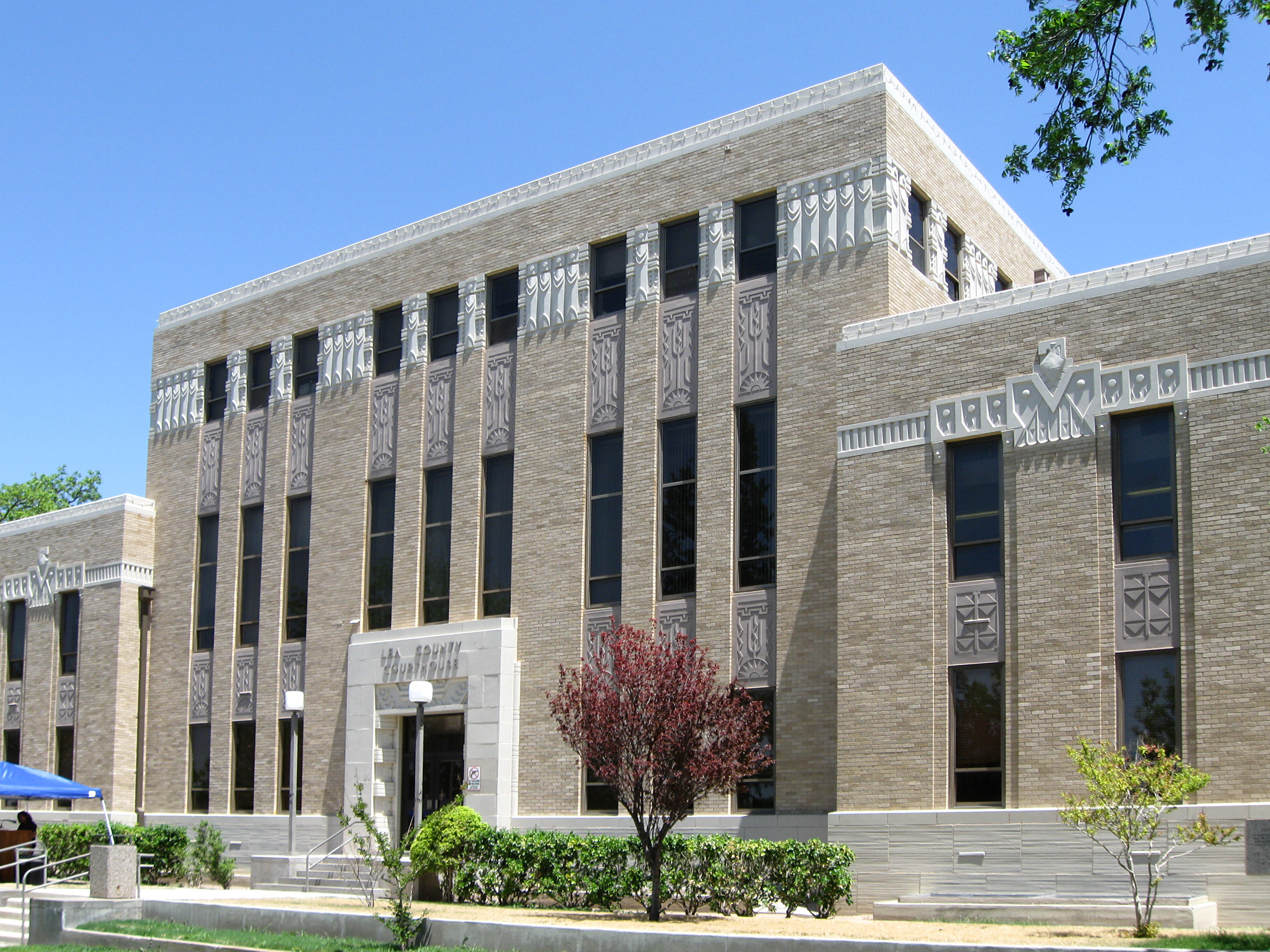
Lea County Courthouse

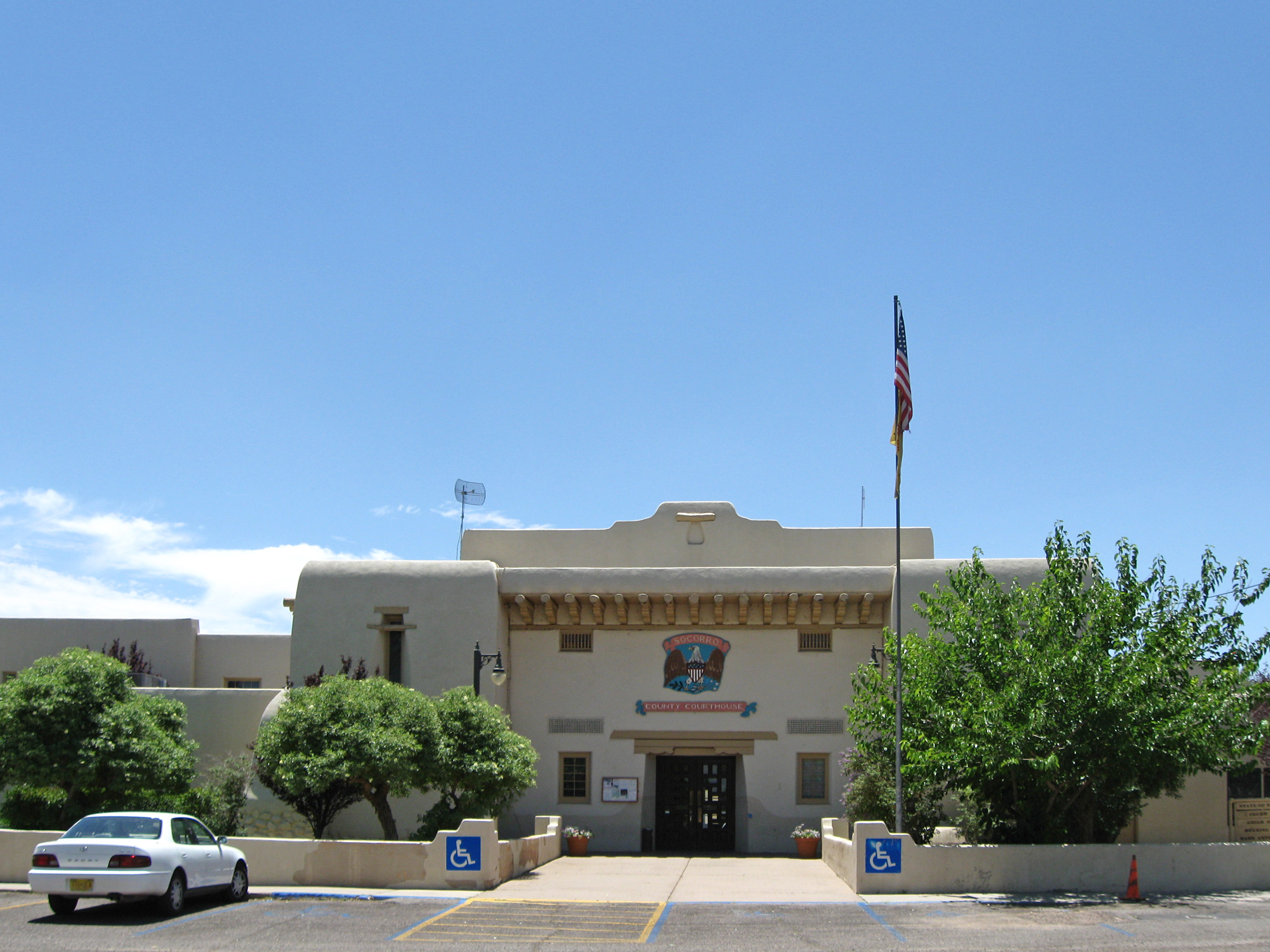
Socorro County Courthouse

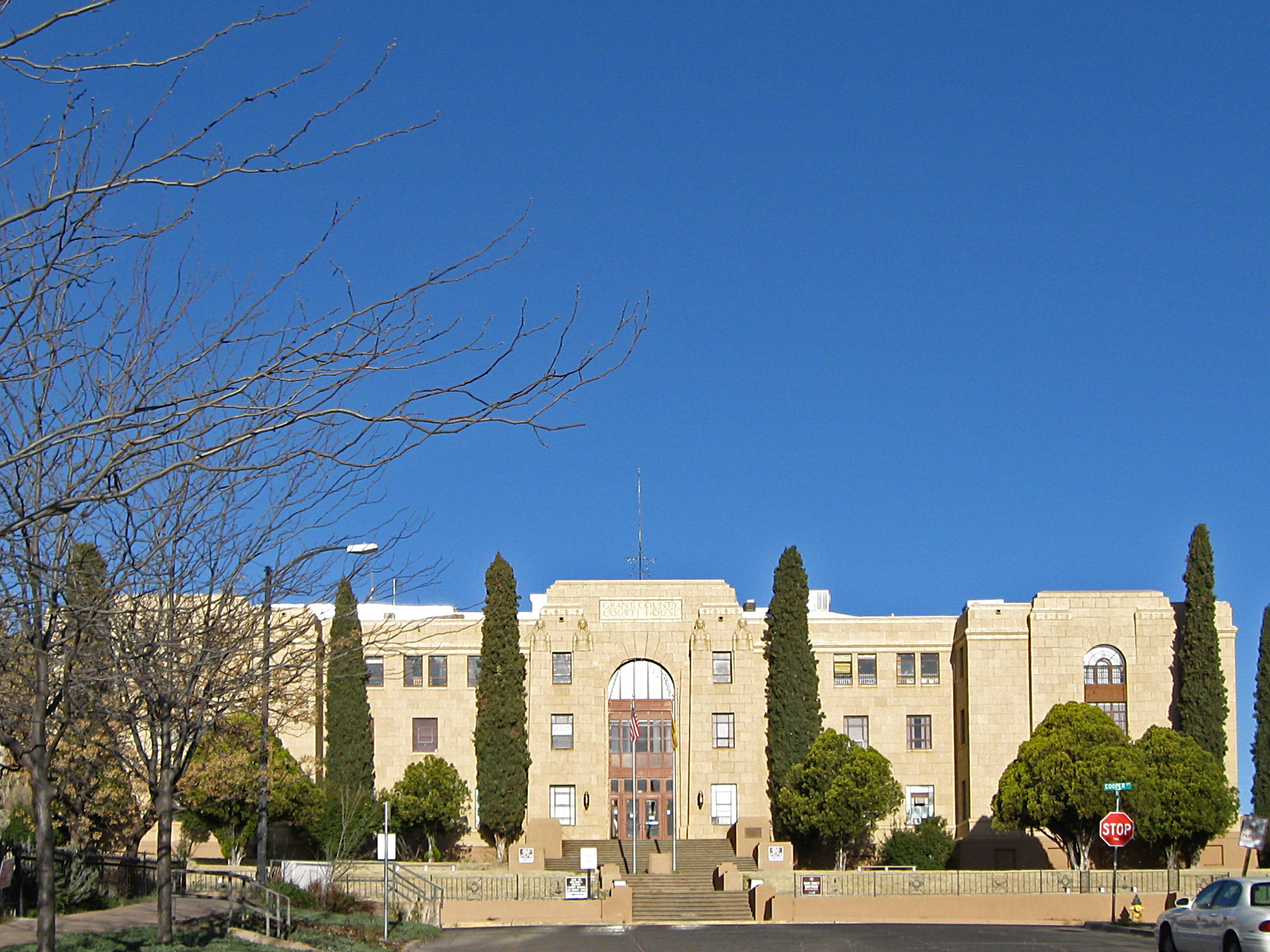
Grant County Courthouse

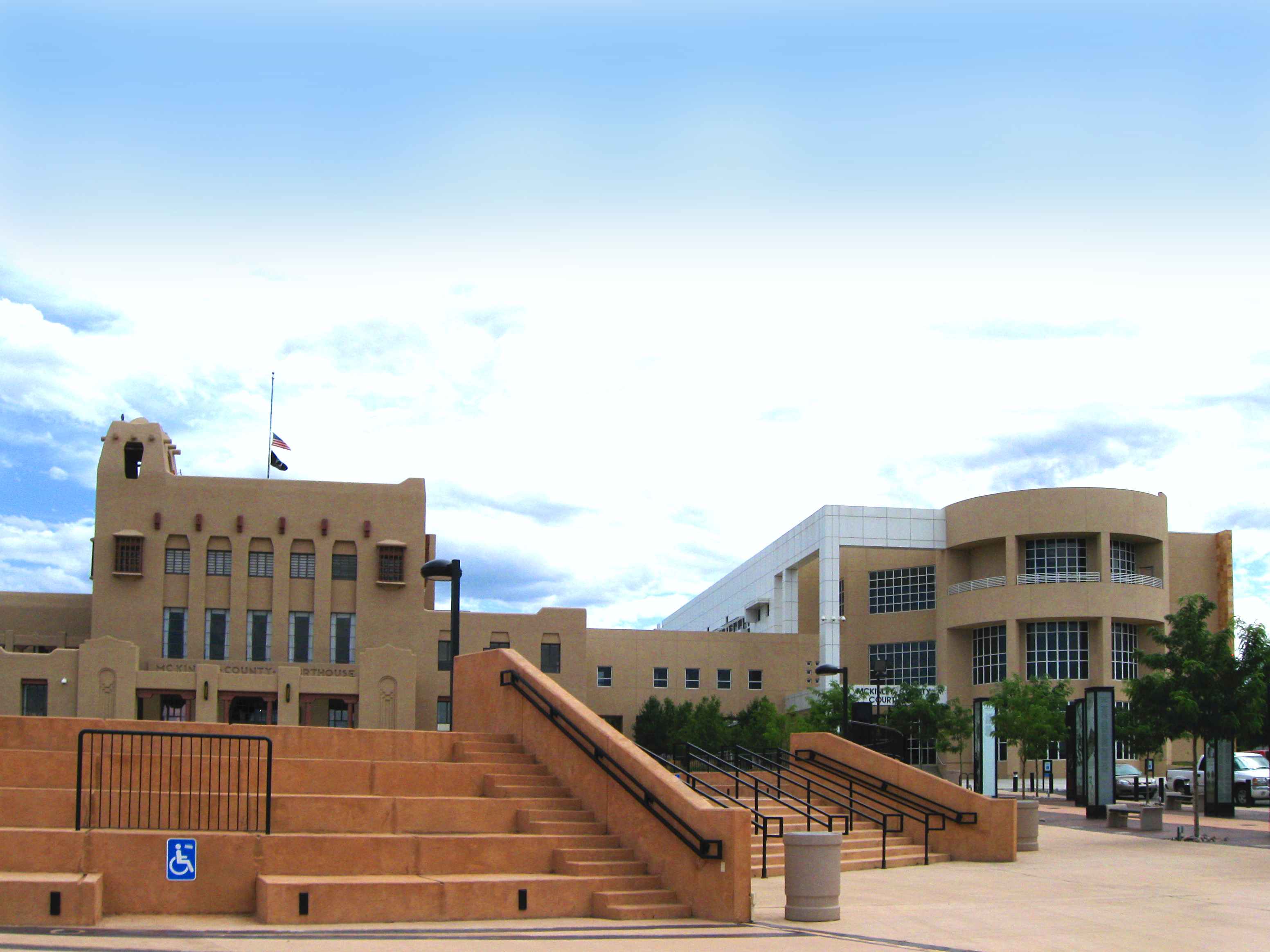
McKinley County Courthouse
