= International District, Albuquerque, New Mexico =

International District
- Neighborhood of Albuquerque
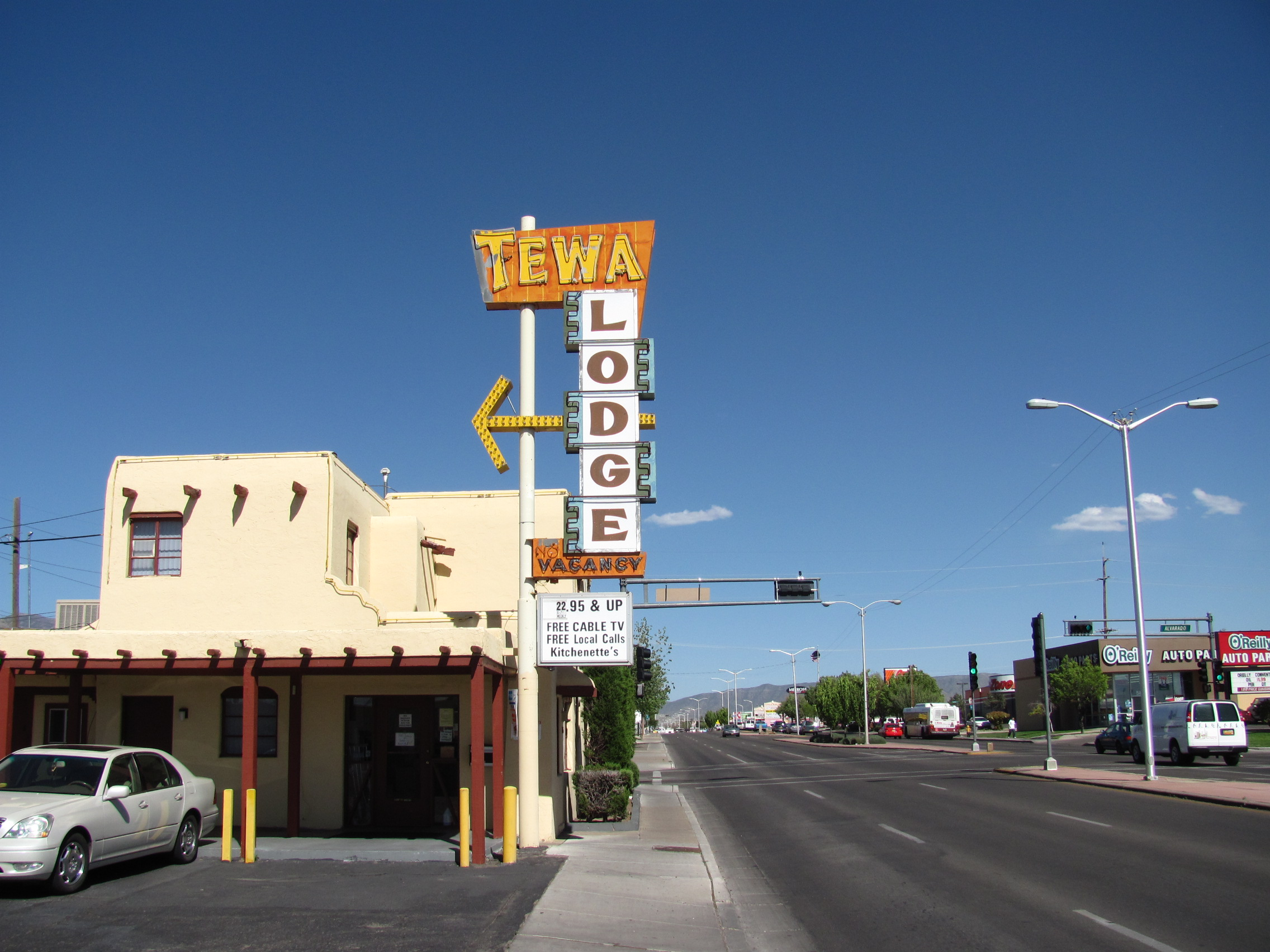
- The Tewa Lodge on Central Ave.
- Interactive map of International District
- Coordinates: 35°4′21″N 106°34′06″W
- Country: United States
- State: New Mexico
- County: Bernalillo
- City: Albuquerque

Government
  - City Council: Nichole Rogers
  - State House: G. Andrés Romero (D); Debra M. Sariñana (D); Kay Bounkeua (D)
  - State Senate: Antoinette Sedillo Lopez (D); Mimi Stewart (D)
  - U.S. House: Melanie Stansbury (D)

Area
  - Total: 3.87 sq mi (10.0 km^{2})

Population (2010)
  - Total: 29,796
  - Density: 7,699/sq mi (2,973/km^{2})
- ZIP Code: 87108
- Area code: 505

The International District is a neighborhood in southeast Albuquerque, New Mexico. It is centered on Central Avenue, the historic alignment of U.S. Route 66, and contains the New Mexico State Fairgrounds. The community is one of the most diverse areas of the city and is home to a large number of international restaurants and grocery stores, as well as the city's "Little Saigon" Vietnamese enclave.

== Geography ==
As defined by the city of Albuquerque's Sector Development Plan, the International District consists of the 3.9-square-mile (10 km^{2}) area bounded by San Mateo Boulevard, Lomas Boulevard, Wyoming Boulevard, and Gibson Boulevard. This area includes the communities of Fair West, La Mesa, South San Pedro, Trumbull Village, and Elder Homestead, as well as Expo New Mexico, the site of the New Mexico State Fair. The district was similarly defined in resolutions passed by the Albuquerque City Council and New Mexico State Senate, although Siesta Hills was not explicitly mentioned. The neighborhood's main commercial thoroughfares are Central Avenue, Zuni Road, and Gibson Boulevard (east-west) and San Pedro Drive and Louisiana Boulevard (north-south). As Central is the dividing axis of Albuquerque's quadrant system, the International District is split between the Northeast and Southeast quadrants.

== Demographics ==
As of the 2010 Census, the International District had a total population of 29,796.

The racial makeup of the neighborhood was:

- 34.6% Latino
- 23.8% White
- 8.2% Native American
- 5.7% Black or African American
- 2.6% Asian
- 0.1% Native Hawaiian and Other Pacific Islander
- 5.3% Multiracial (two or more races)

Hispanic or Latino people of any race made up 60% of the population.

In 2016, an estimated 41% of neighborhood residents were below the federal poverty level.

== History ==
Before World War II, the area that now makes up the International District was mostly unpopulated apart from the small community of La Mesa and a few other scattered homesteads, some owned by African Americans. The New Mexico State Fairgrounds were built there in 1938. After the war, Albuquerque experienced a major population boom, with many new residents attracted by government jobs at Kirtland Air Force Base and Sandia National Laboratories. As the city's population soared from 35,499 to 201,189 between 1940 and 1960, neighborhoods in the eastern part of the city like the International District were rapidly developed. Meanwhile, a business district filled with motels, diners, and service stations developed along Central Avenue, which was designated as part of the famous U.S. Route 66 in 1937.

In the 1960s, the area struggled economically after Kirtland transferred much of its personnel to on-base housing and Interstate 40 took most of the long-haul traffic away from Route 66. The International District's abundance of low-cost motels and apartments made it a landing place for immigrants and other newcomers to the city, including refugees from Southeast Asia (especially Vietnam) and later Central America. However, the neighborhood also attracted a significant amount of criminal activity, which led to alarmist media and residents to refer to it pejoratively as the "War Zone" by the late 1980s. A 1991 article from the Albuquerque Journal described East Central as "a loose-jointed carnival of sex, drugs and booze" with drug dealers and prostitutes operating openly. Violent crime was a problem as well, with 34 homicides recorded in southeast Albuquerque in 1996 (more than half of the city's total) and 11 in Trumbull Village alone. In 1997, the city put up barricades in the neighborhood to make it harder for criminals to get in and out.

Eventually, thanks in part to efforts by neighborhood residents, the crime rate decreased and the barricades were removed. After advocating for a new description of the area in 2009, the city re-classified the area officially as the International District to highlight its diversity rather than its criminal activity. The first International Festival was held later that year. Despite these changes, crime has continued to be an issue in the neighborhood. In 2017, the Journal reported that it was "the most violent place in the city in the past three years and is home to both victims and suspects." Between 2014 and 2016, 10% of addresses in the neighborhood reported a violent crime, and 25% reported a property crime. One business in the neighborhood reported 98 violent crimes during that period. In 2018, the International District was ranked as the worst neighborhood in New Mexico for the health and well-being of young children.

== Points of interest ==
Two sites in the International District are listed on the National Register of Historic Places: the National Humane Alliance Animal Fountain, which sits in front of the headquarters of Animal Humane New Mexico on Virginia St., and the Tewa Lodge on Central Ave. Another historic motel, the La Mesa Motel, is no longer standing. Other notable sites include the New Mexico State Fairgrounds (Expo New Mexico), Tingley Coliseum, the Bank of the West Tower, once New Mexico's tallest building, and the Cal-Linn Building, which was the original headquarters of Microsoft. The neighborhood is also known for its assortment of international restaurants and grocery stores.

== Education ==
Albuquerque Public Schools operates two elementary schools, Emerson and La Mesa, and two middle schools, Wilson and Van Buren, in the International District. Students in some parts of the neighborhood also attend Hawthorne, Mark Twain, Sandia Base, Wherry, Whittier, Bandelier, and Zia Elementary Schools, and Hayes Middle School. High school students in the International District attend Highland High School.

== Transportation ==
ABQ Ride operates public transit in the neighborhood, including the 11 Lomas, 16 Broadway-University-Gibson, 31 Wyoming, 34 San Pedro Commuter, 66 Central, 96 Crosstown Commuter, 97 Zuni, 98 Wyoming Commuter, 140/141 San Mateo, 157 Montaño-Uptown-Kirtland, 217 Downtown-Kirtland Limited, 222 Rio Bravo-Sunport-Kirtland, 766 Rapid Ride Red Line, and 777 Rapid Ride Green Line city bus routes. The Albuquerque Rapid Transit (ART) bus rapid transit system also serves the International District via its San Mateo, San Pedro, Louisiana, and Wyoming stations.
