= Monte Largo, New Mexico =

Landform in Bernalillo County, New Mexico

Monte Largo
- Location within New Mexico Location within the United States

Highest point
- Elevation: 7,691 ft (2,344 m)
- Prominence: 580 ft (180 m)
- Parent peak: South Mountain
- Isolation: 3.32 mi (5.34 km) to South Mountain
- Coordinates: 35°11′0″N 106°16′40″W

Geography
- Location: Bernalillo County, New Mexico, United States
- Topo map: USGS Sandia Park

Geology
- Rock age: Early Proterozoic
- Rock type: Metarhyolite

Climbing
- Easiest route: Hike

Monte Largo is a mountain in Bernalillo County, New Mexico, 5 miles (8 km) northeast of San Antonito. In New Mexico, Monte Largo is ranked the 1372nd highest peak, and 695th by prominence.
