= Sandia Knolls, New Mexico =

- Census-designated place
- Location within New Mexico
- Coordinates: 35°09′38″N 106°17′56″W
- Country: United States
- State: New Mexico
- County: Bernalillo

Area
  - Total: 2.80 sq mi (7.26 km^{2})
  - Land: 2.80 sq mi (7.26 km^{2})
  - Water: 0 sq mi (0.00 km^{2})
- Elevation: 6,903 ft (2,104 m)

Population (2020)
  - Total: 1,252
  - Density: 446.7/sq mi (172.48/km^{2})
- Time zone: UTC-7 (Mountain (MST))
  - Summer (DST): UTC-6 (MDT)
- Area code: 505
- FIPS code: 35-66890
- GNIS feature ID: 2584203

Sandia Knolls is a census-designated place (CDP) in Bernalillo County, New Mexico, United States. As of the 2020 census, Sandia Knolls had a population of 1,252. It is part of the Albuquerque Metropolitan Statistical Area.

== Geography ==
Sandia Knolls is located in northeastern Bernalillo County, at the southern end of a small mountain known as Monte Largo, east of the Sandia Mountains. It is bordered to the north by an undeveloped portion of the town of Edgewood, and the CDPs of San Antonito and Sandia Park are 3 miles (5 km) to the west.

According to the United States Census Bureau, the Sandia Knolls CDP has a total area of 2.8 square miles (7.2 km^{2}), all land.

== Demographics ==
Historical population
Census	Pop.	Note	%±
2020	1,252		—
U.S. Decennial Census

== Education ==
It is zoned to Albuquerque Public Schools.
