= Homelessness in New Mexico =

New Mexico, US

Homelessness is a serious issue throughout the state of New Mexico. Through a demographic examination it becomes evident that New Mexico has a high proportion of social groups that are currently and historically socioeconomically disadvantaged. Native Americans as a proportion of the US population represent the second highest amongst all States with only Alaska having a higher ratio, while it also has a large Hispanic population. Homelessness is a direct cause from an individual not being able to provide themselves with the most basic of necessities to maintain a healthy life hence having a higher proportion of individuals in poverty places a greater risk of an individual becoming homeless.

New Mexico's homeless population is largely concentrated in Albuquerque, although homeless populations generally exist on a marginally lower scale in Santa Fe and Las Cruces.

New Mexico's homeless population peaked in 2020, where it hit 3,300, roughly less than 0.2% of the state's population. This figure declined since then; however, statistics on homelessness are often inaccurate due to miscounts because of COVID-19, or the count being done in the wintertime, where fewer homeless are outside in public to be counted.

Albuquerque’s homeless population is 2,740, around half a percent of the city’s population, from a 2024 count, though the NM Coalition to End Homelessness states in the Point In Time Count Report that this number is "certainly an undercount".

== Loitering and panhandling laws ==
Due to New Mexico's strong laws against loitering, sleeping in cars and begging (traits a lot of homeless people are forced to do) they are disproportionately over-represented in the prison system. Police officials can accuse any person they believe may have attempted to disrupt the peace, regardless of whether or not the offense presents danger to the community. Panhandling is an umbrella term that represents begging, sponging and spanging. In the state of New Mexico there are strict regulations on panhandling. Moreover, homeless people are prohibited to beg after dark and if they do they are often sent to jail. In an attempt to remove homeless people from the streets, it is common for the police to dispose of their property. The above conditions cause the mere act of being homeless to become a self-perpetuating cycle of incarceration.

== Albuquerque and Bernalillo County ==
Albuquerque's unhoused population is primarily associated off Central Avenue in the International District. The area was pejoratively nicknamed as the "War Zone" by some media and residents until 2009, when the city officially renamed it as the International District because of its diverse population and businesses. The first International Festival was held later that year. Despite these changes, crime has continued to be an issue in the neighborhood. In 2017, the Journal reported that it was "the most violent place in the city in the past three years and is home to both victims and suspects." Between 2014 and 2016, 10% of addresses in the neighborhood reported a violent crime, and 25% reported a property crime. One business in the neighborhood reported 98 violent crimes during that period. In 2018, the International District was ranked as the worst neighborhood in New Mexico for the health and well-being of young children.

Like many major American cities, Albuquerque has struggled with a homelessness issue that became more visibly problematic since the 2000s. According to Rock at Noon Day, a homeless services center, there were an estimated 4-5,000 homeless living in the Albuquerque metropolitan area as of 2019. Albuquerque Public Schools spokeswoman Monica Armenta said the number of homeless kids enrolled in district schools, meaning children from families that have no permanent address, has consistently ranged from 3,200 to 3,500. The Coordinated Entry System, a centralized citywide system that the city uses to track and fill supportive housing openings when they become available, shows that about 5,000 households experienced homelessness last year. The International District, off Central Avenue, has a serious issue with blight and homelessness. Fentanyl and methamphetamine use is a frequent occurrence in the International District, as well as some areas adjacent to Nob Hill and Downtown.

=== Count ===
The most recent NM Point-in-Time Report by the New Mexico Coalition to End Homelessness on behalf of US Department of Housing and Urban Development counted 1,231 people living on the streets of Albuquerque (around 0.2% of the city's population) in January 2024. The report also counted 1,289 people living in an emergency shelter in Albuquerque and 220 living in transitional housing in the City. The Total for the Albuquerque Count was 2,740 across the city.

For the "Balance of State" (meaning the rest of the state outside of Albuquerque), those numbers were 746 in emergency shelters, 152 in Transitional housing, and 1,011 unsheltered on that same night in January 2024. The total number counted in the entire state (including Albuquerque) was 4,649 (2,740 Albuquerque and 1,909 for the "Balance of State.")

Since 2021, the NM Coalition to End Homelessness has organized the annual Point in Time Count and published the Point in Time Report for the state.

=== Encampment closures ===
In August 2022, the city permanently closed Coronado park, displacing nearly over 100 people who occupied an encampment in the downtown park. The city conducted 110 surveys of the parks residents, and offered temporary motel vouchers to 24 of them. Mayor Keller claimed that the closure was in the interest of the people who were residing in the park, though many of the displaced campers claimed otherwise.

In response to the closure, several of the residents of the former encampment filed a lawsuit represented by the ACLU of New Mexico. The lawsuits alleged that the City violated the camper's constitutional rights by destroying their property and forcing them to leave without providing alternative accommodations. In 2023, Judge Joshua Allison ordered a temporary injunction which prohibited the city from destroying unhoused people's belongings during encampment closures. The injunction went into effect on November 1 and was in place until May 17, 2024, after the Judge vacated the order in part due to its uninforcibility. The Supreme Court of the United States decision on City of Grants Pass v. Johnson case further enabled local governments to continue destroying the belongings of people experiencing homelessness. In response, a newsletter from the city's government stated, "The City appreciates more flexibility to enforce ordinances and will continue to protect the rights of unhoused individuals."

In the 2024 NM Point In Time report, 497 of the 786 unsheltered people surveyed indicated that in the year prior the city had closed their encampment 5 times or more. All 768 had experienced an encampment closure at one point in the year prior, and 81.7% said they had lost their birth certificate during a closure, 87.6% lost their state ID or license, 80.9% said they lost their social security card, 50.1% said they lost prescribed medication(s), 77.5% lost their phone/tablet. In February 2024 the Albuquerque Human Rights Board adopted a resolution describing the practice of encampment closures without notice as "indistinguishable from theft, [violating] the autonomy, dignity, and rights of people experiencing homelessness."

== Española and Valencia County ==
In August 2024, the town of Española, New Mexico closed an encampment of over 30 unhoused people after months of complaints from housed residents in the area following a town hall meeting on public safety with Michelle Lujan Grisham, and subsequent ordinance banning encampments on public property. The encampment was allowed to stay for an unknown period of time longer than initially reported, but after a few days, the people all disappeared. The City was unclear about where they had all gone, and why their belongings were all left behind. Later reports claim that the police arrested at least one camper, and a number of them simply left.

== See also ==
- Homelessness in the United States by state
