= San Antonito Church and Cemetery =

Historic site in Bernalillo County, New Mexico

- U.S. National Register of Historic Places
- NM State Register of Cultural Properties
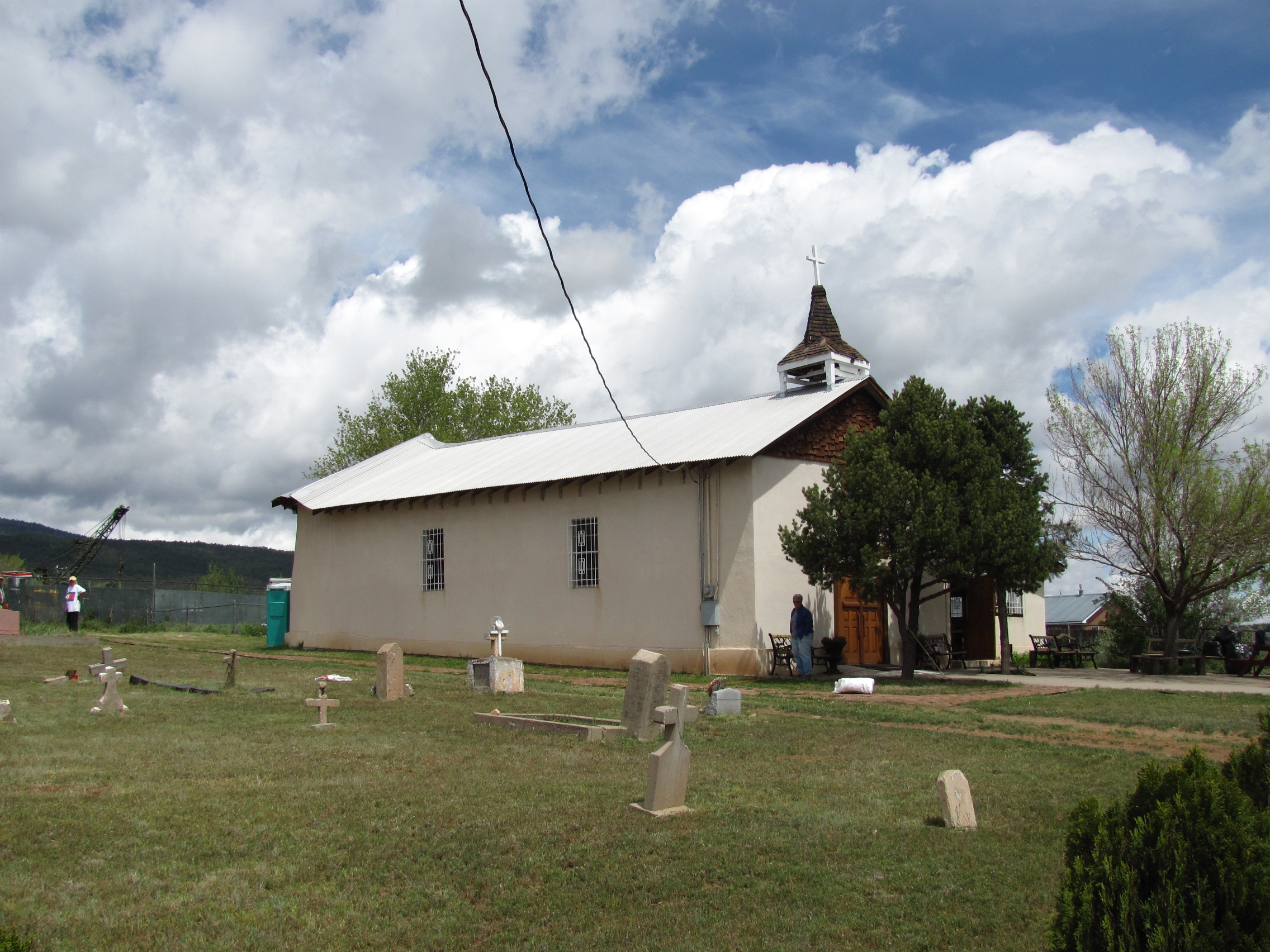

- Location within New Mexico Location within the United States
- Location: Jct. of NM 14 and NM 536, NW corner, San Antonito, Bernalillo County, New Mexico, U.S.
- Coordinates: 35°9′50″N 106°20′46″W
- Area: 1.5 acres (0.61 ha)
- Built: 1886
- Architectural style: territorial
- MPS: Religious Properties of New Mexico MPS
- NRHP reference No.: 96001607
- NMSRCP No.: 1643

Significant dates
- Added to NRHP: January 16, 1997
- Designated NMSRCP: September 27, 1996

San Antonito Church and Cemetery is a historic Catholic church building and cemetery built in 1886 in San Antonito, New Mexico. It was added to the multiple properties listing of religious properties for the National Register of Historic Places on January 6, 1997.

== See also ==
- National Register of Historic Places listings in Bernalillo County, New Mexico
