= Pajarito Mesa, New Mexico =

- Census-designated place
- Location within New Mexico
- Coordinates: 34°59′51″N 106°45′50″W
- Country: United States
- State: New Mexico
- County: Bernalillo

Area
  - Total: 21.27 sq mi (55.09 km^{2})
  - Land: 21.27 sq mi (55.09 km^{2})
  - Water: 0 sq mi (0.00 km^{2})
- Elevation: 5,480 ft (1,670 m)

Population (2020)
  - Total: 260
  - Density: 12.2/sq mi (4.72/km^{2})
- Time zone: UTC-7 (Mountain (MST))
  - Summer (DST): UTC-6 (MDT)
- Area code: 505
- FIPS code: 35-54940
- GNIS feature ID: 2584171

Pajarito Mesa is a census-designated place in Bernalillo County, New Mexico, United States. As of the 2020 census, Pajarito Mesa had a population of 260. It is part of the Albuquerque Metropolitan Statistical Area.

Pajarito Mesa is an informal settlement lacking basic services including electricity, running water, and formal roads, and existing largely outside of government regulation. It does not meet the U.S. government definition of a colonia because it is more than 150 miles (240 km) from the U.S.–Mexico border, but otherwise exhibits the same features as a colonia. The mesa was first settled in the 1970s and the population had grown to about 250 families by 2013.

== Geography ==
Pajarito Mesa is located on a mesa between the Rio Grande and Rio Puerco valleys, about 10 miles (16 km) southwest of central Albuquerque.

According to the United States Census Bureau, the CDP has a total area of 12.5 square miles (32.4 km^{2}), all land.

== Demographics ==
Historical population
Census	Pop.	Note	%±
2020	260		—
U.S. Decennial Census

== Education ==
It is zoned to Albuquerque Public Schools.
