= Cedro, New Mexico =

- Census-designated place
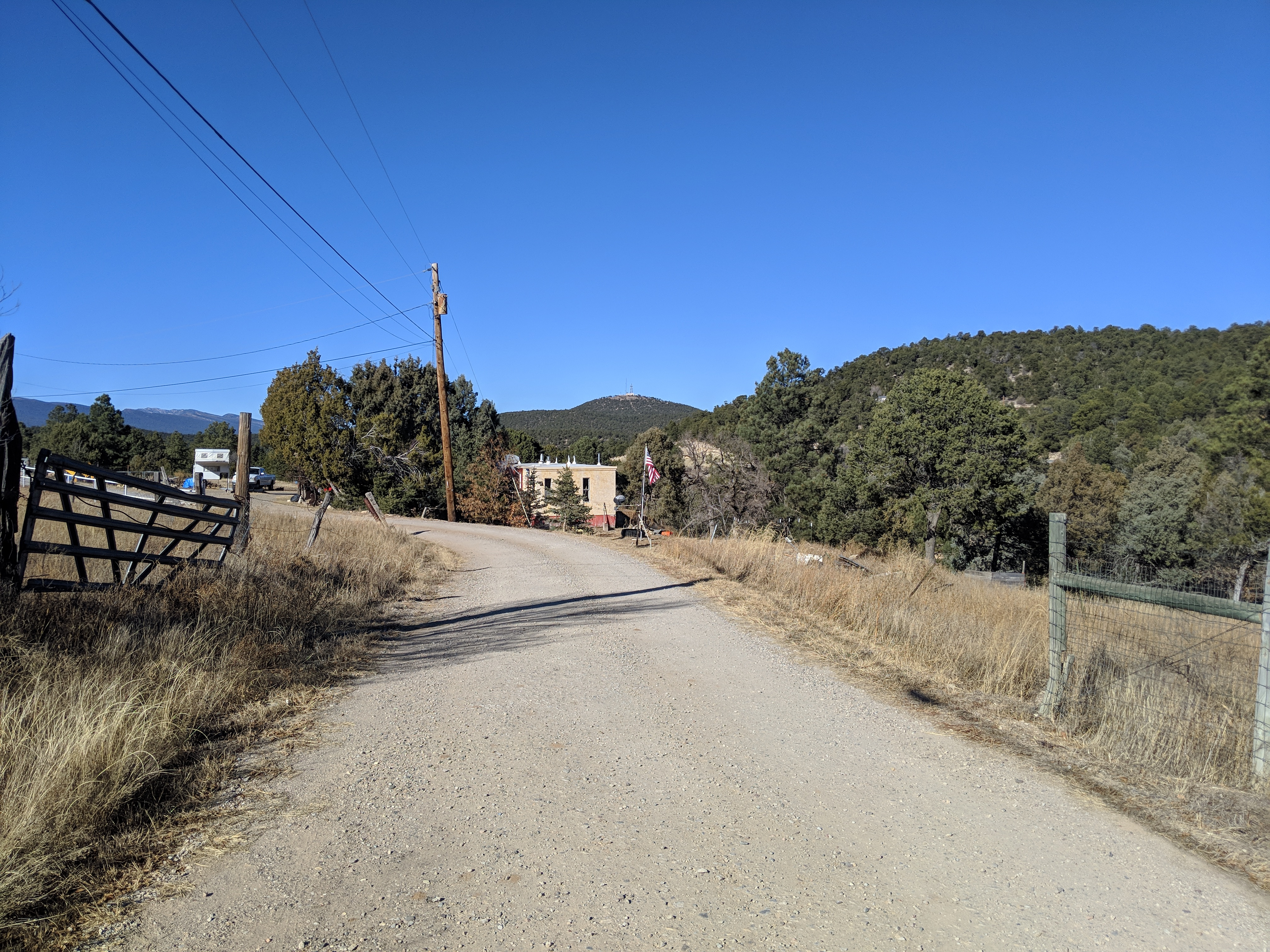
- El Cedro Lane

- Location within New Mexico
- Coordinates: 35°01′25″N 106°21′20″W
- Country: United States
- State: New Mexico
- County: Bernalillo

Area
  - Total: 5.39 sq mi (13.97 km^{2})
  - Land: 5.39 sq mi (13.97 km^{2})
  - Water: 0 sq mi (0.00 km^{2})
- Elevation: 7,241 ft (2,207 m)

Population (2020)
  - Total: 416
  - Density: 77.2/sq mi (29.79/km^{2})
- Time zone: UTC-7 (Mountain (MST))
  - Summer (DST): UTC-6 (MDT)
- Area code: 505
- FIPS code: 35-13450
- GNIS feature ID: 2584071

Cedro is a census-designated place (CDP) in Bernalillo County, New Mexico, United States. As of the 2020 census, Cedro had a population of 416. It is part of the Albuquerque Metropolitan Statistical Area.

== Geography ==
Cedro is located in eastern Bernalillo County. It is bordered to the south by the Ponderosa Pine CDP. The center of Cedro lies in Cedro Canyon in the northern end of the Manzano Mountains southeast of Albuquerque. New Mexico State Road 337 leads through the canyon and the Cedro CDP, leading north 6 miles (10 km) to Tijeras, from where it is a further 14 miles (23 km) west via Interstate 40 to downtown Albuquerque.

According to the United States Census Bureau, the Cedro CDP has a total area of 5.3 square miles (13.8 km^{2}), all land.

== Demographics ==
Historical population
Census	Pop.	Note	%±
2020	416		—
U.S. Decennial Census

== Education ==
It is zoned to Albuquerque Public Schools.
