= Ponderosa Pine, New Mexico =

- Census-designated place
- Location within New Mexico
- Coordinates: 34°58′19″N 106°20′13″W
- Country: United States
- State: New Mexico
- County: Bernalillo

Area
  - Total: 8.07 sq mi (20.91 km^{2})
  - Land: 8.07 sq mi (20.91 km^{2})
  - Water: 0.0039 sq mi (0.01 km^{2})
- Elevation: 7,513 ft (2,290 m)

Population (2020)
  - Total: 1,092
  - Density: 135.3/sq mi (52.23/km^{2})
- Time zone: UTC-7 (Mountain (MST))
  - Summer (DST): UTC-6 (MDT)
- Area code: 505
- FIPS code: 35-59120
- GNIS feature ID: 2584184

Ponderosa Pine is a census-designated place (CDP) in Bernalillo County, New Mexico, United States. As of the 2020 census, Ponderosa Pine had a population of 1,092. It is part of the Albuquerque Metropolitan Statistical Area.

== Geography ==
Ponderosa Pine is located in southeastern Bernalillo County. It is bordered to the north by the Cedro census-designated place, and to the west by Cibola National Forest. New Mexico State Road 337 leads through the community, leading north 10 miles (16 km) to Tijeras and Interstate 40.

According to the United States Census Bureau, the Ponderosa Pine CDP has a total area of 8.1 square miles (20.9 km^{2}), all land.

== Demographics ==
Historical population
Census	Pop.	Note	%±
2020	1,092		—
U.S. Decennial Census

== Education ==
It is zoned to Albuquerque Public Schools.
