= Sandia Heights, New Mexico =

- Census-designated place
- Location within New Mexico
- Coordinates: 35°10′29″N 106°29′18″W
- Country: United States
- State: New Mexico
- County: Bernalillo

Area
  - Total: 1.88 sq mi (4.88 km^{2})
  - Land: 1.88 sq mi (4.88 km^{2})
  - Water: 0 sq mi (0.00 km^{2})
- Elevation: 6,165 ft (1,879 m)

Population (2020)
  - Total: 3,273
  - Density: 1,735.4/sq mi (670.06/km^{2})
- Time zone: UTC-7 (Mountain (MST))
  - Summer (DST): UTC-6 (MDT)
- ZIP code: 87122
- Area code: 505
- FIPS code: 35-66765
- GNIS feature ID: 2584202

Sandia Heights is a census-designated place (CDP) in Bernalillo County, New Mexico, United States. As of the 2020 census, Sandia Heights had a population of 3,273. It is part of the Albuquerque Metropolitan Statistical Area.

== Geography ==
Sandia Heights is located in northern Bernalillo County at the western base of the Sandia Mountains. It is bordered to the south by the city of Albuquerque. The base station for the Sandia Peak Tramway is located just outside the northern edge of the CDP.

According to the United States Census Bureau, Sandia Heights has a total area of 1.9 square miles (5.0 km^{2}), all land.

=== Climate ===
Sandia Heights is categorized as being within the 7b USDA hardiness zone, meaning temperatures can get as low as 5 to 10 °F.

Climate data for Sandia Heights (6,180 feet above sea level)
Month	Jan	Feb	Mar	Apr	May	Jun	Jul	Aug	Sep	Oct	Nov	Dec	Year
Record high °F (°C)	67.0 (19.4)	70.0 (21.1)	79.0 (26.1)	85.0 (29.4)	96.0 (35.6)	101.0 (38.3)	100.0 (37.8)	98.0 (36.7)	93.0 (33.9)	86.0 (30.0)	75.0 (23.9)	67.0 (19.4)	101.0 (38.3)
Mean daily maximum °F (°C)	43.0 (6.1)	48.0 (8.9)	56.0 (13.3)	64.0 (17.8)	74.0 (23.3)	83.0 (28.3)	85.0 (29.4)	83.0 (28.3)	77.0 (25.0)	66.0 (18.9)	53.0 (11.7)	43.0 (6.1)	64.6 (18.1)
Daily mean °F (°C)	30.0 (−1.1)	34.5 (1.4)	41.0 (5.0)	48.0 (8.9)	57.5 (14.2)	66.0 (18.9)	69.5 (20.8)	68.5 (20.3)	61.5 (16.4)	50.5 (10.3)	39.0 (3.9)	30.0 (−1.1)	49.7 (9.8)
Mean daily minimum °F (°C)	17.0 (−8.3)	21.0 (−6.1)	26.0 (−3.3)	32.0 (0.0)	41.0 (5.0)	49.0 (9.4)	54.0 (12.2)	54.0 (12.2)	46.0 (7.8)	35.0 (1.7)	25.0 (−3.9)	17.0 (−8.3)	34.8 (1.5)
Record low °F (°C)	−30.0 (−34.4)	−27.0 (−32.8)	0.0 (−17.8)	7.0 (−13.9)	12.0 (−11.1)	28.0 (−2.2)	40.0 (4.4)	38.0 (3.3)	22.0 (−5.6)	3.0 (−16.1)	−18.0 (−27.8)	−18.0 (−27.8)	−30.0 (−34.4)
Average precipitation inches (mm)	0.49 (12)	0.35 (8.9)	0.68 (17)	0.61 (15)	0.99 (25)	1.63 (41)	2.23 (57)	2.52 (64)	1.62 (41)	1.40 (36)	0.60 (15)	0.65 (17)	13.77 (348.9)
Source: Weather Channel

== Demographics ==
Historical population
Census	Pop.	Note	%±
2020	3,273		—
U.S. Decennial Census

=== 2020 census ===
As of the 2020 census, Sandia Heights had a population of 3,273. The median age was 60.3 years. 14.2% of residents were under the age of 18 and 41.6% of residents were 65 years of age or older. For every 100 females there were 92.9 males, and for every 100 females age 18 and over there were 90.6 males age 18 and over.

100.0% of residents lived in urban areas, while 0.0% lived in rural areas.

There were 1,521 households in Sandia Heights, of which 17.7% had children under the age of 18 living in them. Of all households, 65.5% were married-couple households, 10.5% were households with a male householder and no spouse or partner present, and 20.1% were households with a female householder and no spouse or partner present. About 23.7% of all households were made up of individuals and 15.5% had someone living alone who was 65 years of age or older.

There were 1,600 housing units, of which 4.9% were vacant. The homeowner vacancy rate was 0.9% and the rental vacancy rate was 10.2%.

Racial composition as of the 2020 census
Race	Number	Percent
White	2,767	84.5%
Black or African American	22	0.7%
American Indian and Alaska Native	21	0.6%
Asian	91	2.8%
Native Hawaiian and Other Pacific Islander	0	0.0%
Some other race	31	0.9%
Two or more races	341	10.4%
Hispanic or Latino (of any race)	333	10.2%

== Education ==
It is zoned to Albuquerque Public Schools.
