= Edith Enclave, New Mexico =

- Census-designated place
- Location within New Mexico
- Coordinates: 35°12′38″N 106°35′20″W
- Country: United States
- State: New Mexico
- County: Bernalillo

Area
  - Total: 1.5 sq mi (4.0 km^{2})
  - Land: 1.5 sq mi (3.9 km^{2})
  - Water: 0.039 sq mi (0.1 km^{2})
- Elevation: 5,086 ft (1,550 m)

Population (2010)
  - Total: 211
  - Density: 140/sq mi (53.9/km^{2})
- Time zone: UTC-7 (Mountain (MST))
  - Summer (DST): UTC-6 (MDT)
- Area code: 505
- FIPS code: 35-22390
- GNIS feature ID: 2584091

Edith Enclave is a census-designated place (CDP) in Bernalillo County, New Mexico, United States. The population was 211 at the 2010 census. It is part of the Albuquerque Metropolitan Statistical Area.

== Geography ==
The CDP is located in northern Bernalillo County; it is bordered by the city of Albuquerque to the south, Interstate 25 to the east, the Sandoval County boundary to the north, and a levee along the Rio Grande to the west. The main road through the CDP is the north-south New Mexico State Road 313 (4th Street NW). New Mexico State Road 556 (Roy Avenue) leads east to I-25's Exit 234. Downtown Albuquerque is 10 miles (16 km) south of the center of the CDP.

According to the United States Census Bureau, the CDP has a total area of 1.5 square miles (4.0 km^{2}), of which 1.5 square miles (3.9 km^{2}) is land and 0.04 square miles (0.1 km^{2}), or 2.99%, is water.

== Demographics ==
Historical population
Census	Pop.	Note	%±
2010	211		—
2020	200		−5.2%
U.S. Decennial Census

The community first appeared as a census designated place under the name Edith Endave in the 2010 U.S. census. The name was corrected to Edith Enclave by the United States Census Bureau in the 2022 American Community Survey.

Edith Enclave CDP, New Mexico – Racial and ethnic composition Note: the US Census treats Hispanic/Latino as an ethnic category. This table excludes Latinos from the racial categories and assigns them to a separate category. Hispanics/Latinos may be of any race.
Race / Ethnicity (NH = Non-Hispanic)	Pop 2010	Pop 2020	% 2010	% 2020
White alone (NH)	87	74	41.23%	37.00%
Black or African American alone (NH)	3	2	1.42%	1.00%
Native American or Alaska Native alone (NH)	25	18	11.85%	9.00%
Asian alone (NH)	1	2	0.47%	1.00%
Pacific Islander alone (NH)	0	1	0.00%	0.50%
Other race alone (NH)	0	2	0.00%	1.00%
Mixed race or Multiracial (NH)	3	6	1.42%	3.00%
Hispanic or Latino (any race)	92	95	43.60%	47.50%
Total	211	200	100.00%	100.00%

== Education ==
It is zoned to Albuquerque Public Schools.
