= Albuquerque Rapid Transit =

Bus rapid transit service in Albuquerque, New Mexico, USA

Coordinates: 35°4′51.7″N 106°37′12″W

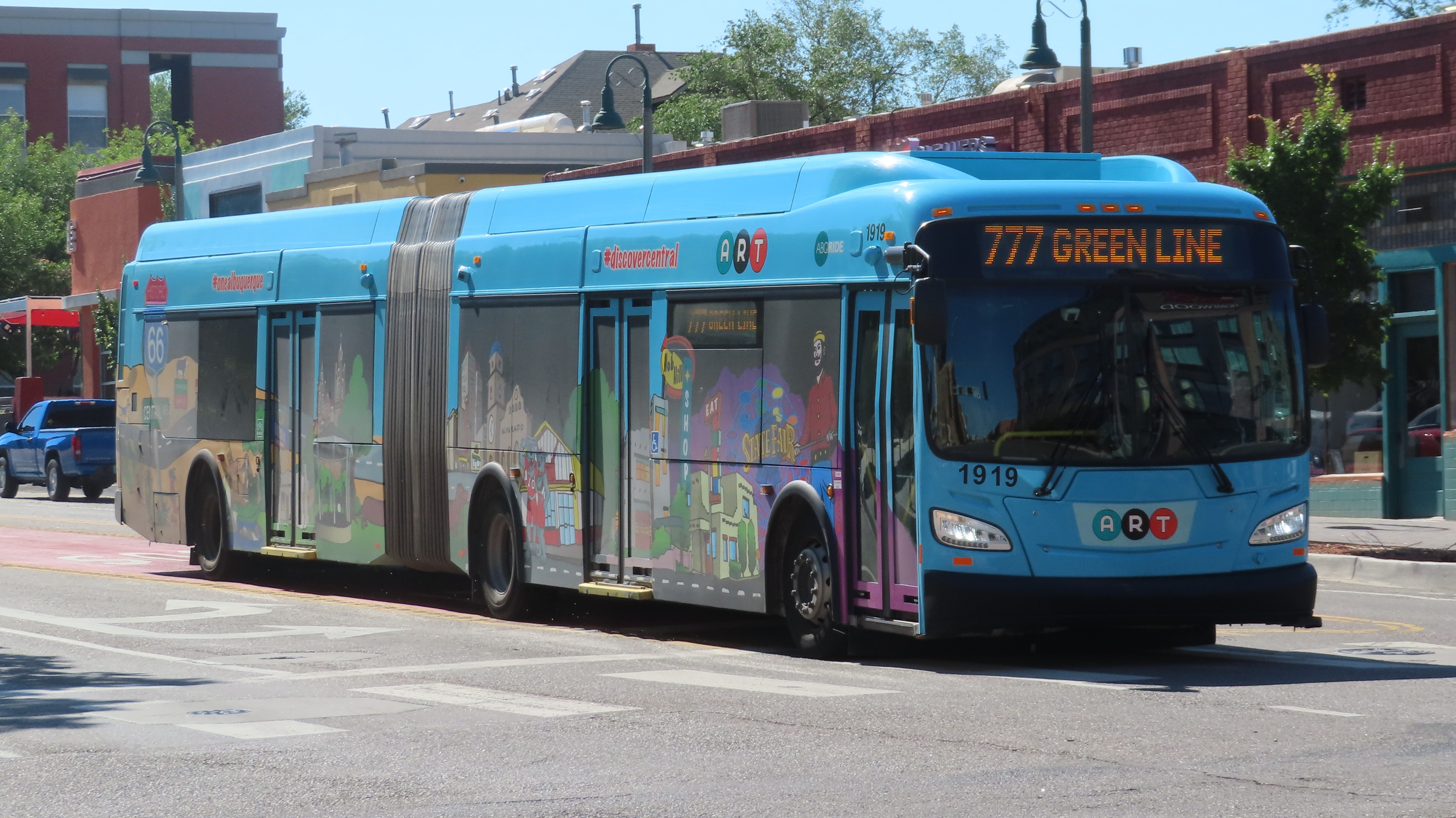
- A New Flyer Xcelsior XD60 on Route 777 in Downtown

Overview
- System: ABQ RIDE
- Operator: ABQ RIDE
- Garage: Westside/Daytona
- Vehicle: New Flyer XD60
- Began service: November 30, 2019

Route
- Locale: Albuquerque, New Mexico
- Start: Central and Unser Transit Center
- End: Route 777 - Tramway Boulevard (NM 556); Route 766 - Uptown Transit Center
- Length: 13.8 miles (22.2 km) Route 777; 12 miles (19 km) Route 766
- Stations: 19

Service
- Ridership: 2,315,206 (2024)

Albuquerque Rapid Transit (ART) is a bus rapid transit (BRT) system serving the Central Avenue corridor in Albuquerque, New Mexico, United States. There are two lines running between Tramway Boulevard (NM 556), the Central and Unser Transit Center (CUTC), and the Uptown Transit Center (UTC).

It was built in 2016–17 and began limited operation in November 2017, but was subsequently delayed for over two years due to problems with the stations and buses. After the original fleet of electric buses was replaced with diesel buses, the line began regular service on November 30, 2019. ART carried more than 2 million passengers in 2023.

== History ==
=== Background ===
In 2004, the city of Albuquerque began operations of its first Rapid Ride bus line, as a precursor to a light rail system along Central Avenue. The plans for light rail were scrapped, and the Rapid Ride became a permanent system, expanding to three different lines in 2006 and 2009. Studies to build a rapid transit system using either buses or streetcars also took place in 2006, but no action was taken. Although the Rapid Ride is a limited-stop express bus service, it lacks several key features of BRT, such as dedicated travel lanes (guideways) and off-bus fare payment. The first line opened, and ran from Unser to Wyoming, then going to the Uptown Transit Center. A second Rapid Ride opened in 2006 to the northwest side, and the Rapid Rides were given color designations, becoming the 766 Red Line and the 790 Blue Line. In 2009, the third Rapid Ride, the 777 Green Line, started service from downtown to Tramway Boulevard. The Red and Green Line Rapid Rides were designed to supplement the heavily traveled 66 bus, which travels from Tramway Boulevard to Unser Boulevard, as well as transport passengers to popular destinations.

In 2011, during the administration of Mayor Richard J. Berry, the city of Albuquerque began a feasibility study of creating a true BRT system along Central Avenue. The plan called for the elimination of the current Rapid Ride routes and the placement of a new system utilizing new buses, guideways, transit signal priority, and off-board fare collection. Central Avenue, also known as Historic US Route 66, is not only a popular tourist destination, but a major surface artery through Albuquerque. This street made the plans for starting a transit-oriented development scheme a good starting point.

In February 2014, the city filed for federal funding to construct the proposed BRT system, and the federal government approved the filing in March. Later that month, the city presented a demonstration bus to the public to generate interest in the project. In October, the city presented its final draft and alternative analysis to the public in a series of meetings. The design at the time called for both mixed-use lanes and dedicated guideways, depending on the location. Except for a few stations near downtown, stations would board in the median, and the buses would have doors on both sides to accommodate the platforms. East of Louisiana Boulevard and west of Coors Boulevard, ART would share travel lanes and use existing Rapid Ride stops. The path would follow the existing 66 bus route to Unser Boulevard.

ART (red, green) and Rapid Ride (blue) routes (2021)

The proposed route changed somewhat during the planning phase. Early materials depicted ART making a stop at the Unser Transit Center (CUTC) before continuing to 98th St., but the CUTC serves as the western terminus of the system as built. ART was expected to cost $119 million, with federal funds covering $100.6 million (about 84%) of the project. The city also promised to consider a 20th stop within the International District, but did not announce then where that stop would be put or how it would be paid for. In April 2017, it was decided that the 20th stop in the International District would be located at San Pedro and Central, with funding provided by the city councilor of that district.

There were plans to create other BRT systems throughout the Albuquerque metro, put forward by various organizations such as ABQ RIDE and the Mid-Region Council of Governments (MRCOG). Studies conducted included an intersecting BRT system on University Boulevard from Menaul Boulevard to the airport, and another BRT system on Paseo del Norte.

ART received a recommendation for $69 million in federal funding as part of the proposed FY 17 budget and anticipated the start of construction in May 2016 pending FTA approval to spend local funds.

=== Construction ===
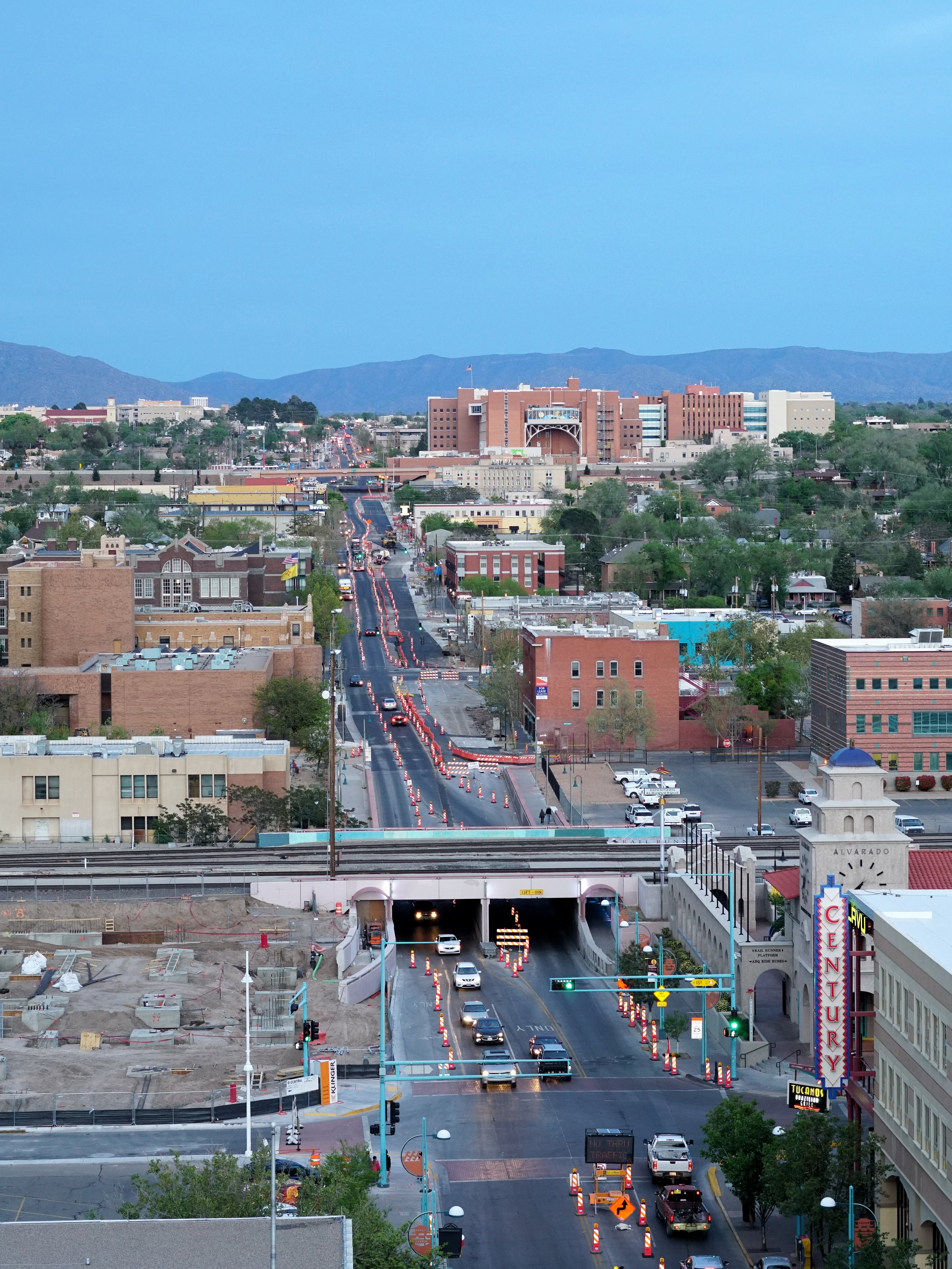
View east along Central Ave (Route 66) during construction of ART in 2017, showing temporary barriers; Alvarado Transportation Center is visible on the right edge of the photograph, and the New Mexico Rail Runner Express line crosses Central in the foreground.

Opponents of the ART project filed suit in April 2016 to stop construction from going forward, but both the U.S. District Court and Tenth Circuit Court of Appeals refused to grant a temporary injunction against the project, allowing the city to proceed while the case was pending. In September 2016, local contractor Bradbury Stamm was awarded an $82.6 million contract to build the ART system. Construction was scheduled to last 16 months, with a completion date near the end of 2017. Work began in October 2016, starting with the removal of medians and landscaping to make room for the new bus guideway. In December, the Court of Appeals ruled in favor of the city, finding no legal grounds to stop the project. The suit against the city was subsequently dropped, ending a nearly year-long legal battle.

During construction, businesses near the ART route complained that the project was impacting their business, and some were forced to close or cut back on staff. Opposition was expressed from residents along the route who instead were expecting the originally planned light rail service. In April 2017, the city announced a short-term loan program aimed at helping small businesses survive the construction.

=== Initial launch and problems ===
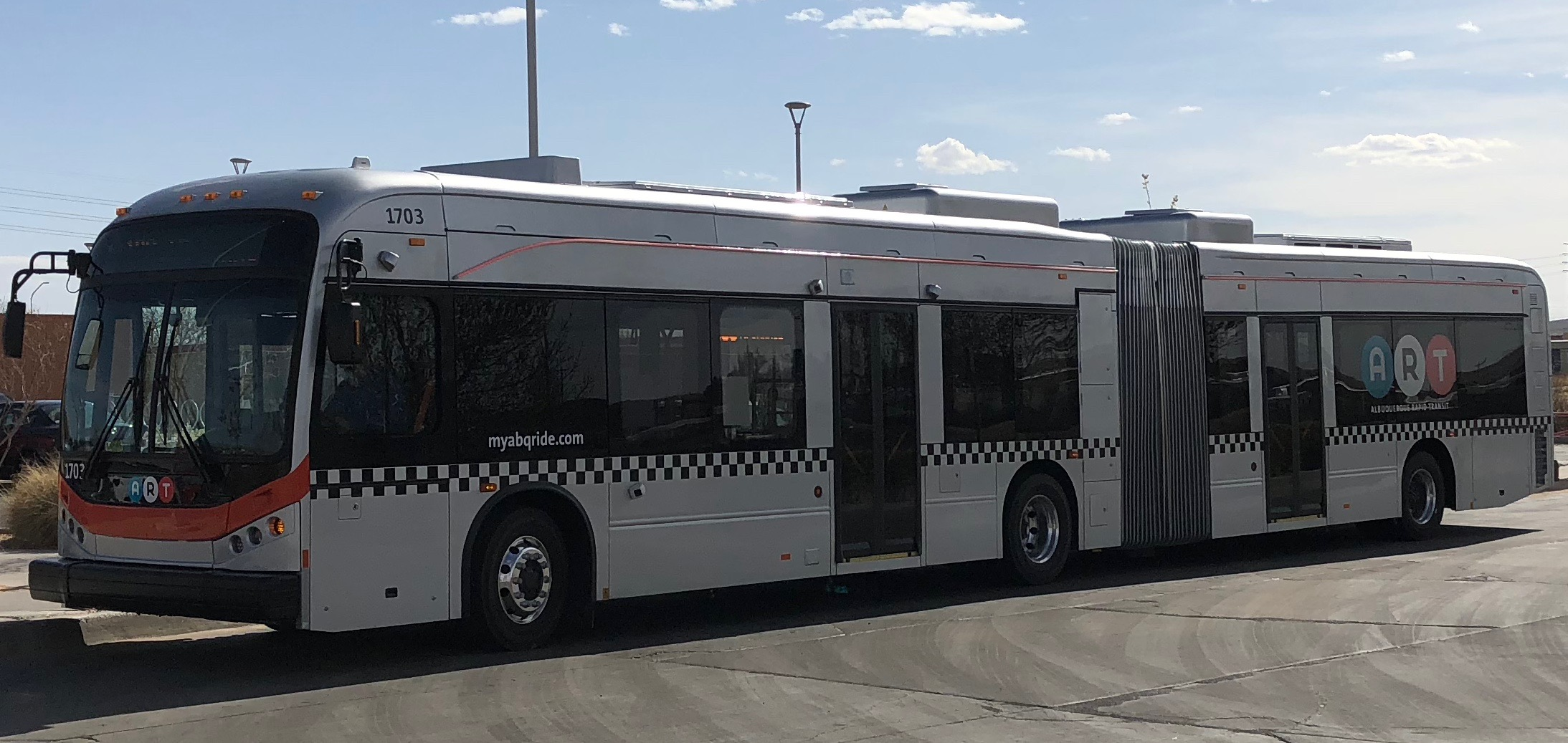
One of the rejected BYD K11 60-foot battery electric articulated buses

ART went into limited service on November 25, 2017, providing free trips to and from the Albuquerque BioPark for the River of Lights event. However, full service was delayed, and incoming Mayor Tim Keller began to allude to problems with the system after he took office in December. On January 9, 2018, he held a press conference where he called ART "a bit of a lemon," and said he was not sure when it would be operational. According to Keller, the problems included inconsistent platform heights, ADA violations, and at least one intersection whose geometry was unable to accommodate a 60-foot articulated bus safely. Bradbury Stamm said it would work to fix the issues at no additional cost to the city. In January 2018, crews began work to resolve some of the issues with the ART stations.

Keller also described issues with the BYD K11 electric buses and charging equipment supplied by BYD, including faulty batteries and leaking axles on the buses, and inoperable chargers. The River of Lights service was suspended after Keller's administration learned that a stopgap solution of charging the buses using portable generators could potentially void the warranty. The range, advertised as 275 miles (443 km), only proved to be 200 miles (320 km). BYD also said it would fix the identified issues at no additional cost.

An investigation by the city Office of Inspector General identified various issues with the buses, and reported that city inspectors sent to BYD to check the buses were not properly trained. It was further reported that the first ART bus had been cobbled together from "parts and pieces" intended for a different transit agency, Antelope Valley Transit Authority (AVTA) in California, in response to pressure from city officials to deliver the bus before the end of Berry's term. BYD struggled to fill the bus order by the original October 4, 2017, deadline, and had only delivered 15 of the 20 buses by November 2018, when the city decided to reject the buses. The City of Albuquerque filed suit against BYD in December, alleging that "BYD had failed to meet the scheduled deadline for providing the 60-foot articulated buses and that the vehicles it ultimately delivered were unsafe, had defects such as cracked frames and improperly installed wiring, and did not meet the represented miles-per-charge standard." BYD counter-sued and ultimately the two sides settled with no additional money changing hands. Twenty diesel-powered New Flyer Xcelsior XD60 buses were purchased as a replacement for the BYD order; the first was delivered in June 2019.

The vandalism of dormant stations, the increased traffic on the remaining traffic lanes, and the cancellation of the anticipated light-rail system led to criticism of the project by Albuquerque politicians and business owners. Some businesses along the route reported a decrease in sales, with customers avoiding the heavy traffic.

=== Regular service ===
On November 8, 2019, Mayor Keller announced that ART service would begin on November 30, 2019, to coincide with "Small Business Saturday." Buses were unveiled displaying bus wraps featuring local landmarks and artwork. The Mayor stated that the previously identified issues to the system have been remedied and went on to announce that rides on the ART System would be free through December 31, 2019, to encourage the public to try the new system. On January 1, 2022, the city eliminated bus fares system-wide, rendering the pay kiosks obsolete.

By February 2020, ART saw large ridership increases over the previous year's numbers on the Rapid Ride routes it replaced. The first month of ART service, which was offered for free to the public, saw ridership more than double over the same period in 2019, while the first month of paid service saw ridership increase by more than 30% over the same period in 2019. On April 18, 2023, fares were permanently eliminated for ART.

In February 2023, ABQ RIDE released their draft plans for the ABQ Ride Forward bus network redesign. One plan prioritized coverage while the other prioritized frequency. In both the Coverage Network and Ridership Network plans, the 766 would run every 15 minutes on weekdays, 20 minutes on Saturdays and 30 minutes on Sundays, with an extension past Central & Unser Transit Center to South Valley Plaza via 98th Street, replacing route 198, which would be discontinued. Alternate 766 trips would run via Unser Boulevard between Central & Unser Transit Center and South Valley Plaza. The 777 would run at the same frequency as 766 and would run local east of Louisiana Boulevard to replace route 66, which would be discontinued. In May 2024, ABQ Ride released a new network plan which combined aspects of both draft networks. In the Recovery Network plan, the 766 and 777 would retain the same frequencies as proposed in the draft plans. The 766 would no longer have alternate trips running along Unser Boulevard, with these alternate trips instead terminating at Central & Unser Transit Center.The 777 would have alternate trips run north on Coors Boulevard to Northwest Transit Center to replace the 155 and 790, which would both be discontinued, and would continue running local east of Louisiana Boulevard to replace the 66, which would instead be rerouted off of Central Avenue east of San Pedro Avenue The Recovery Network was made official in June 2025, with the changes to the ART planned to be implemented starting in early 2027.

== Design ==
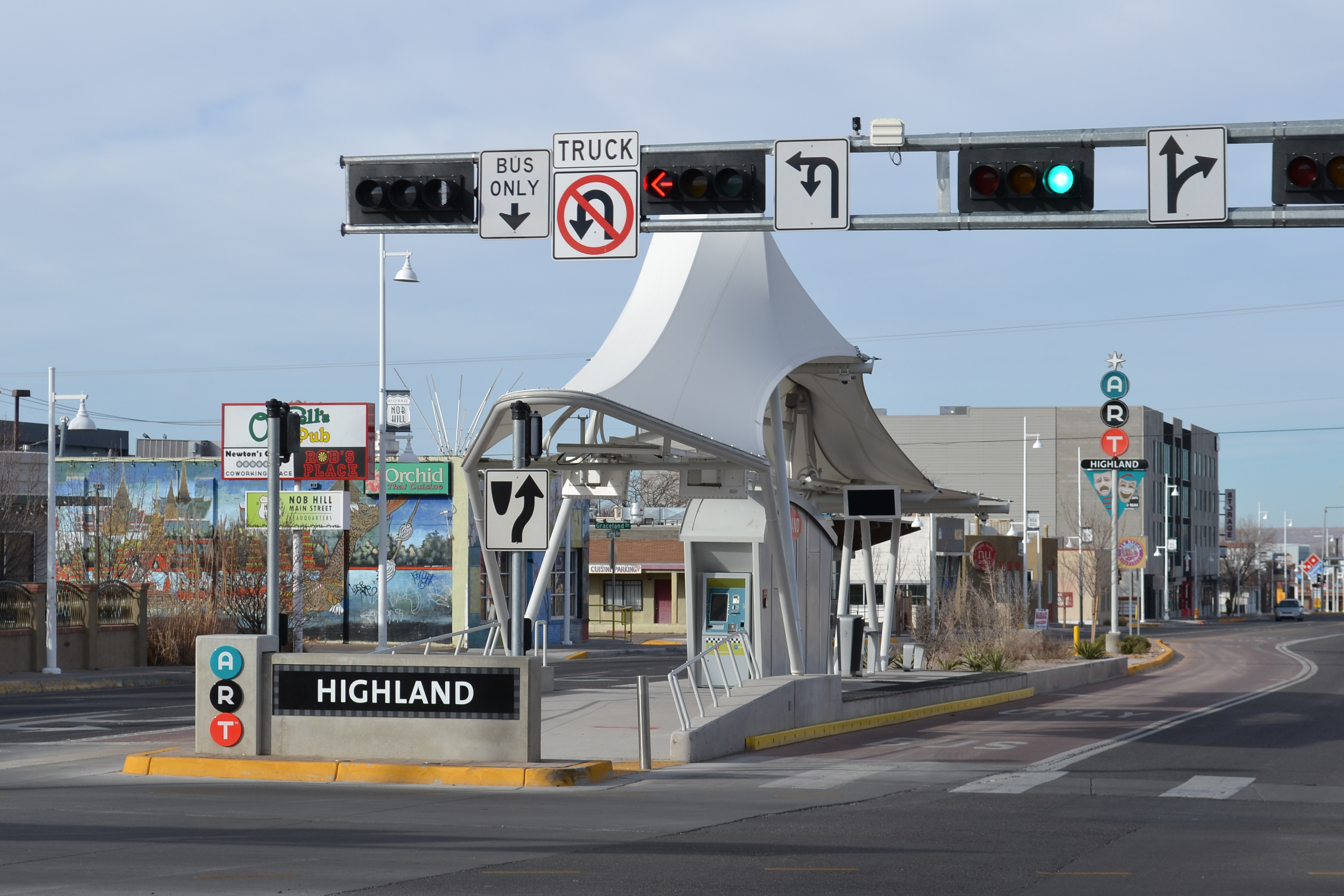
The Highland ART station in 2018, prior to the system being operational

Buses used on the ART line bear similarities in design and operation to light rail trains. ART buses have doors on both sides to accommodate different platform locations. The guideway includes several variations on bus priority lanes, including dedicated guideways, bidirectional lanes, and reversible lanes.

ART stations often feature passenger amenities such as shelters, benches, lighting, new landscaping, and potentially, local art work. On a standard bus route, passengers have to climb steps or a wheelchair ramp must be folded out to board the bus. ART stations are similar to train platforms in providing level boarding: when a bus arrives, the floor of bus is the same height as the station platform. This reduces the time to board and deboard passengers and makes the buses more accessible for wheelchair users.

Some platforms, however, were found to have inconsistent platform heights as well as gaps between platform and buses, potentially creating significant accessibility issues. Also, the stations' clearance was incompatible with the buses supplied by BYD, as evidenced by bus mirrors hitting the station structure.

=== Rolling stock ===
To gauge interest in a BRT line, a "train-like" New Flyer Xcelsior XN60 ordered by RTC Transit was exhibited in Albuquerque in March 2014.

The City of Albuquerque initially ordered 18 battery electric BYD K11s for the ART line, at a cost of $22,921,137. At the time, the K11 had not undergone federally mandated endurance testing, and Albuquerque was not required to pay for the buses until one had passed the tests and all buses were modified to match the successfully tested bus. The K11 is a 60-foot (nominal length) articulated bus with five doors: three on the curb-side of the bus, and two on the street-side (driver's side) of the bus. The street-side doors are in the middle and rear parts of the bus, aft of the forward axle. The contract was later amended to increase the number of buses purchased to 20, but BYD was unable to deliver all 20 before the original deadline of October 4, 2017.

The first BYD K11 was delivered to Albuquerque in October 2017 and the city's transit operator subsequently identified "serious durability and safety issues", including door, frame, brake, and operating range issues. A subsequent study concluded that even had the buses met their contractual range, the planned overnight depot charging would not be sufficient for a full day of operation, and on-route charging or schedule changes would have been required. For Indianapolis, which similarly had ordered K11 buses for its IndyGo Red Line BRT service, BYD agreed to install on-route chargers at no extra cost. Other operators of BYD battery electric buses have determined their range is dependent on ambient temperatures due to their unique battery chemistry. In November 2018, the city rejected the 15 K11 buses that had been delivered. Ten of the K11 buses ordered by Albuquerque were delivered to AVTA in California instead.

As a replacement, Albuquerque ordered 10 New Flyer Xcelsior XD60 clean-diesel, five-door articulated buses for ART service in December 2018, and added 10 more by exercising an option. The first XD60 bus was delivered in June 2019. With Albuquerque executing another option for 10 more XD60 buses in December 2019, there would be 30 XD60 buses in the ART fleet once deliveries were complete.

== Accolades ==
Shortly after construction began, the Institute for Transportation and Development Policy (ITDP), which, under its BRT Standard, ranks BRT corridors based on design, efficiency, and operation, awarded the ART corridor a Gold ranking for design, scoring 88.5 out of 100 possible points for its extensive use of BRT technology, such as dedicated bus guideways, off-board fare collection, bus-level boarding platforms, frequency of service, and the use of an all-electric bus fleet. ART is the first BRT system in the United States to receive a Gold rating from the ITDP. Because the gold designation was awarded strictly for design, the corridor was scheduled to be reassessed approximately six months after ART became operational.

In December 2017, the National Association of Industrial and Office Properties (NAIOP) jointly awarded their annual "Chairman's Award" to the ART project and to former mayor Richard J. Berry, stating in the award announcement, "Berry’s strong advocacy of the project was also seen as pivotal to its implementation."

== Incidents ==
On November 25, 2017, the opening day for limited service on the route, a passenger vehicle attempted to make an illegal U-turn across the guideway to escape a long traffic queue due to the annual River of Lights festival, and was struck by an ART vehicle traveling westbound in the guideway. There were no injuries reported, and the driver of the passenger vehicle admitted fault at the scene.

To prevent collisions at Central and San Pasquale from westbound Central traffic (which continues west after a right-hand turn) and both westbound ART vehicles turning into this mixed-use lane, and eastbound traffic turning left into San Pasquale, this intersection is signed as a "No Right Turn On Red" intersection. Some motorists ignore the signage, leading to crashes at this intersection. To further reduce crashes, two LED signs were installed above the original no-turn sign in March 2021. Since opening, the city keeps video surveillance records of various incidents involving ART vehicles or stations, many of which have been uploaded to the internet.

To help reduce the number of incidents and discourage mixed traffic from entering the guideway, pinned curbs were added throughout most of the corridor. In addition, the bidirectional bus guideway that runs on Central Avenue near UNM was painted red to help avoid confusion from both motorists and pedestrians attempting to cross Central. As buses come from both directions on this stretch of the guideway, it was hoped that the red coloring would help alert drivers and pedestrians to ART vehicles in the guideway.
