= La Mesa Motel =

- U.S. National Register of Historic Places
- NM State Register of Cultural Properties
- Location within New Mexico Location within the United States
- Location: 7407 Central Ave. SW, Albuquerque, New Mexico
- Coordinates: 35°4′32″N 106°33′51″W
- Built: 1938
- Architectural style: Pueblo Revival
- NRHP reference No.: 93001220
- NMSRCP No.: 1569

Significant dates
- Added to NRHP: November 22, 1993
- Designated NMSRCP: September 17, 1993

The La Mesa Motel was a historic motel on Central Avenue (former U.S. Route 66) in Albuquerque, New Mexico, which was notable as one of the best-preserved prewar Route 66 motels remaining in the city. It was built in 1938 and was added to the New Mexico State Register of Cultural Properties and the National Register of Historic Places in 1993. The building was demolished in March, 2003, and replaced with a larger two-story motel.

The motel was a linear, one-story building with 14 rooms. All of the rooms except the northernmost unit faced east toward the parking lot, while the final unit extended east from the main block and faced south. The design featured modest Pueblo Revival elements, including vigas, slightly curved parapets, small porches supported by corbeled wooden posts, and a battered chimney. The office and manager's residence were at the front of the building; the office was probably a later addition.

== See also ==
- List of motels
