= Tewa Lodge =

- U.S. National Register of Historic Places
- NM State Register of Cultural Properties
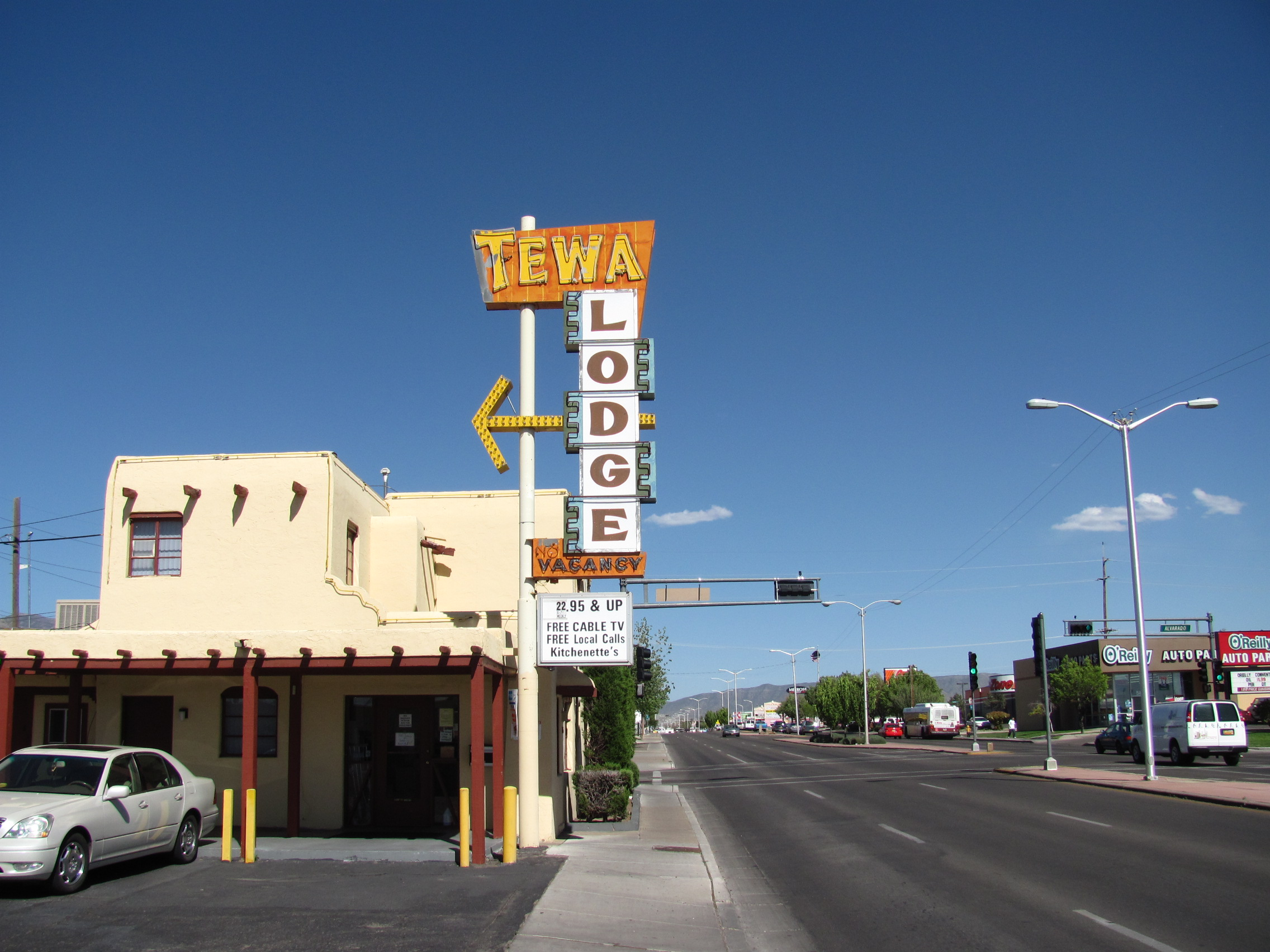
- The motel in 2010

- Location within New Mexico Location within the United States
- Location: 5715 Central Ave. NE, Albuquerque, New Mexico
- Coordinates: 35.07763°N 106.582174°W
- Built: 1946
- Architectural style: Pueblo Revival
- NRHP reference No.: 98000599
- NMSRCP No.: 1695

Significant dates
- Added to NRHP: June 11, 1998
- Designated NMSRCP: April 3, 1998

The Tewa Lodge is a historic motel on Central Avenue (former U.S. Route 66) in Albuquerque, New Mexico. It is notable as one of the best-preserved Route 66 era motels remaining in the city, and one of the few still operating as a motel. It was built in 1946 and was added to the New Mexico State Register of Cultural Properties and the National Register of Historic Places in 1998.

The motel consists of two buildings separated by a parking lot. The western building is one story and contains a single row of rooms opening onto the interior parking area. The eastern building has two rows of rooms back-to-back, with parking on either side, and has a two-story section at the front containing the office on the ground floor and manager's residence above. The building exemplifies Pueblo Revival architecture, with battered and buttressed stuccoed walls simulating adobe, flat roofs, and faux vigas. The motel has mostly original metal casement windows set in arched openings with wooden lintels. The design originally incorporated covered parking spaces between each pair of rooms, but these were later filled in to create additional rooms.

After an officer-involved shooting at the lodge killed 1 person during a "code enforcement operation," the City of Albuquerque decided to close the motel in October 2024, stating that it had become a "magnet for crime."
