= ABQ RIDE =

Transit agency of Albuquerque, New Mexico

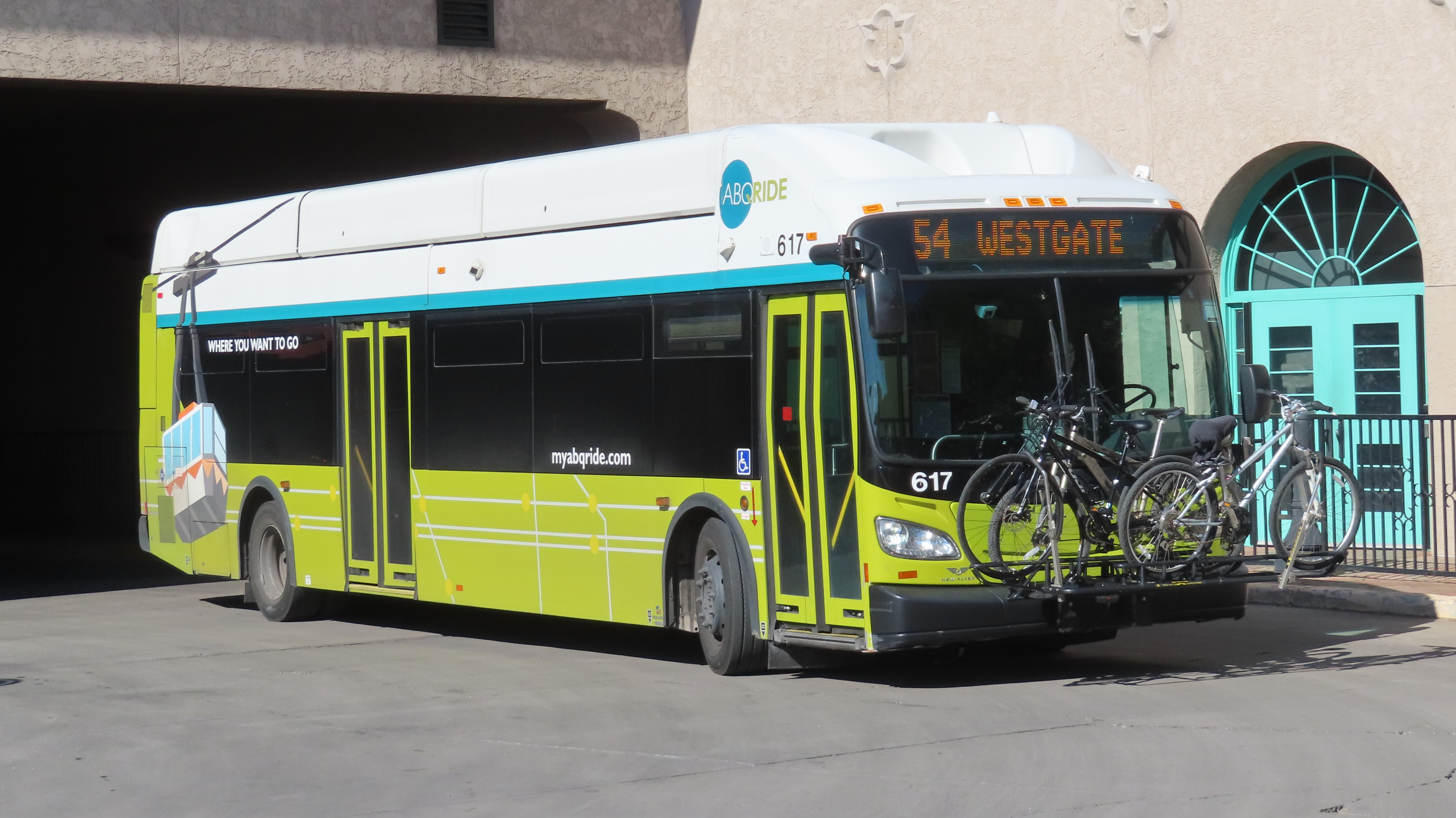
- Founded: 1928
- Headquarters: Albuquerque, New Mexico
- Service area: Albuquerque, Bernalillo County, and southeastern Sandoval County, New Mexico
- Service type: Public transportation
- Routes: 40
- Hubs: Alvarado Transportation Center; Uptown Transit Center; Northwest Transit Center; Central and Unser Transit Center
- Fleet: 156
- Daily ridership: 25,800 (weekdays, Q2 2026)
- Annual ridership: 7,729,900 (2025)
- Fuel type: Gasoline, CNG, Diesel-electric hybrid
- Operator: City of Albuquerque
- Chief executive: Leslie Keener
- Website: cabq.gov/transit

ABQ RIDE, formerly known as the City of Albuquerque Transit Department, is the local transit agency serving Albuquerque, New Mexico. ABQ RIDE operates a variety of city bus routes including two Albuquerque Rapid Transit (ART) bus rapid transit lines. It is the largest public transportation system in the state, serving 7,729,900 passengers in 2025, or about 25,800 per weekday as of the second quarter of 2026.

The name "ABQ RIDE" and a new logo depicting the Alvarado Transportation Center clock tower were chosen in a contest, replacing the previous name SunTran in September 2004. The current ABQ RIDE color scheme is yellow-green, white, and turquoise, though most of the existing fleet wears the previous maroon, white, and gold livery.

== History ==
What is now ABQ RIDE began in 1928 as the Albuquerque Bus Company. Before this, transit in the city was provided by an electric streetcar system, but it was forced out of business by declining ridership and expensive paving bills charged by the city government. City leader Clyde Tingley was a strong opponent of the streetcar system and led the effort to have it replaced with buses. The streetcar stopped running at midnight on December 31, 1927, and the bus company began operation the next morning. The company started with five White Motor Company buses and had four routes: Central Avenue, Fourth Street, Sawmill-Edith Street, and East Silver Avenue. ABQ RIDE still owns one of the original buses and uses it for special occasions.

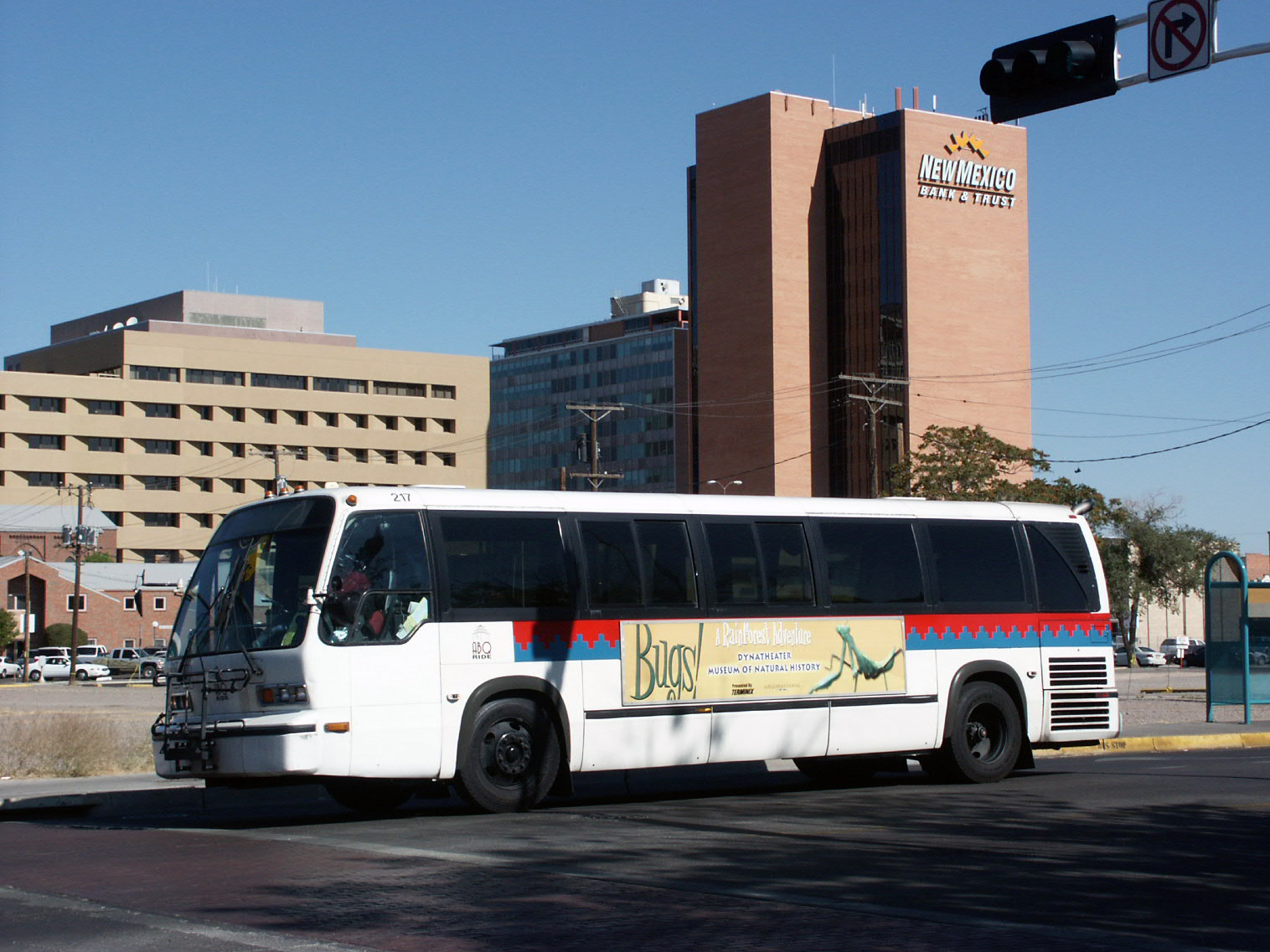
ABQ RIDE TMC Rapid Transit Series bus, in service from 1989 to 2008

By 1944, the company had 32 buses, 65 employees, and 37 miles (60 km) of routes. Nine years later, in 1953, the route network had grown to 167 miles (269 km) and there were 51 buses and 120 employees. But the company was not able to maintain profitability as private car ownership increased in the 1950s and 1960s, and in 1963, the Albuquerque Bus Company notified the city it planned to cease operation within a few months. In order to maintain service for bus riders, the city ultimately bought out the assets of the bus company and turned it into the city Transit Department. The official handover took place on February 1, 1965, with the city retaining all existing routes and equipment and most of the personnel.

The bus system operated under the name Albuquerque Transit System, and then Sun Tran starting in the 1970s. It adopted the current name, ABQ RIDE, in 2004, the same year the first Rapid Ride route began operating. In 2019, two of the three Rapid Ride routes were replaced with the Albuquerque Rapid Transit (ART) bus rapid transit system. The remaining Rapid Ride route was rebranded as ARTx in 2020.

In January 2022, ABQ RIDE launched a pilot program, eliminating fares on all of the agency's transit services for the year. The program, supported by a federal grant, was later extended to June 2023, and later September 2023. On November 9, 2023, fares were permanently eliminated on all ABQ Ride services.

In August 2022, ABQ RIDE launched their ABQ Ride Forward initiative to plan for future growth and projects. Two draft plan concepts were presented in 2023: one which prioritized frequency; and one which prioritized coverage. In May 2024, both draft networks were replaced by a Recovery Network, which combined concepts of both the Ridership and Coverage draft networks. A few changes were made to the Recovery Network before being made official in June 2025, with plans to implement the network in phases between 2025 and 2029.

== Service ==
ABQ RIDE logo currently in use on older buses

ABQ RIDE operates 20 regular fixed routes, 2 commuter routes, 2 bus rapid transit routes. The regular fixed routes operate on most of the city's major streets, while the commuter routes travel directly to Downtown Albuquerque. Many routes terminate at the Alvarado Transportation Center downtown, where riders can connect to the New Mexico Rail Runner Express and other intercity modes of transportation. ABQ RIDE also operates the Rapid Ride and Albuquerque Rapid Transit (ART) services, which are limited-stop bus routes.

ABQ RIDE fixed bus service operates four types of routes: Rapid Ride, regular, commuter, and BRT. Service times on each route may vary from every 15 minutes to every hour, but the system generally runs from 5:30 am until 6 pm, with some routes running later. A notable exception is route #66 which runs from 5:30 am until 12:30 am weekdays and Saturdays. Commuter routes only have a few run times during weekdays, usually towards Downtown Albuquerque or Kirtland AFB during the mornings and away from during the evenings. D-Ride service ended on May 12, 2018, and was replaced by various local routes, such as 12th Street/Rio Grande (routes #36 and #37) and Menaul (route #8). All inbound routes to the Alvarado Transportation Center, except route #66 and Rapid Ride routes, have a fare-free zone.

Routes 155, 222, 251, and 790 are either partially or fully funded by the Mid-Region Council of Governments (MRCOG), and either service areas outside of Albuquerque's city limits, create connections to its Rail Runner Express stations, or supplement service on the expanding west side. Routes 10, 52, 53, and 54 are either partially or fully funded by Bernalillo County, since these routes largely serve the county's unincorporated areas.

In addition to its fixed route services, ABQ RIDE also operates a paratransit service called SunVan (known as Mini Ride from 2003 to 2006) that runs curb-to-curb service.

== Fares ==
On November 9, 2023, fares were permanently eliminated on all ABQ Ride services.

== Fleet ==
=== Current fleet ===
Numbers	Year	Model	Image	Length	Fuel type
701–746; 748–758	2007	New Flyer; DE40LFR		40 feet (12 m)	
950–983	2009	New Flyer; DE40LFR		40 feet (12 m)	
601–621	2014	New Flyer; XN40		40 feet (12 m)	CNG
622-641	2016	New Flyer; XN40		40 feet (12 m)	CNG
1901–1920	2019	New Flyer; XD60		60 feet (18 m)	Diesel
1921-1930	2020	New Flyer; XD60		60 feet (18 m)	Diesel
4101-4105	2021	Proterra; ZX5		35 feet (11 m)	
351-385	2024	Gillig; Low Floor		40 feet (12 m)	CNG

ABQ RIDE uses a fleet of accessible low-floor buses that are also equipped with automated voice announcements and signs. All buses feature LED destination signs; some are able to display multiple colors and are used for Rapid Ride routes.

On February 7, 2014, ABQ RIDE placed an order for 21 New Flyer Xcelsior buses powered by compressed natural gas. The 600-series buses purchased in 2015 (622–641) all have open WiFi networks available for public use. In addition, they have a screen installed behind the driver that displays the current security camera feed from the camera looking down the aisle from the front of the bus.

=== Other vehicles ===
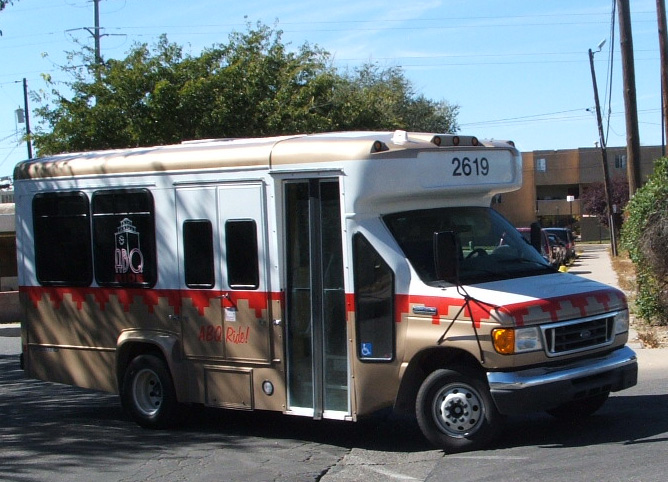
One of ABQ RIDE's paratransit vehicles.

In addition, the fleet comprises numerous smaller vehicles like the SunVan paratransit vans, and formerly, the Old Town trolley. CNG buses (300- and 600-series buses) and the 900-series buses operate out of the Yale Transit Department on 601 Yale Boulevard SE, while the 700-series buses, Rapid Ride buses (6400-series, 6600-series, and 6900-series), and the paratransit fleet operate out of the Daytona Transit Facility on Daytona Road near Unser Boulevard and I-40. Daytona operates seven days a week except on city-observed holidays. Yale operates on weekdays only. On May 1, 2015, the 900-series buses were moved temporarily to Daytona due to renovations at Yale; however, they went back to operating out of the Yale facility beginning October 19, 2015. The Yale Transit Department is now equipped with unleaded fuel to fuel shuttle cars.

== Plans ==
=== Bus rapid transit service along Central ===
In November 2011, ABQ RIDE announced plans for true bus rapid transit service along Central Avenue. The service differs from the Rapid Ride based on the fact that it would be considered a true BRT service based on adding more aspects of BRT service such as a dedicated travel lane or queue jumps, platforms level with the bus floor, and off-board ticketing so that passengers can load at any door.

On March 24, 2014, ABQ RIDE demonstrated a New Flyer XN60, which was built for RTC in Las Vegas, Nevada, and was en route for delivery. This type of bus is one of the designs being explored for BRT service, and is the longer 60 foot version of the current XN40 buses being delivered to ABQ RIDE.

On May 15, 2014, ABQ RIDE introduced a new logo and paint scheme for the organization.

In October 2014, the City of Albuquerque unveiled conceptual designs for construction of Albuquerque Rapid Transit, a true BRT system including dedicated lanes, traffic signal priority, level boarding, and off-bus fare payment. Public input from meetings will allow engineering of the BRT system and redesign of the roads it will travel on.

Following delays from equipment problems, BRT service started in November 2019.

=== Uptown Transit Center ===
In October 2014, ABQ Ride also revealed plans for a transit-oriented development (TOD) on the site of the Uptown Transit Center. The land for the transit center was originally purchased with a grant from the FTA with the intent of someday building a TOD on the site. The plans call for a parking garage above the island where buses stop and will continue to stop, a building with retail on the ground floor and several levels of living units above that, and the possibility of a multi-generational center above the parking garage. These plans were created with the help of a public meeting earlier in 2014. ABQ Ride intends, with FTA approval, to enter into a partnership with a private developer for the actual construction and operation of the building.
