= Bernalillo County, New Mexico =

County in New Mexico, United States

- County
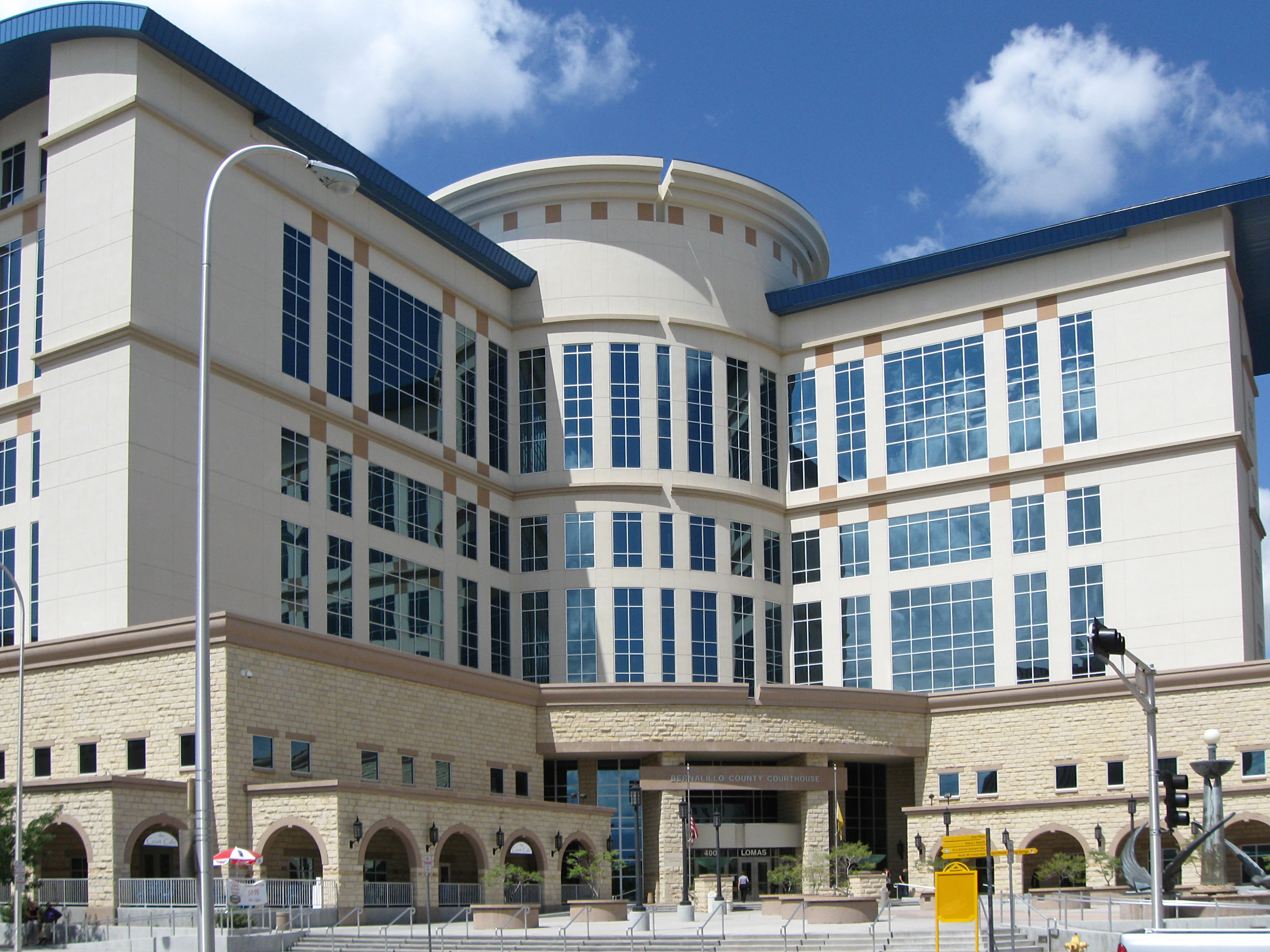
- Bernalillo County Courthouse in Albuquerque

- Seal

- Location within the U.S. state of New Mexico
- Coordinates: 35.05°N 106.67°W
- Country: United States
- State: New Mexico
- Founded: 1852
- Seat: Albuquerque
- Largest city: Albuquerque

Area
  - Total: 1,167 sq mi (3,020 km^{2})
  - Land: 1,161 sq mi (3,010 km^{2})
  - Water: 6.4 sq mi (17 km^{2}) 0.5%

Population (2020)
  - Total: 676,444
  - Estimate (2025): 667,601 ▼
  - Density: 580/sq mi (220/km^{2})
- Time zone: UTC−7 (Mountain)
  - Summer (DST): UTC−6 (MDT)
- Congressional districts: 1st, 2nd
- Website: bernco.gov

Bernalillo County (/ˌbɜːrnəˈliːjoʊ/) is the most populous county in the U.S. state of New Mexico. As of the 2020 census, the population was 676,444. The county seat, Albuquerque, is the most populous city in New Mexico. Bernalillo County is the central county of the Albuquerque, NM Metropolitan Statistical Area.

== History ==
Bernalillo County was one of seven partidos established during Mexican rule; in 1852, within two years of the creation of the New Mexico Territory, Bernalillo became one of that territory's nine original counties. Bernalillo County was named for the town of Bernalillo, which is no longer part of the county. The towns of Los Ranchos de Albuquerque and Bernalillo were previously the county seats, but the capital was finally established in Albuquerque in 1883. In 1876, it absorbed Santa Ana County.

In 1906, years after the Land Revision Act of 1891 provided for the setting aside of forest reserves, the parts of Bernalillo County currently known as Cibola National Forest were established as reserves.

USS LST-306, a World War II tank landing ship that participated in the Allied invasion of Italy, was renamed as USS Bernalillo County in 1955. Sandia Mountain Wilderness was created in 1978 and the Petroglyph National Monument was established in June 1990.

== Geography ==
According to the U.S. Census Bureau, the county has a total area of 1,167 square miles (3,020 km^{2}), of which 1,161 square miles (3,010 km^{2}) is land and 6.4 square miles (17 km^{2}) (0.5%) is water. It is the third-smallest county in New Mexico by area.

Bernalillo County is in central New Mexico, and "stretches from the East Mountain area (just east of the Sandia Mountains) to the Volcano Cliffs on the west mesa."

=== Adjacent counties ===
- Sandoval County - north
- Santa Fe County - east
- Torrance County - east
- Valencia County - south
- Cibola County - west

=== National protected areas ===
- Cibola National Forest (part)
- El Camino Real de Tierra Adentro National Historic Trail (part)
- Petroglyph National Monument

== Demographics ==
Historical population
Census	Pop.	Note	%±
1850	7,751		—
1860	8,769		13.1%
1870	7,591		−13.4%
1880	17,225		126.9%
1890	20,913		21.4%
1900	28,630		36.9%
1910	23,606		−17.5%
1920	29,855		26.5%
1930	45,430		52.2%
1940	69,391		52.7%
1950	145,673		109.9%
1960	262,199		80.0%
1970	315,774		20.4%
1980	419,700		32.9%
1990	480,577		14.5%
2000	556,678		15.8%
2010	662,564		19.0%
2020	676,444		2.1%
2025 (est.)	667,601	▼	−1.3%
U.S. Decennial Census; 1790–1960 1900–1990; 1990–2000 2010–2019

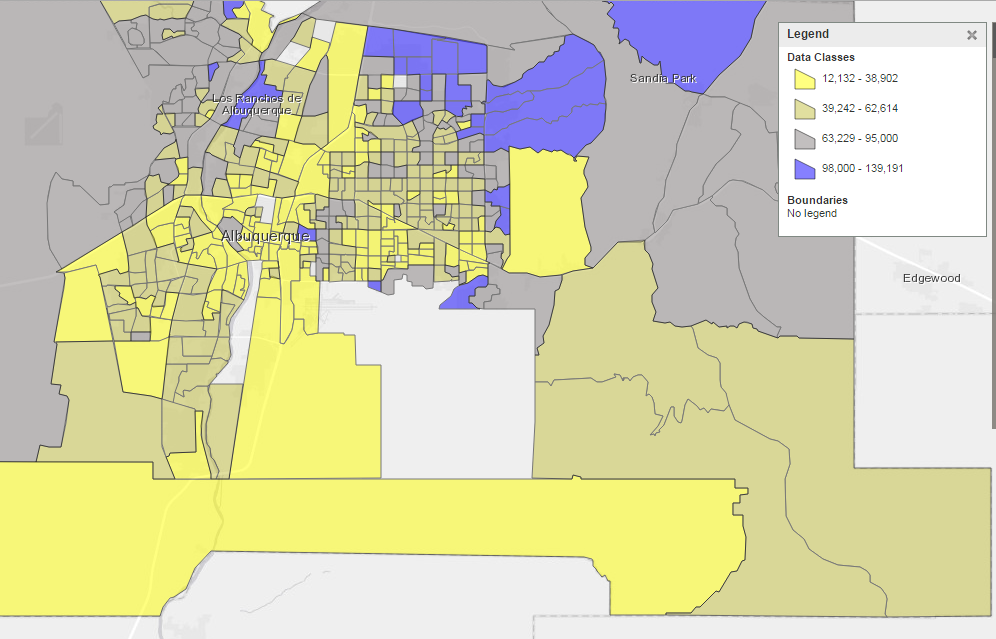
Median household income by census tract block group across Albuquerque metro

=== 2020 census ===
As of the 2020 census, the county had a population of 676,444. The median age was 38.9 years, with 21.1% of residents under the age of 18 and 17.5% aged 65 or older. For every 100 females, there were 95.5 males, and for every 100 females age 18 and over, there were 93.4 males.

The racial makeup of the county was 52.2% White, 3.2% Black or African American, 5.6% American Indian and Alaska Native, 3.0% Asian, 0.1% Native Hawaiian and Pacific Islander, 14.9% from some other race, and 21.0% from two or more races. Hispanic or Latino residents of any race comprised 48.7% of the population.

Bernalillo County, New Mexico – Racial and ethnic composition Note: the US Census treats Hispanic/Latino as an ethnic category. This table excludes Latinos from the racial categories and assigns them to a separate category. Hispanics/Latinos may be of any race.
Race / Ethnicity (NH = Non-Hispanic)	Pop 2000	Pop 2010	Pop 2020	% 2000	% 2010	% 2020
White alone (NH)	268,972	274,862	253,355	48.32%	41.48%	37.45%
Black or African American alone (NH)	13,700	16,293	17,871	2.46%	2.46%	2.64%
Native American or Alaska Native alone (NH)	19,776	26,258	30,628	3.55%	3.96%	4.53%
Asian alone (NH)	10,289	14,631	19,226	1.85%	2.21%	2.84%
Pacific Islander alone (NH)	398	469	564	0.07%	0.07%	0.08%
Other race alone (NH)	864	1,450	3,505	0.16%	0.22%	0.52%
Mixed race or Multiracial (NH)	9,114	11,512	21,814	1.64%	1.74%	3.22%
Hispanic or Latino (any race)	233,565	317,089	329,481	41.96%	47.86%	48.71%
Total	556,678	662,564	676,444	100.00%	100.00%	100.00%

96.0% of residents lived in urban areas, while 4.0% lived in rural areas.

There were 279,298 households in the county, of which 27.6% had children under the age of 18 living with them and 30.5% had a female householder with no spouse or partner present. About 32.1% of all households were made up of individuals and 12.2% had someone living alone who was 65 years of age or older. There were 299,451 housing units, of which 6.7% were vacant. Among occupied housing units, 61.7% were owner-occupied and 38.3% were renter-occupied; the homeowner vacancy rate was 1.6% and the rental vacancy rate was 7.9%.

=== 2010 census ===
As of the 2010 United States census, there were 662,564 people, 266,000 households, and 164,104 families living in the county. The population density was 570.8 inhabitants per square mile (220.4 inhabitants/km^{2}). There were 284,234 housing units at an average density of 244.9 units per square mile (94.6 units/km^{2}). The racial makeup of the county was 69.4% white, 4.8% American Indian, 3.0% black or African American, 2.3% Asian, 0.1% Pacific islander, 16.0% from other races, and 4.4% from two or more races. Those of Hispanic or Latino origin made up 47.9% of the population. The largest ancestry groups were:

- 27.6% Mexican
- 18.5% Spanish
- 11.6% German
- 8.5% Irish
- 7.6% English
- 3.4% Italian
- 2.6% American
- 2.3% French
- 1.9% Scottish
- 1.7% Scotch-Irish
- 1.7% Polish
- 1.3% Norwegian
- 1.2% Swedish
- 1.1% Dutch

Of the 266,000 households, 31.9% had children under the age of 18 living with them, 41.4% were married couples living together, 14.1% had a female householder with no husband present, 38.3% were non-families, and 30.4% of all households were made up of individuals. The average household size was 2.45 and the average family size was 3.07. The median age was 35.8 years.

The median income for a household in the county was $47,481 and the median income for a family was $59,809. Males had a median income of $42,189 versus $34,432 for females. The per capita income for the county was $26,143. About 11.8% of families and 15.6% of the population were below the poverty line, including 22.8% of those under age 18 and 9.8% of those age 65 or over.

=== 2000 census ===
As of the census of 2000, there were 556,678 people, 220,936 households, and 141,178 families living in the county, making Bernalillo the most populous county in the state. The population density was 477 inhabitants per square mile (184 inhabitants/km^{2}). There were 239,074 housing units at an average density of 205 units per square mile (79/km^{2}). The racial makeup of the county was 70.75% White, 2.77% Black or African American, 4.16% Native American, 1.93% Asian, 0.10% Pacific Islander, 16.07% from other races, and 4.22% from two or more races. 41.96% of the population were Hispanic or Latino of any race.

There were 220,936 households, out of which 31.40% had children under the age of 18 living with them, 46.00% were married couples living together, 12.90% had a female householder with no husband present, and 36.10% were non-families. 28.50% of all households were made up of individuals, and 7.90% had someone living alone who was 65 years of age or older. The average household size was 2.47 and the average family size was 3.06.

In the county, 25.30% of the population was under the age of 18, 10.30% was from 18 to 24, 30.40% from 25 to 44, 22.40% from 45 to 64, and 11.50% was 65 years of age or older. The median age was 35 years. For every 100 females there were 95.50 males. For every 100 females age 18 and over, there were 92.90 males.

The median income for a household in the county was $38,788, and the median income for a family was $46,613. Males had a median income of $33,720 versus $26,318 for females. The per capita income for the county was $20,790. About 10.20% of families and 13.70% of the population were below the poverty line, including 17.90% of those under age 18 and 9.10% of those age 65 or over.

== Politics ==
=== County commission ===
District	Name	Party	Took office
1	Barbara Baca	Democratic	2023
2	Frank Baca	Democratic	2015
3	Adriann Barboa	Democratic	2021
4	Walt Benson	Republican	2021
5	Eric C. Olivas	Democratic	2023

=== County offices ===
Current officeholders
Sheriff	Assessor	Clerk	Treasurer	Probate judge
John Allen (D); 2023–present	Damian Lara (D); 2023–present	Michelle Kavanaugh (D); 2025–present	Tim Eichenberg (D); 2025–present	Cristy J. Carbón-Gaul (D); 2019–present

=== New Mexico Senate ===
District	Name	Party	Took office
9	Brenda McKenna	Democratic	2021
10	Katy Duhigg	Democratic	2021
11	Linda M. Lopez	Democratic	1997
12	Jerry Ortiz y Pino	Democratic	2005
13	Bill B. O'Neill	Democratic	2013
14	Michael Padilla	Democratic	2013
15	Daniel Ivey-Soto	Democratic	2013
16	Antoinette Sedillo Lopez	Democratic	2019
17	Mimi Stewart	Democratic	2009
18	Bill Tallman	Democratic	2017
19	Gregg Schmedes	Republican	2021
20	Martin Hickey	Democratic	2021
21	Mark Moores	Republican	2013
22	Benny Shendo	Democratic	2013
23	Harold Pope Jr.	Democratic	2021
26	Moe Maestas	Democratic	2022
29	Gregory A. Baca	Republican	2021
39	Liz Stefanics	Democratic	2017

=== Congressional ===
- Melanie Stansbury (D) is the representative for the 1st Congressional District.
- Gabe Vasquez (D) is the representative for the 2nd Congressional District.

=== Presidential ===
United States presidential election results for Bernalillo County, New Mexico
Year	Republican		Democratic		Third party(ies)	
Year	No.	%	No.	%	No.	%
1912	1,002	26.61%	1,199	31.85%	1,564	41.54%
1916	2,711	52.26%	2,394	46.14%	83	1.60%
1920	4,969	50.53%	4,808	48.90%	56	0.57%
1924	7,078	49.55%	6,023	42.17%	1,183	8.28%
1928	8,725	56.99%	6,572	42.92%	14	0.09%
1932	7,309	40.06%	10,722	58.77%	212	1.16%
1936	7,107	31.47%	15,305	67.78%	170	0.75%
1940	11,999	45.35%	14,428	54.53%	34	0.13%
1944	11,662	48.79%	12,229	51.16%	13	0.05%
1948	16,668	47.13%	18,305	51.76%	391	1.11%
1952	33,964	59.38%	23,164	40.50%	72	0.13%
1956	41,893	64.31%	22,954	35.24%	296	0.45%
1960	44,805	52.06%	40,908	47.53%	348	0.40%
1964	42,583	43.31%	55,036	55.98%	698	0.71%
1968	56,234	54.96%	40,835	39.91%	5,252	5.13%
1972	79,993	60.80%	48,753	37.06%	2,816	2.14%
1976	76,614	53.98%	63,949	45.06%	1,363	0.96%
1980	83,956	53.45%	54,841	34.92%	18,266	11.63%
1984	104,694	60.08%	67,789	38.90%	1,779	1.02%
1988	92,830	53.62%	78,346	45.25%	1,959	1.13%
1992	77,304	38.52%	90,863	45.27%	32,531	16.21%
1996	78,832	43.19%	88,140	48.28%	15,571	8.53%
2000	95,249	46.62%	99,461	48.68%	9,609	4.70%
2004	121,454	47.29%	132,252	51.50%	3,105	1.21%
2008	110,521	38.67%	171,556	60.03%	3,701	1.30%
2012	106,408	39.27%	150,739	55.63%	13,822	5.10%
2016	94,698	34.48%	143,417	52.22%	36,547	13.31%
2020	116,135	36.57%	193,757	61.01%	7,698	2.42%
2024	118,762	38.21%	184,117	59.23%	7,965	2.56%

In presidential elections prior to 1992, Bernalillo County primarily voted for Republican Party candidates, supporting only three Democratic candidates in six elections total. (Franklin D. Roosevelt four times, Harry S. Truman and Lyndon B. Johnson once each).

From 1992 on, the county has backed Democratic Party candidates in every presidential election. While the margins were relatively narrow from 1992 to 2004, since then the county has tilted strongly Democratic similar to many urban counties nationwide.

The region around Nob Hill and Downtown, which includes the University of New Mexico, is where the greatest Democratic strength in the county lies, with parts of the North Valley near the river also contributing. The Isleta Reservation in the southern strip of the county is also a highly Democratic region. The majority Hispanic South Valley, as well as Atrisco and Armijo, which have long been Democratic strongholds, have been trending strongly toward the Republican party, with several precincts flipping in the 2024 election. Republican strength in the county lies east of Tijeras, in parts of the southeast near Kirtland Air Force Base, and for a long time in much of the Northeast Heights region. This latter area showed a Democratic trend in the 2024 election.

== Communities ==

A local toponymic oddity is that the town of Bernalillo, north of Albuquerque, is no longer in Bernalillo County. When established in 1852, the county was named for the town of Bernalillo. But the latter was incorporated into the newly established Sandoval County in 1903.

Bracketed number refers to location on map, right

=== Cities ===
- Albuquerque (3) (county seat)
- Rio Rancho (partial)

=== Town ===
- Edgewood (partial)

=== Villages ===
- Los Ranchos de Albuquerque (1)
- Tijeras (6)

=== Census-designated places ===
- Carnuel (9)
- Cedar Crest (5)
- Cedro
- Chilili (8)
- Edith Enclave
- Isleta (7)
- Kirtland AFB
- Manzano Springs (partial)
- North Valley (2)
- Paa-Ko
- Pajarito Mesa
- Paradise Hills
- Ponderosa Pine
- San Antonito
- Sandia Heights
- Sandia Knolls
- Sandia Park
- Sedillo
- South Valley (4)

=== Unincorporated communities ===
- Alameda
- Barton
- Cañoncito
- Isleta Pueblo
- Laguna Pueblo
- Sandia Pueblo (partial)
- Zuzax

== Education ==
There are three school districts in the county:

- Albuquerque Public Schools
- Moriarty Municipal Schools
- Rio Rancho Public Schools

Bureau of Indian Education (BIE) schools:

- Isleta Elementary School
- Albuquerque Indian School (closed)

Southwestern Indian Polytechnic Institute (SIPI), a BIE community college, is in an unincorporated area in the county.

== Transportation ==
=== Major highways ===
- I-25 / US 85 (unsigned)
- I-40
- NM 14
- NM 45
- NM 47
- NM 147
- NM 165
- NM 217
- NM 313
- NM 314
- NM 317
- NM 327
- NM 333
- NM 337
- NM 345
- NM 423
- NM 448
- NM 473
- NM 500
- NM 528
- NM 536
- NM 556

=== Intercity rail ===
- Amtrak serves Albuquerque with a station located adjacent to the Alvarado Transportation Center. It is on the Southwest Chief line which runs between Los Angeles and Chicago.

=== Public transportation ===
- ABQ RIDE provides public transit bus service to Albuquerque. In addition to local and express service, it operates the Albuquerque Rapid Transit (ART) bus rapid transit lines, which replaced the Rapid Ride BRT system in 2020.
- New Mexico Rail Runner Express (NMRX) operates a commuter rail service between Belen and Santa Fe, with stops in Bernalillo County including the Alvarado Transportation Center (the main hub of ABQ Ride) in downtown Albuquerque.

=== Air ===
- Albuquerque International Sunport (ABQ) is the major airport serving Albuquerque and Central New Mexico.

== See also ==
- National Register of Historic Places listings in Bernalillo County, New Mexico
