= Rapid Ride =

Express bus service in Albuquerque, New Mexico

The original Rapid Ride logo in 2004

Rapid Ride was an express bus service with limited bus rapid transit (BRT) features which was operated by ABQ RIDE, the local transit agency in Albuquerque, New Mexico, from 2004 to 2020. The Rapid Ride name was phased out in 2020 with the rebranding of the one remaining Rapid Ride line as ARTx, though the service remains essentially the same.

The original Rapid Ride line was inaugurated on December 21, 2004, serving an 11-mile (18 km) route along the Central Avenue corridor. It was intended to provide a faster and more efficient means of public transit in Albuquerque and to serve as a pilot project for a potential light rail line. Growing ridership led to the opening of a second route in 2007 and a third route in 2009. By March 2008, Rapid Ride had carried five million passengers. In 2019, the Rapid Ride Red and Green Lines were replaced by a true BRT system, Albuquerque Rapid Transit (ART). The Rapid Ride Blue Line, which serves the West Side, remains in operation, but was rebranded as ARTx Blue Line in 2020.

== Service ==
As of 2021, the only active Rapid Ride/ARTx route is the 790 Blue Line, which runs from the University of New Mexico west down Lomas Boulevard, north on Rio Grande Boulevard, west on Interstate-40, and then north on Coors Boulevard past the Cottonwood Mall to the Northwest Transit Center. The Blue Line operates from 5:30 a.m. to 9:30 p.m. on weekdays with buses scheduled every 12 to 30 minutes depending on time of day, with more limited service on Saturdays. The other two routes, the 766 Red Line and 777 Green Line were discontinued in November, 2019, when the Albuquerque Rapid Transit system went into operation along the same Central Avenue corridor. The Red Line ran along Central Avenue from Unser Boulevard to Louisiana Boulevard, then north to the Uptown Transit Center, while the Green Line ran along Central Avenue from Downtown Albuquerque to Tramway Boulevard.

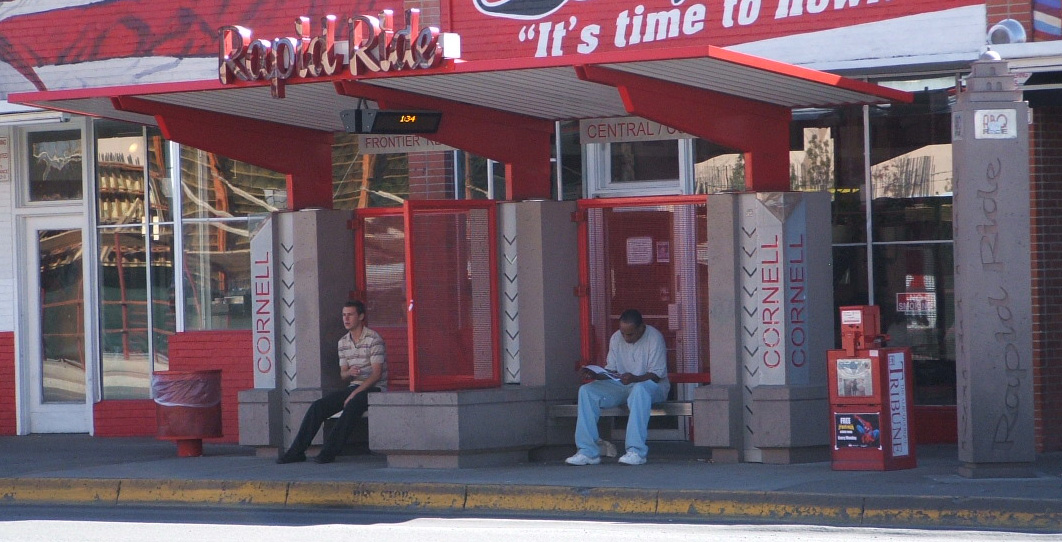
A typical Rapid Ride station.

The service offers some BRT-like elements, including limited stops about 1 mile (1.6 km) apart instead of two blocks and high-capacity articulated buses with quick-deploying ramps and other accessible features. However, unlike a true BRT system, the buses run in regular traffic and do not have off-bus fare payment. The buses also no longer have signal priority, though this was a feature of the original Rapid Ride line until 2009. Stops are equipped with distinctive branded shelters and signage, including digital message boards to announce upcoming arrivals. When all three lines were in operation, buses reached stations roughly every 7–10 minutes between Downtown and Louisiana, and every 10–15 minutes between Wyoming and Tramway and between Rio Grande and Unser.

Every route within the ABQ RIDE system, with the exception of #222 and #34, connects to a Rapid Ride or ART route, either at one of the Transit Centers, or along its route (usually either on Central Avenue or on Coors Boulevard).

== Fleet ==
The Rapid Ride consisted of 18 New Flyer DE60LF and 6 New Flyer DE60LFR 60-foot low floor articulated buses, which were painted in ABQ RIDE's red and gold color scheme. All Rapid Ride buses had free wireless internet access and were also equipped with Digital Recorders automated stop announcement systems and TwinVision LED destination signs. The front destination signs featured a multicolor route number display and orange route name display. The route number was displayed in red for the Rapid Ride Route 766, blue for Route 790, and in green for Route 777. The side and rear destination signs were orange-only.

=== Former ===
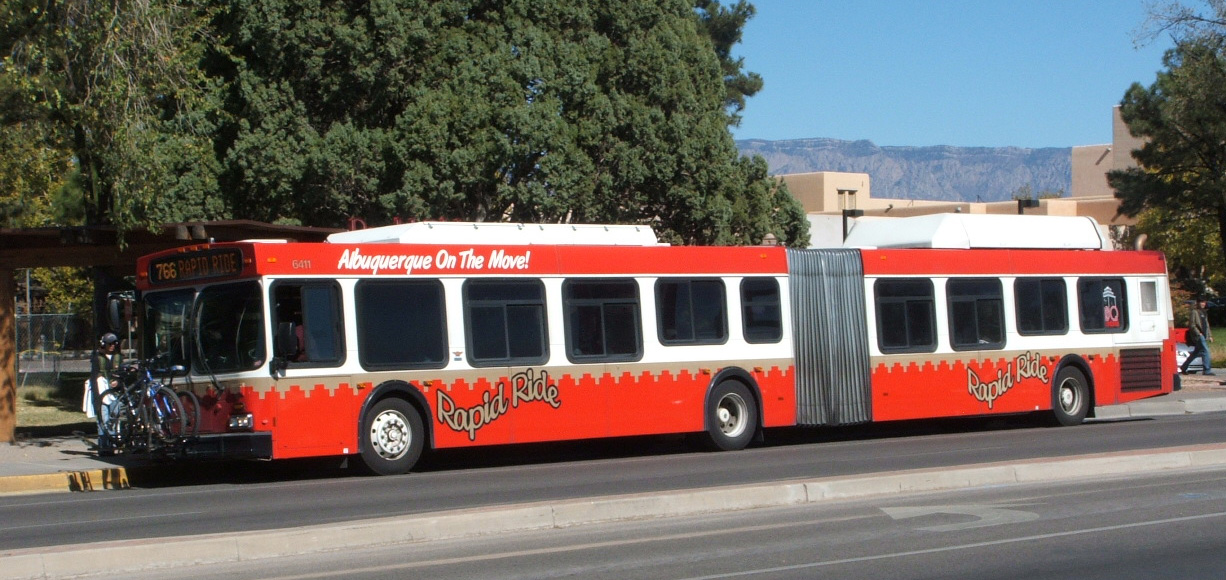
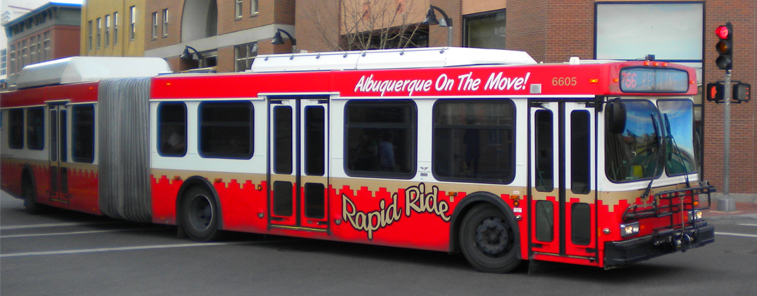
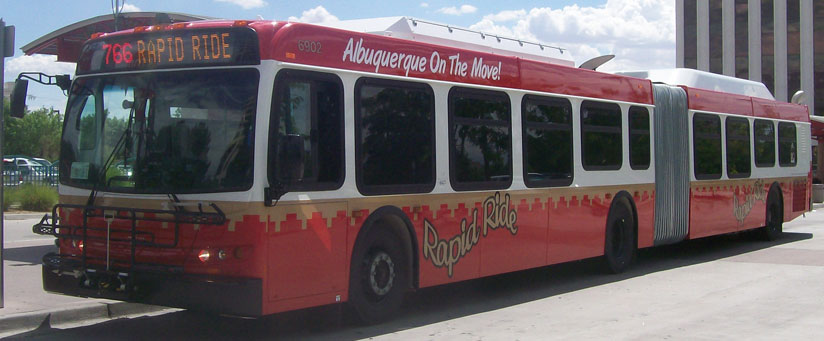
Number	Year	Make / Model	Image	Comments
6401-6412	2004	New Flyer; DE60LF		Original Rapid Ride fleet Fareboxes upgraded from GFI CENTSaBILL to GFI Odyssey in October 2009
6601-6606	2006	New Flyer; DE60LF		Similar to 6400-series, with updated windows and air circulation system. Features the new GFI Odyssey fareboxes.
6901-6906	2009	New Flyer; DE60LFR		Features restyled front end, video screens, and LED interior lighting.

== Ridership ==
Ridership on the Red Line was 1.6 million boardings for fiscal year 2007, up 28% over fiscal year 2006, and was projected to finish fiscal year 2008 with a 13% gain. Bus ridership as a whole was up 9.3% in Albuquerque in fiscal 2007. The Blue Line had over 20,000 boardings per month as of early 2008.

== History ==
=== Original route (Red Line) ===
Rapid Ride service began on December 24, 2004, with the Route 766 line, which ran along Central Avenue from Unser to Wyoming, North to Interstate 40, then west to the Uptown Transit Center. Buses ran every 11 minutes from 6:00 a.m. to 8:30 p.m. on weekdays and Saturdays. On August 20, 2006, the 766 started Sunday service with 22-minute frequency from 6:43 a.m. to 6:41 p.m.

=== Pilot project for second Rapid Ride route ===
On April 17, 2006, a second Rapid Ride route, the West Side Rapid Ride (156) started service. It ran as a commuter with four (two northbound and two southbound) runs in the morning and three (two northbound and one southbound) runs in the evening on weekdays. The route ran on Coors Blvd from Cottonwood Mall to the Alamosa Community Center. This route served as a pilot project for a potential full-time route for the Albuquerque West Side, and was later replaced by a new route (mentioned below) in July 2007.

=== First expansion of fleet, Blue Line introduced ===
ABQ RIDE placed an order for six additional Rapid Ride buses on July 20, 2006. The six buses were once again the New Flyer DE60LF, and were delivered in February 2007. These new buses were put to use on a new West Side route (Route 790) connecting the University of New Mexico to a portion of Albuquerque's Westside, via Lomas Boulevard, Rio Grande Boulevard, Interstate 40, and Coors Boulevard to the Montano Plaza shopping center. This new route replaced the 156 route and went into service on July 7, 2007, with 15-minute frequency on weekdays and 20-minute frequency on Saturdays. With the creation of this line, ABQ Ride began to give Rapid Ride routes color designations (Red for 766, Blue for 790). On August 16, 2008, the Blue Line was extended to Cottonwood Mall and weekday frequency changed to 20 minutes. When the new Northwest Transit Center opened on September 2, 2008, all buses serving Cottonwood Mall moved there, although a stop at Cottonwood Mall on 7 Bar Loop still remains for mall commuter traffic.

=== Rapid After Dark ===
For several years, ABQ RIDE operated the Red Line from 8:00pm until 1:00am on Fridays during Saturdays during the summer months. The route was called Rapid After Dark, and given its own route number, 767, even though the route did not deviate from the daytime route. The city disbanded the service in 2011 in favor of a new service, 66 Late Night. The New service utilizes the 66 route, allowing for more stops and traveling the full length of Central Ave.

=== Increased service along Central Avenue, Green Line introduced ===
On February 26, 2009, ABQ RIDE announced a third Rapid Ride route, Route 777 (the "Green Line"), which would run every 15 minutes on weekdays along Central Avenue from Downtown Albuquerque to the Four Hills area at Central Avenue and Tramway Boulevard, and help relieve overcrowding on the Rapid Ride Red Line and the Route 66 Central Avenue bus. In preparation for the new route, ABQ RIDE added six additional Rapid Ride buses to the fleet. The Rapid Ride Green Line went into service on August 15, 2009. The 766 route was adjusted from using Wyoming Boulevard to using Louisiana Boulevard to connect to the Uptown Transit Center. Frequency on the 766 was adjusted from every 11 minutes on weekdays to every 15 minutes, and the schedules are designed to overlap so that between the 766 and 777, service on Central Avenue between Louisiana and Downtown is every 7 minutes.

=== Possible future route ===
On an election on October 6, 2009, Albuquerque voters approved a quarter-cent transportation tax extension lasting until 2019. 36% of this tax will be allocated for ABQ RIDE, up from 20% for the past 10 years. On October 8, 2009, outgoing ABQ RIDE transit director Greg Payne indicated the possibility of a new Rapid Ride route on San Mateo Blvd.

=== Albuquerque Rapid Transit ===
In November 2011, ABQ RIDE announced plans for true bus rapid transit service along Central Avenue. The service differs from the Rapid Ride based on the fact that it would use a dedicated travel lane, and thus can be considered a true BRT service.

In October 2014, The City presented to voters its final proposal for Albuquerque Rapid Transit, a true BRT system extending from Tramway Blvd. to 98th St. The system went into service in November, 2019, replacing the Rapid Ride Red and Green Lines.

== List of Rapid Ride bus routes and connections ==
The following transit connections are made at the Alvarado Transportation Center:

- ABQ Ride bus routes: #5, #6, #7, #8, #10, #11, #12, #13, #16, #36, #40 D-Ride, #50, #53, #54, #66, #93, #94, #97, #217, #250
- ABQ Ride Rapid Ride routes: 766 Red Line and 777 Green Line
- Rio Metro #504, #505A, #505B
- NM Park & Ride Purple, Turquoise
- Southwest Chief
- Rail Runner Express

Route 766 - Red Line
(From West to East)

Station or stop	Other Rapid Ride lines	Bus connections
Central & Unser Transit Center (Terminus)		#54, #66, #198, Rio Metro #366
Central & Coors		#66, #155
Central & Atrisco		#51, #66
Central & Tingley		#66
Central & Rio Grande	790	#36, #66
Gold & 5th (Eastbound)	777	#53, #54, #66
Copper & 2nd (Westbound)	777	#40 D-Ride, #66
Copper & 5th (Westbound)	777	#40 D-Ride, #66
Alvarado Transportation Center	777	see above
Central & Edith	777	#66
Central & Cedar	777	#66
Central & Yale (Westbound)	777/790	#50, #66
Central & Cornell (Eastbound)	777	#66
Central & Carlisle	777	#16, #66
Central & San Mateo	777	#66, #140, #141
Central & Louisiana	777	#66, #157
Louisiana & Lomas		#11, #157
Indian School & Uptown Loop (Eastbound)		
Indian School & Louisiana (Westbound)		#12
Uptown Transit Center (Terminus)		#6, #8, #12, #34, #157

Route 777 - Green Line
(From West to East)

Station or stop	Other Rapid Ride lines	Bus connections
Copper & 5th (Westbound) (Terminus)	766	#40 D-Ride, #66
Copper & 2nd (Westbound)	766	#40 D-ride, #66
Gold & 5th (Eastbound)	766	#53, #54, #66
Alvarado Transportation Center	766	see above
Central & Edith	766	#66
Central & Cedar	766	#66
Central & Yale (Westbound)	766/790	#50, #66
Central & Cornell (Eastbound)	766	#66
Central & Carlisle	766	#16, #66
Central & San Mateo	766	#66, #140, #141
Central & Louisiana	766	#66, #157
Central & Wyoming		#31, #66, #97, #98
Central & Eubank		#2, #66
Central & Juan Tabo		#1, #66
Wenonah & Tramway		#1, #66

Route 790 - Blue Line
(From Northwest to Southeast)

Station or stop	Other Rapid Ride lines	Bus connections
Northwest Transit Center (Terminus)		#92, #94, #96, #98, #155, #157, #251, #551
7 Bar Loop & Cottonwood		#96, #155
Coors & Irving		#96, #155
Coors & Eagle Ranch		#96, #155
Coors & Montano Plaza		#96, #155, #157, #162
Coors & Dellyne		#96, #155
Coors & St. Josephs		#96, #155
Coors & Sequoia		#96, #155
Central & Rio Grande	766	#36, #66
Lomas & Fourth Street		#8, #36, #40 D-Ride, #92, #93, #94
Lomas & Stanford (Eastbound)		#5, #11, #12
Central & Yale (Terminus)	766/777	#50, #66

ROUTE 156 From north to south:
(no longer in service)

- Cottonwood Mall
- Coors at Irving (Target Store)
- Coors at Montano Plaza
- Coors at St. Josephs
- Coors at Sequoia
- Coors at Fortuna
- Coors at Central (transfer to Rapid Ride 766)
- Alamosa Community Center
