= San Antonito, Bernalillo County, New Mexico =

San Antonito, New Mexico
- Census-designated place
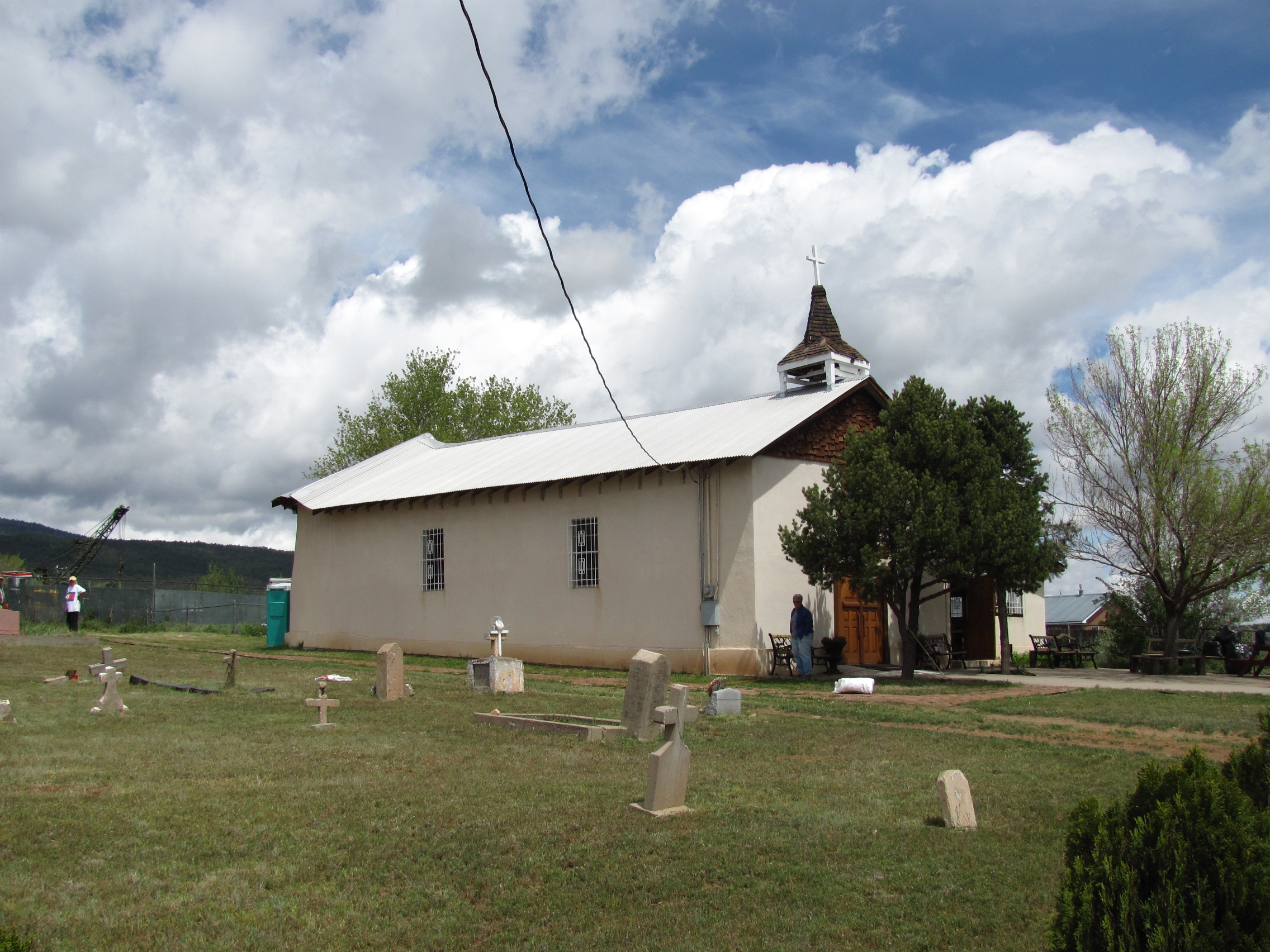
- San Antonito Church

- Location within New Mexico
- Coordinates: 35°09′27″N 106°20′51″W
- Country: United States
- State: New Mexico
- County: Bernalillo

Area
  - Total: 2.445 sq mi (6.33 km^{2})
  - Land: 2.445 sq mi (6.33 km^{2})
  - Water: 0 sq mi (0 km^{2})
- Elevation: 6,861 ft (2,091 m)

Population (2010)
  - Total: 985
  - Density: 403/sq mi (156/km^{2})
- Time zone: UTC-7 (Mountain (MST))
  - Summer (DST): UTC-6 (MDT)
- ZIP code: 87047
- Area code: 505
- GNIS feature ID: 2584200

San Antonito is a census-designated place in Bernalillo County, New Mexico, United States. Its population was 985 as of the 2010 census.

== Description ==
San Antonito Church and Cemetery, which is listed on the National Register of Historic Places, is located in San Antonito.

== Education ==
It is zoned to Albuquerque Public Schools.

== See also ==
- List of census-designated places in New Mexico
