= November 1 =

November 1 this year in various calendars
- Sunday, 1 November 2026
Akan	Fokwasi
Armenian	14 Trē 1476
Aztec	Atlcahualo 10, 10 Calli
Babylonian	19 Tashritu, 2337 SE
Balinese pawukon	Menga, Pasah, Sri, Paing, Tungleh, Redite of Sinta, Sri, Dangu, Sri
Bengali	16 Kartik, BS 1433
Chinese	Yin Earth Rabbit・Hairy Head Mansion; Fire Horse Year, Month 9, Day 23 (Shuangjiang, 6 days until Lidong)
Common Era	1 November 2026 CE
Coptic	22 Paopi, AM 1743
Egyptian	19 Phamenoth, 2775 NE
Ethiopian	22 Ṭeqemt, 2019 Amätä Məhrät
French Republican	Décade I, Décadi de Brumaire de l'Année 235 de la République
Gregorian	1 November, AD 2026
Hebrew	21 Cheshvan, AM 5787
Hindu	Punarvasu・Sādhya; Solar: 15 Kārtika, 1948 SE; Lunisolar: Saptamī, Kṛishna pakṣa of Āśvina, 2083 VE; Rāudra・5127 KY・1,872,880
Icelandic	Sunnudagur, 9 Gormánuður 2026
Islamic	20 Jumada al-awwal, AH 1448 (using tabular method)
ISO week date	2026-W44-7
Japanese	22 Nagatsuki, Reiwa 8 (Sōkō, 6 days until Rittō)
Julian	19 October, AD 2026 (AM 7535)
Julian day	2461346
Korean	22 Gaedal, 4359 DE
Maya	13.0.14.1.3; 16 Zac, 10 Akbal
Roman	ante diem XIV Kalendas Novembres, MMDCCLXXIX AUC
Solar Hijri	10 Aban, SH 1405
Tibetan	22 tha skar, me pho rta 2153 or 1772 or 1000

<<	November					>>
Su	Mo	Tu	We	Th	Fr	Sa
1	2	3	4	5	6	7
8	9	10	11	12	13	14
15	16	17	18	19	20	21
22	23	24	25	26	27	28
29	30
2026

November 1 in recent years
2026 (Sunday)
2025 (Saturday)
2024 (Friday)
2023 (Wednesday)
2022 (Tuesday)
2021 (Monday)
2020 (Sunday)
2019 (Friday)
2018 (Thursday)
2017 (Wednesday)

November 1 is the 305th day of the year (306th in leap years) in the Gregorian calendar; 60 days remain until the end of the year.

== Events ==
=== Pre-1600 ===
- 365 – Roman Emperor Valentinian I learns the Alemanni have crossed the Rhine and invaded Gaul.
- 996 – Emperor Otto III issues a deed to Gottschalk, Bishop of Freising, which is the oldest known document using the name Ostarrîchi (Austria in Old High German).
- 1141 – Empress Matilda's reign as "Lady of the English" ends as Stephen of Blois regains the title of "King of England".
- 1179 – Philip II is crowned King of France.
- 1214 – The port city of Sinope surrenders to the Seljuq Turks.
- 1348 – The anti-royalist Union of Valencia attacks the Jews of Murviedro on the pretext that they are serfs of the King of Valencia and thus "royalists".
- 1463 – David of Trebizond, the last emperor of Trebizond, is executed with various members of his family by the Ottomans near the Golden Gate of Constantinople.
- 1503 – Cardinal Giuliano della Rovere is elected Pope and takes the name Julius II.
- 1512 – The ceiling of the Sistine Chapel, painted by Michelangelo, is exhibited to the public for the first time.
- 1520 – The Strait of Magellan, the passage immediately south of mainland South America connecting the Pacific and the Atlantic Oceans, is first discovered and navigated by European explorer Ferdinand Magellan during the first recorded circumnavigation voyage.
- 1555 – French Huguenots establish the France Antarctique colony in present-day Rio de Janeiro, Brazil.
- 1570 – The All Saints' Flood devastates the Dutch coast.

=== 1601–1900 ===
- 1612 – During the Time of Troubles, Polish troops are expelled from Moscow's Kitay-gorod by Russian troops under the command of Dmitry Pozharsky (22 October O.S.).
- 1683 – The British Crown colony of New York is subdivided into 12 counties.
- 1755 – In Portugal, Lisbon is totally devastated by a massive earthquake and tsunami, killing an estimated 40,000 to 60,000 people.
- 1765 – The British Parliament enacts the Stamp Act on the Thirteen Colonies in order to help pay for British military operations in North America.
- 1800 – John Adams becomes the first President of the United States to live in the Executive Mansion (later renamed the White House).
- 1805 – Napoleon Bonaparte invades Austria during the War of the Third Coalition.
- 1814 – Congress of Vienna opens to redraw the European political map after the defeat of France in the Napoleonic Wars.
- 1848 – In Boston, Massachusetts, the first medical school for women, Boston Female Medical School (which later merged with the Boston University School of Medicine), opens.
- 1856 – The British Empire declares war on Iran following Naser al-Din Shah's capture of Herat.
- 1861 – American Civil War: U.S. President Abraham Lincoln appoints George B. McClellan as the commander of the Union Army, replacing General Winfield Scott.
- 1870 – In the United States, the Weather Bureau (later renamed the National Weather Service) makes its first official meteorological forecast.
- 1893 – The Battle of Bembezi took place and was the most decisive battle won by the British in the First Matabele War of 1893.
- 1894 – Nicholas II becomes the new (and last) Tsar of Russia after his father, Alexander III, dies.
- 1894 – Buffalo Bill, 15 of his Native Americans, and Annie Oakley were filmed by Thomas Edison in his Black Maria Studio in West Orange, New Jersey.
- 1896 – A picture showing the bare breasts of a woman appears in National Geographic magazine for the first time.
- 1897 – The first Library of Congress building opens its doors to the public; the library had previously been housed in the Congressional Reading Room in the U.S. Capitol.
- 1897 – Italian Sport-Club Juventus is founded by a group of students of Liceo Classico Massimo d'Azeglio.

=== 1901–present ===
- 1905 – Lahti, a city in Finland, is granted city rights by Tsar Nicholas II of Russia, the last Grand Duke of Finland.
- 1911 – World's first combat aerial bombing mission takes place in Libya during the Italo-Turkish War. Second Lieutenant Giulio Gavotti of Italy drops several small bombs.
- 1914 – World War I: The first British Royal Navy defeat of the war with Germany, the Battle of Coronel, is fought off of the western coast of Chile, in the Pacific, with the loss of HMS Good Hope and HMS Monmouth.
- 1914 – World War I: The Australian Imperial Force (AIF) departed by ship in a single convoy from Albany, Western Australia bound for Egypt.
- 1916 – In Russia, Pavel Milyukov delivers in the State Duma the famous "stupidity or treason" speech, precipitating the downfall of the government of Boris Stürmer.
- 1918 – World War I: With a brave action carried out into the waters of the Austro-Hungarian port of Pula, two officers of the Italian Regia Marina sink with a manned torpedo the enemy battleship SMS Viribus Unitis.
- 1918 – Malbone Street wreck: The worst rapid transit accident in US history occurs under the intersection of Malbone Street and Flatbush Avenue, Brooklyn, New York City, with at least 102 deaths.
- 1918 – Western Ukraine separates from Austria-Hungary.
- 1922 – Abolition of the Ottoman sultanate: The last sultan of the Ottoman Empire, Mehmed VI, abdicates.
- 1923 – The Finnish airline Aero O/Y (now Finnair) is founded.
- 1928 – The Law on the Adoption and Implementation of the Turkish Alphabet, replaces the Arabic alphabet with the Latin alphabet.
- 1937 – Stalinists execute Pastor Paul Hamberg and seven members of Azerbaijan's Lutheran community.
- 1938 – Seabiscuit defeats War Admiral in an upset victory during a match race deemed "the match of the century" in horse racing.
- 1941 – American photographer Ansel Adams takes a picture of a moonrise over the town of Hernandez, New Mexico that would become one of the most famous images in the history of photography.
- 1942 – World War II: Matanikau Offensive begins during the Guadalcanal campaign and ends three days later with an American victory.
- 1943 – World War II: The 3rd Marine Division, United States Marines, landing on Bougainville in the Solomon Islands, secures a beachhead, leading that night to a naval clash at the Battle of Empress Augusta Bay.
- 1944 – World War II: Units of the British Army land at Walcheren.
- 1945 – The official North Korean newspaper, Rodong Sinmun, is first published under the name Chongro.
- 1948 – Athenagoras I, Ecumenical Patriarch of Constantinople, is enthroned.
- 1949 – All 55 people on board Eastern Air Lines Flight 537 are killed when the Douglas DC-4 operating the flight collides in mid-air with a Bolivian Air Force Lockheed P-38 Lightning aircraft over Alexandria, Virginia.
- 1951 – Operation Buster–Jangle: Six thousand five hundred United States Army soldiers are exposed to 'Desert Rock' atomic explosions for training purposes in Nevada. Participation is not voluntary.
- 1952 – Nuclear weapons testing: The United States successfully detonates Ivy Mike, the first thermonuclear device, at the Eniwetok atoll. The explosion had a yield of ten megatons TNT equivalent.
- 1954 – The Front de Libération Nationale fires the first shots of the Algerian War of Independence.
- 1955 – The establishment of a Military Assistance Advisory Group in South Vietnam marks the beginning of American involvement in the conflict.
- 1955 – The bombing of United Air Lines Flight 629 occurs near Longmont, Colorado, killing all 39 passengers and five crew members aboard the Douglas DC-6B airliner.
- 1956 – The Indian states Kerala, Andhra Pradesh, and Mysore are formally created under the States Reorganisation Act; Kanyakumari district is joined to Tamil Nadu from Kerala. Delhi was established as a union territory.
- 1956 – Hungarian Revolution: Imre Nagy announces Hungary's neutrality and withdrawal from the Warsaw Pact. Soviet troops begin to re-enter Hungary, contrary to assurances by the Soviet government. János Kádár and Ferenc Münnich secretly defect to the Soviets.
- 1956 – The Springhill mining disaster in Springhill, Nova Scotia kills 39 miners; 88 are rescued.
- 1957 – The Mackinac Bridge, the world's longest suspension bridge between anchorages at the time, opens to traffic connecting Michigan's upper and lower peninsulas.
- 1963 – The Arecibo Observatory in Arecibo, Puerto Rico, with the largest radio telescope ever constructed, officially opens.
- 1963 – The 1963 South Vietnamese coup begins.
- 1968 – The Motion Picture Association of America's film rating system is officially introduced, originating with the ratings G, M, R, and X.
- 1970 – Club Cinq-Sept fire in Saint-Laurent-du-Pont, France kills 146 young people.
- 1973 – Watergate scandal: Leon Jaworski is appointed as the new Watergate Special Prosecutor.
- 1973 – The Indian state of Mysore is renamed as Karnataka to represent all the regions within Karunadu.
- 1976 – Burundian president Michel Micombero is deposed in a bloodless military coup d'état by deputy Jean-Baptiste Bagaza.
- 1979 – In Bolivia, Colonel Alberto Natusch executes a bloody coup d'état against the constitutional government of Wálter Guevara.
- 1979 – Griselda Álvarez becomes the first female governor of a state of Mexico.
- 1981 – Antigua and Barbuda gains independence from the United Kingdom.
- 1982 – Honda becomes the first Asian automobile company to produce cars in the United States with the opening of its factory in Marysville, Ohio; a Honda Accord is the first car produced there.
- 1984 – After the assassination of Indira Gandhi, Prime Minister of India on 31 October 1984, by two of her Sikh bodyguards, anti-Sikh riots erupt.
- 1987 – British Rail Class 43 (HST) hits the record speed of 238 km/h for rail vehicles with on-board fuel to generate electricity for traction motors.
- 1991 – President of the Chechen Republic Dzhokhar Dudayev declares sovereignty of the Chechen Republic of Ichkeria from the Russian Federation.
- 1993 – The Maastricht Treaty takes effect, formally establishing the European Union.
- 1997 – Titanic premieres publicly at Tokyo festival, launching a global blockbuster career.
- 2000 – Chhattisgarh officially becomes the 26th state of India, formed from sixteen districts of eastern Madhya Pradesh.
- 2000 – Serbia and Montenegro joins the United Nations.
- 2001 – Turkey, Australia, and Canada agree to commit troops to the invasion of Afghanistan.
- 2004 – A suicide bombing at the Carmel Market in Tel Aviv kills three people and injures 50.
- 2009 – An Ilyushin Il-76 crashes near the Mir mine after takeoff from Mirny Airport in Yakutia, killing all 11 aboard.
- 2011 – Mario Draghi succeeds Jean-Claude Trichet and becomes the third president of the European Central Bank.
- 2012 – A fuel tank truck crashes and explodes in the Saudi Arabian capital Riyadh, killing 26 people and injuring 135.
- 2024 – A concrete canopy collapses at the Novi Sad railway station, killing 16 people and injuring three.
- 2026 – Andrea Kimi Antonelli becomes the youngest ever Formula One World Champion, as well as the first Italian champion since Alberto Ascari in 1953, securing the title at the Mexican Grand Prix.
- 2026 – A private Learjet 60 business jet, en route from Austin, Texas to North Eleuthera, The Bahamas, crashes at high-speed in Palm Beach County, Florida, killing all nine occupants onboard and injuring one person on the ground.

== Births ==
=== Pre-1600 ===
- 846 – Louis the Stammerer, Frankish king (died 879)
- 1339 – Rudolf IV, Duke of Austria (died 1365)
- 1351 – Leopold III, Duke of Austria (died 1386)
- 1419 – Albert II, Duke of Brunswick-Grubenhagen (died 1485)
- 1498 – Giovanni Ricci, Italian cardinal (died 1574)
- 1499 – Rodrigo of Aragon, Italian noble (died 1512)
- 1522 – Andrew Corbet, English landowner and politician (died 1578)
- 1526 – Catherine Jagiellon, queen of John III of Sweden (died 1583)
- 1527 – William Brooke, 10th Baron Cobham, English noble and politician (died 1597)
- 1530 – Étienne de La Boétie, French philosopher and judge (died 1563)
- 1539 – Pierre Pithou, French lawyer and scholar (died 1596)
- 1550 – Henry of Saxe-Lauenburg, Prince-Archbishop of Bremen, Prince-Bishop of Osnabrück and Paderborn (died 1585)
- 1567 – Diego Sarmiento de Acuña, 1st Count of Gondomar, Spanish academic and diplomat (died 1626)
- 1585 – Jan Brożek, Polish mathematician, physician, and astronomer (died 1652)
- 1596 – Pietro da Cortona, Italian painter (died 1669)

=== 1601–1900 ===
- 1607 – Georg Philipp Harsdörffer, German poet and translator (died 1658)
- 1609 – Matthew Hale, Lord Chief Justice of England (died 1676)
- 1611 – François-Marie, comte de Broglie, Italian-French commander (died 1656)
- 1625 – Oliver Plunkett, Irish archbishop and saint (died 1681)
- 1636 – Nicolas Boileau-Despréaux, French poet and critic (died 1711)
- 1643 – John Strype, English priest, historian, and author (died 1737)
- 1661 – Florent Carton Dancourt, French actor and playwright (died 1725)
- 1661 – Louis, Grand Dauphin, heir apparent to the throne of France (died 1711)
- 1666 – James Sherard, English botanist and curator (died 1738)
- 1720 – Toussaint-Guillaume Picquet de la Motte, French admiral (died 1791)
- 1727 – Ivan Shuvalov, Russian art collector and philanthropist (died 1797)
- 1752 – Józef Zajączek, Polish general, politician (died 1826)
- 1757 – Antonio Canova, Italian sculptor and educator (died 1822)
- 1762 – Spencer Perceval, English lawyer and politician, Prime Minister of the United Kingdom (died 1812)
- 1769 – Garlieb Merkel, German author and activist (died 1850)
- 1778 – Gustav IV Adolf of Sweden (died 1837)
- 1782 – F. J. Robinson, 1st Viscount Goderich, English politician, Prime Minister of the United Kingdom (died 1859)
- 1808 – John Taylor, English-American religious leader, 3rd President of The Church of Jesus Christ of Latter-day Saints (died 1887)
- 1831 – Harry Atkinson, English-New Zealand politician, 10th Prime Minister of New Zealand (died 1892)
- 1838 – 11th Dalai Lama (died 1856)
- 1839 – Ahmed Muhtar Pasha, Ottoman general and politician, 227th Grand Vizier of the Ottoman Empire (died 1919)
- 1847 – Emma Albani, Canadian-English soprano and actress (died 1930)
- 1847 – Hiệp Hòa, Vietnamese emperor (died 1883)
- 1848 – Caroline Still Anderson, American physician, educator and abolitionist (died 1919)
- 1848 – Jules Bastien-Lepage, French painter (died 1884)
- 1849 – William Merritt Chase, American painter and educator (died 1916)
- 1850 – Mary Florence Potts, American businesswoman and inventor of the cold-handle sad iron (died 1922)
- 1859 – Charles Brantley Aycock, American educator, lawyer, and politician, 50th Governor of North Carolina (died 1912)
- 1862 – Johan Wagenaar, Dutch organist and composer (died 1941)
- 1864 – Princess Elisabeth of Hesse and by Rhine (died 1918)
- 1871 – Stephen Crane, American poet, novelist, and short story writer (died 1900)
- 1872 – Louis Dewis, Belgian-French painter (died 1946)
- 1877 – Roger Quilter, English composer (died 1953)
- 1878 – Konrad Mägi, Estonian painter and educator (died 1925)
- 1878 – Carlos Saavedra Lamas, Argentinian academic and politician, Nobel Prize laureate (died 1959)
- 1880 – Sholem Asch, Polish-American author and playwright (died 1957)
- 1880 – Grantland Rice, American journalist and poet (died 1954)
- 1880 – Alfred Wegener, German meteorologist and geophysicist (died 1930)
- 1881 – Perikles Ioannidis, Greek admiral (died 1965)
- 1886 – Hermann Broch, Austrian-American author and poet (died 1951)
- 1886 – Sakutarō Hagiwara, Japanese poet and critic (died 1942)
- 1887 – L.S. Lowry, English painter and illustrator (died 1976)
- 1888 – George Kenner, German-American painter and illustrator (died 1971)
- 1888 – Michał Sopoćko, Polish cleric and academic (died 1975)
- 1889 – Hannah Höch, German painter and photographer (died 1978)
- 1889 – Philip Noel-Baker, Baron Noel-Baker, English academic and politician, Secretary of State for Commonwealth Relations, Nobel Prize laureate (died 1982)
- 1896 – Edmund Blunden, English author, poet, and critic (died 1974)
- 1898 – Arthur Legat, Belgian race car driver (died 1960)
- 1898 – Sippie Wallace, American singer-songwriter and pianist (died 1986)

=== 1901–present ===
- 1902 – Nordahl Grieg, Norwegian journalist, author, poet, and playwright (died 1943)
- 1902 – Eugen Jochum, German conductor (died 1987)
- 1903 – Max Adrian, Irish-born British actor (died 1973)
- 1903 – Edward Greeves, Jr., Australian footballer (died 1963)
- 1904 – Laura LaPlante, American silent film actress (died 1996)
- 1905 – Paul-Émile Borduas, Canadian-French painter and educator (died 1960)
- 1906 – Johnny Indrisano, American boxer (died 1968)
- 1907 – Maxie Rosenbloom, American boxer (died 1976)
- 1909 – Hans Mork, South African-Australian rugby league player (died 1960)
- 1911 – Donald William Kerst, American Physicist who developed the betatron (died 1992)
- 1911 – Mingun Sayadaw, Burmese monk and scholar (died 1993)
- 1911 – Henri Troyat, French historian and author (died 2007)
- 1912 – Gunther Plaut, German-Canadian rabbi and author (died 2012)
- 1914 – Moshe Teitelbaum, Romanian-American rabbi (died 2006)
- 1915 – Margaret Taylor-Burroughs, American painter, poet, and educator, co-founded the DuSable Museum of African American History (died 2010)
- 1917 – Zenna Henderson, American author (died 1983)
- 1917 – Clarence E. Miller, American engineer and politician (died 2011)
- 1918 – Ken Miles, English-American race car driver (died 1966)
- 1919 – Hermann Bondi, English-Austrian mathematician and cosmologist (died 2005)
- 1920 – James J. Kilpatrick, American journalist and author (died 2010)
- 1920 – Ted Lowe, English sportscaster (died 2011)
- 1921 – John W. Peterson, American pilot and songwriter (died 2006)
- 1921 – Harald Quandt, German businessman (died 1967)
- 1922 – George S. Irving, American actor (died 2016)
- 1922 – Andy Tonkovich, American basketball player and coach (died 2006)
- 1923 – Victoria de los Ángeles, Spanish soprano and actress (died 2005)
- 1923 – Gordon R. Dickson, Canadian-American author (died 2001)
- 1923 – Carlos Páez Vilaró, Uruguayan painter and sculptor (died 2014)
- 1924 – Süleyman Demirel, Turkish engineer and politician, 9th President of Turkey (died 2015)
- 1924 – Jean-Luc Pépin, Canadian academic and politician, 19th Canadian Minister of Labour (died 1995)
- 1926 – Stephen Antonakos, Greek-American sculptor (died 2013)
- 1926 – Lou Donaldson, American saxophonist (died 2024)
- 1926 – Betsy Palmer, American actress and game show panelist (died 2015)
- 1927 – Edward Bronfman, Canadian businessman (co-owner of Montreal Canadiens, 1971-78) (died 2005)
- 1927 – Marcel Ophüls, German documentary filmmaker (died 2025)
- 1928 – James Bradford, American weightlifter (died 2013)
- 1929 – Nicholas Mavroules, American lawyer and politician (died 2003)
- 1931 – Yossef Gutfreund, Israeli wrestler and coach (died 1972)
- 1931 – Shunsuke Kikuchi, Japanese composer (died 2021)
- 1931 – Arne Pedersen, Norwegian footballer and manager (died 2013)
- 1932 – Al Arbour, Canadian ice hockey player and coach (died 2015)
- 1932 – Francis Arinze, Nigerian cardinal
- 1933 – Antoine Kohn, Luxembourgian footballer and manager (died 2012)
- 1934 – Umberto Agnelli, Swiss-Italian businessman and politician (died 2004)
- 1934 – William Mathias, Welsh pianist and composer (died 1992)
- 1935 – Gary Player, South African golfer and sportscaster
- 1935 – Edward Said, Palestinian-American theorist, author, and academic (died 2003)
- 1936 – Katsuhisa Hattori, Japanese composer and conductor (died 2020)
- 1936 – Shizuka Kamei, Japanese lawyer and politician
- 1937 – Bill Anderson, American country music singer-songwriter
- 1938 – Nicholasa Mohr, Puerto Rican American Nuyorican writer
- 1939 – Barbara Bosson, American actress (died 2023)
- 1940 – Roger Kellaway, American pianist and composer
- 1940 – Ramesh Chandra Lahoti, Indian lawyer and jurist, 35th Chief Justice of India (died 2022)
- 1941 – Joe Caldwell, American basketball player
- 1941 – Robert Foxworth, American actor and director
- 1942 – Larry Flynt, American publisher, founded Larry Flynt Publications (died 2021)
- 1942 – Ralph Klein, Canadian journalist and politician, 12th Premier of Alberta (died 2013)
- 1942 – Marcia Wallace, American actress and comedian (died 2013)
- 1943 – Salvatore Adamo, Italian-Belgian singer-songwriter
- 1943 – Jacques Attali, French economist and civil servant
- 1943 – Alfio Basile, Argentinian footballer and manager
- 1944 – Kinky Friedman, American singer-songwriter and author (died 2024)
- 1944 – Rafic Hariri, Lebanese businessman and politician 60th Prime Minister of Lebanon (died 2005)
- 1944 – Oscar Temaru, French-Polynesian soldier and politician, President of French Polynesia
- 1945 – Narendra Dabholkar, Indian author and activist, founded Maharashtra Andhashraddha Nirmoolan Samiti (died 2013)
- 1945 – John Williamson, Australian singer-songwriter
- 1946 – Yuko Shimizu, Japanese graphic designer, created Hello Kitty
- 1947 – Ted Hendricks, Guatemalan-American football player
- 1948 – Amani Abeid Karume, Zanzibar accountant and politician, 6th President of Zanzibar
- 1949 – Jeannie Berlin, American actress
- 1949 – David Foster, Canadian singer-songwriter, keyboard player, and producer
- 1949 – Michael D. Griffin, American physicist and engineer
- 1949 – Belita Moreno, American actress and acting coach
- 1950 – Mitch Kapor, American computer programmer and businessman, founded Lotus Development and Electronic Frontier Foundation
- 1950 – Robert B. Laughlin, American physicist and academic, Nobel Prize laureate
- 1951 – Fabrice Luchini, French actor and screenwriter
- 1951 – Craig Serjeant, Australian cricketer and chemist
- 1953 – Jan Davis, American engineer and astronaut
- 1957 – Lyle Lovett, American singer-songwriter, guitarist, and producer
- 1957 – Murray Pierce, New Zealand rugby player
- 1958 – Rachel Ticotin, American actress
- 1959 – Susanna Clarke, English author and educator
- 1960 – Tim Cook, American businessman and engineer, executive chairman of Apple Inc.
- 1960 – Fernando Valenzuela, Mexican baseball player, coach, and sportscaster (died 2024)
- 1961 – Louise Boije af Gennäs, Swedish author and screenwriter
- 1961 – Anne Donovan, American basketball player and coach (died 2018)
- 1961 – Heng Swee Keat, Singaporean politician
- 1962 – Sharron Davies, English swimmer
- 1962 – Magne Furuholmen, Norwegian singer-songwriter and guitarist
- 1962 – Anthony Kiedis, American singer-songwriter
- 1963 – Rick Allen, English musician
- 1963 – Nita Ambani, Indian businesswoman
- 1963 – Mark Hughes, Welsh footballer and manager
- 1963 – Big Kenny, American singer-songwriter and guitarist
- 1964 – Sophie B. Hawkins, American singer-songwriter and guitarist
- 1965 – Patrik Ringborg, Swedish conductor
- 1966 – Willie D, American rapper and entrepreneur
- 1966 – Mary Hansen, Australian singer and musician (died 2002)
- 1966 – Jeremy Hunt, English businessman and politician, Secretary of State for Health
- 1966 – Ashab Uddin, Indian-Bengali politician
- 1967 – Tina Arena, Australian singer-songwriter, producer, and actress
- 1967 – Carla van de Puttelaar, Dutch photographer
- 1969 – Gary Alexander, American basketball player
- 1969 – Tie Domi, Canadian ice hockey player and sportscaster
- 1970 – Sherwin Campbell, Barbadian cricketer
- 1970 – Toma Enache, Romanian film director
- 1972 – Toni Collette, Australian actress
- 1972 – Jenny McCarthy, American actress and model
- 1972 – Glen Murray, Canadian ice hockey player
- 1973 – David Berman, American actor
- 1973 – Aishwarya Rai, Indian model and actress
- 1974 – V. V. S. Laxman, Indian cricketer
- 1975 – Bo Bice, American singer and musician
- 1975 – Keryn Jordan, South African footballer (died 2013)
- 1975 – Megan Wing, Canadian figure skater and coach
- 1976 – Sergei Artyukhin, Russian-Belarusian wrestler (died 2012)
- 1976 – Bryan Harsin, American college football coach
- 1977 – Steve Hutchinson, American football player
- 1978 – Helen Czerski, English physicist and oceanographer
- 1978 – Danny Koevermans, Dutch footballer and manager
- 1978 – Jessica Valenti, American author
- 1979 – Coco Crisp, American baseball player
- 1979 – Milan Dudić, Serbian footballer
- 1979 – Alex Prager, American photographer and director
- 1980 – Bilgin Defterli, Turkish footballer
- 1981 – Matt Jones, American actor and comedian
- 1982 – Bradley Orr, English footballer
- 1982 – Warren Spragg, English-Italian rugby player
- 1983 – Matt Moulson, Canadian ice hockey player
- 1983 – Yuko Ogura, Japanese model and singer
- 1983 – Jon Wilkin, English rugby player
- 1984 – Miloš Krasić, Serbian footballer
- 1984 – Natalia Tena, English actress and musician
- 1984 – Stephen Vogt, American baseball player
- 1985 – Marcus Landry, American basketball player
- 1985 – Paulo Orlando, Brazilian baseball player
- 1986 – Penn Badgley, American actor and television personality
- 1986 – Ksenija Balta, Estonian high jumper, sprinter, and heptathlete
- 1987 – Ileana D'Cruz, Indian film actress
- 1987 – Bruce Irvin, American football player
- 1988 – Masahiro Tanaka, Japanese baseball player
- 1990 – Tim Frazier, American basketball player
- 1991 – Reece Brown, English footballer
- 1991 – Anthony Ramos, American actor and singer
- 1991 – Jiang Yuyuan, Chinese gymnast
- 1992 – Semaj Christon, American basketball player
- 1992 – Filip Kostić, Serbian footballer
- 1994 – Brent Rooker, American baseball player
- 1994 – James Ward-Prowse, English footballer
- 1995 – Joe Chealey, American basketball player
- 1995 – Margarita Mamun, Russian gymnast
- 1996 – GeorgeNotFound, English internet personality
- 1996 – Jeongyeon, South Korean singer
- 1996 – Chinanu Onuaku, American basketball player
- 1996 – Lil Peep, American rapper (died 2017)
- 1997 – Max Burkholder, American actor
- 1997 – Nordi Mukiele, French footballer
- 1997 – Elvis Rexhbeçaj, Kosovan footballer
- 1997 – Alex Wolff, American actor and musician
- 1998 – Stuart Skinner, Canadian ice hockey player
- 2000 – Gonzalo Plata, Ecuadorian footballer
- 2001 – Alofiana Khan-Pereira, Australian rugby league player
- 2002 – NLE Choppa, American rapper and YouTuber
- 2003 – Ernest Nuamah, Ghanaian footballer
- 2003 – Lautaro Rivero, Argentine footballer

== Deaths ==
=== Pre-1600 ===
- 934 – Beornstan of Winchester, English bishop
- 970 – Boso of Merseburg, German bishop
- 1038 – Herman I, Margrave of Meissen (born c. 980)
- 1296 – Guillaume Durand, French bishop and theologian (born 1230)
- 1319 – Uguccione della Faggiuola, Italian condottieri (born c. 1250)
- 1324 – John de Halton, Bishop of Carlisle
- 1391 – Amadeus VII, Count of Savoy (born 1360)
- 1399 – John IV of Brittany (born 1339)
- 1406 – Joanna, Duchess of Brabant (born 1322)
- 1423 – Nicholas Eudaimonoioannes, Byzantine diplomat (probable date)
- 1461 – David of Trebizond (born 1408)
- 1496 – Filippo Buonaccorsi (Filip Callimachus), Italian humanist writer (born 1437)
- 1546 – Giulio Romano, Italian painter and architect (born 1499)
- 1588 – Jean Daurat, French poet and scholar (born 1508)
- 1596 – Pierre Pithou, French lawyer and scholar (born 1539)

=== 1601–1900 ===
- 1629 – Hendrick ter Brugghen, Dutch painter (born 1588)
- 1642 – Jean Nicolet, French-Canadian explorer (born 1598)
- 1676 – Gisbertus Voetius, Dutch minister and theologian (born 1589)
- 1678 – William Coddington, American judge and politician, 1st Governor of Rhode Island (born 1601)
- 1700 – Charles II of Spain (born 1661)
- 1814 – Alexander Samoylov, Russian general and politician, Russian Minister of Justice (born 1744)
- 1888 – Nikolay Przhevalsky, Russian geographer and explorer (born 1838)
- 1894 – Alexander III of Russia (born 1845)

=== 1901–present ===
- 1903 – Theodor Mommsen, German archaeologist, journalist, and politician, Nobel Prize laureate (born 1817)
- 1907 – Alfred Jarry, French author and playwright (born 1873)
- 1920 – Kevin Barry, executed Irish Republican (born 1902)
- 1925 – Max Linder, French actor, director, screenwriter, producer and comedian (born 1883)
- 1938 – Charles Weeghman, American businessman (born 1874)
- 1942 – Hugo Distler, German organist, composer, and conductor (born 1908)
- 1952 – Dixie Lee, American singer (born 1911)
- 1955 – Dale Carnegie, American author and educator (born 1888)
- 1958 – Yahya Kemal Beyatlı, Turkish poet, author, and diplomat (born 1884)
- 1962 – Ricardo Rodríguez, Mexican race car driver (born 1942)
- 1961 – Livia Gouverneur, Venezuelan communist (born 1941)
- 1968 – Georgios Papandreou, Greek economist and politician, 134th Prime Minister of Greece (born 1888)
- 1970 – Robert Staughton Lynd, American sociologist and academic (born 1892)
- 1972 – Waldemar Hammenhög, Swedish author (born 1902)
- 1972 – Robert MacArthur, Canadian-American ecologist and academic (born 1930)
- 1972 – Ezra Pound, American poet and critic (born 1885)
- 1982 – James Broderick, American actor and director (born 1927)
- 1982 – King Vidor, American director, producer, and screenwriter (born 1894)
- 1983 – Anthony van Hoboken, Dutch-Swiss musicologist and author (born 1887)
- 1984 – Norman Krasna, American director, producer, and screenwriter (born 1909)
- 1985 – Arnold Pihlak, Estonian-English footballer (born 1902)
- 1985 – Phil Silvers, American actor and comedian (born 1911)
- 1986 – Serge Garant, Canadian composer and conductor (born 1929)
- 1987 – Vasso Devetzi, Greek pianist (born 1927)
- 1987 – René Lévesque, Canadian journalist and politician, 23rd Premier of Quebec (born 1922)
- 1993 – Severo Ochoa, Spanish-American biochemist and academic, Nobel Prize laureate (born 1905)
- 1993 – A. N. Sherwin-White, English historian and scholar (born 1911)
- 1994 – Noah Beery, Jr., American actor (born 1913)
- 1996 – J. R. Jayewardene, Sri Lankan lawyer and politician, 2nd President of Sri Lanka (born 1906)
- 1999 – Theodore Hall, American physicist and spy (born 1925)
- 1999 – Walter Payton, American football player and race car driver (born 1954)
- 2000 – George Armstrong, English footballer and manager (born 1944)
- 2004 – Mac Dre, American rapper and producer, founded Thizz Entertainment (born 1970)
- 2004 – Terry Knight, American singer-songwriter and producer (born 1943)
- 2005 – Skitch Henderson, American pianist, composer, and conductor (born 1918)
- 2005 – Michael Piller, American screenwriter and producer (born 1948)
- 2006 – Adrienne Shelly, American actress, director, and screenwriter (born 1966)
- 2006 – William Styron, American novelist and essayist (born 1925)
- 2007 – S. Ali Raza, Indian director and screenwriter (born 1922)
- 2007 – Paul Tibbets, American general (born 1915)
- 2008 – Jacques Piccard, Swiss oceanographer and engineer (born 1922)
- 2008 – Shakir Stewart, American record producer (born 1974)
- 2008 – Yma Sumac, Peruvian-American soprano and actress (born 1922/1923)
- 2009 – Esther Hautzig, Lithuanian-American author (born 1930)
- 2009 – Endel Laas, Estonian scientist and academic (born 1915)
- 2009 – Robert H. Rines, American violinist and composer (born 1922)
- 2010 – Shannon Tavarez, American actress (born 1999)
- 2010 – Diana Wellesley, Duchess of Wellington (born 1922)
- 2011 – Cahit Aral, Turkish engineer and politician, Turkish Minister of Industry and Commerce (born 1927)
- 2012 – Agustín García Calvo, Spanish poet, playwright, and philosopher (born 1926)
- 2012 – Mitch Lucker, American singer (born 1984)
- 2012 – Pascual Pérez, Dominican baseball player (born 1957)
- 2013 – John Y. McCollister, American lieutenant and politician (born 1921)
- 2013 – Piet Rietveld, Dutch economist and academic (born 1952)
- 2014 – Joel Barnett, Baron Barnett, English accountant and politician, Chief Secretary to the Treasury (born 1923)
- 2014 – Jackie Fairweather, Australian runner and coach (born 1967)
- 2014 – Abednigo Ngcobo, South African footballer (born 1950)
- 2014 – Jean-Pierre Roy, Canadian-American baseball player, manager, and sportscaster (born 1920)
- 2014 – Wayne Static, American singer-songwriter and guitarist (born 1965)
- 2015 – Thomas R. Fitzgerald, American lawyer and judge (born 1941)
- 2015 – Houston McTear, American sprinter (born 1957)
- 2015 – Charles Duncan Michener, American entomologist and academic (born 1918)
- 2015 – Günter Schabowski, German journalist and politician (born 1929)
- 2015 – Fred Thompson, American actor, lawyer, and politician (born 1942)
- 2020 – Keith Hitchins, American historian expert on Romanian history (born 1931)
- 2020 – Lady Elizabeth Shakerley, British party planner, writer and socialite (born 1941)
- 2021 – Hugo Dittfach, Canadian horse jockey (born 1936)
- 2022 – Takeoff, member of the American hip-hop group Migos (born 1994)
- 2023 – Brian Brain, English cricketer (born 1940)
- 2025 – Martha Layne Collins, American politician, 56th Governor of Kentucky (born 1936)
- 2025 – John Farragher, Australian rugby league player (born 1957)
- 2025 – Carlos Manzo, Mexican politician (born 1985)
- 2026 – Ate Gay, Filipino comedian and television host (born 1971)

== Holidays and observances ==
- All Saints' Day, a holy day of obligation in some areas (a national holiday in many historically Catholic countries), and its related observance:
  - Day of the Innocents, the first day of Day of the Dead or El Dia de los Muertos celebration (Mexico, Haiti)
- Anniversary of the Revolution (Algeria)
- Chavang Kut (Mizo people of Northeast India, Bangladesh, Burma)
- Chhattisgarh Rajyotsava (Chhattisgarh, India)
- Christian feast day:
  - Austromoine
  - Benignus of Dijon
  - Caesarius of Africa
  - Blessed Rupert Mayer
  - Santa Muerte (Folk Catholicism, Mexico and Southwestern United States)
  - November 1 (Eastern Orthodox liturgics)
- Coronation of the fifth Druk Gyalpo (Bhutan)
- Independence Day, celebrates the independence of Antigua and Barbuda from the United Kingdom in 1981.
- Karnataka Rajyotsava (Karnataka, India)
- Kerala Day (Kerala, India)
- Liberty Day (United States Virgin Islands)
- International Lennox-Gastaut Syndrome Awareness Day
- National Brush Day (United States)
- Self-Defense Forces Commemoration Day (Japan)
- The first day of winter observances:
  - Calan Gaeaf, celebrations start at sunset of October 31. (Wales)
  - Samhain in the Northern Hemisphere and Beltane in the Southern Hemisphere, celebrations start at sunset of October 31 (Neopagan Wheel of the Year)
- World Vegan Day
