= Clothes iron =

Tool for smoothing cloth using heat and pressure

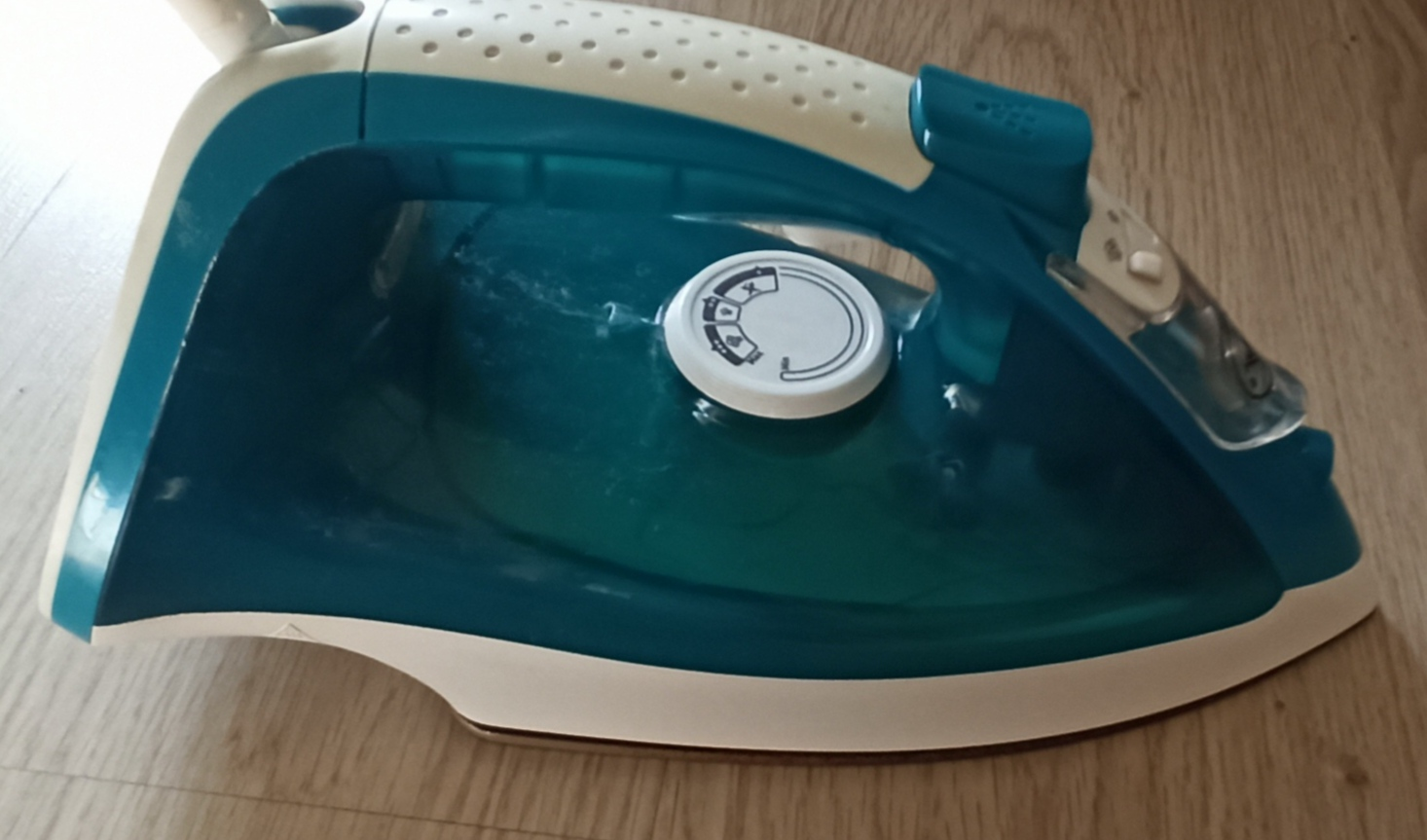
Modern electric steam iron

A clothes iron, also known as a flatiron, smoothing iron, dry iron, steam iron, and simply iron, is a small appliance that, when heated, is used to press clothes to remove wrinkles and unwanted creases. Domestic irons generally range in operating temperature from 121 °C (250 °F) to 182 °C (360 °F). It is named for the metal (iron) of which the device was historically made, its use is generally called ironing, the final step in the process of laundering clothes.

Ironing works by loosening the ties between the long chains of molecules that exist in polymer fiber materials. With the heat and the weight of the ironing plate, the fibers are stretched and the fabric maintains its new shape when cool. Some materials, such as cotton, require the use of water to loosen the intermolecular bonds.

== History and development ==
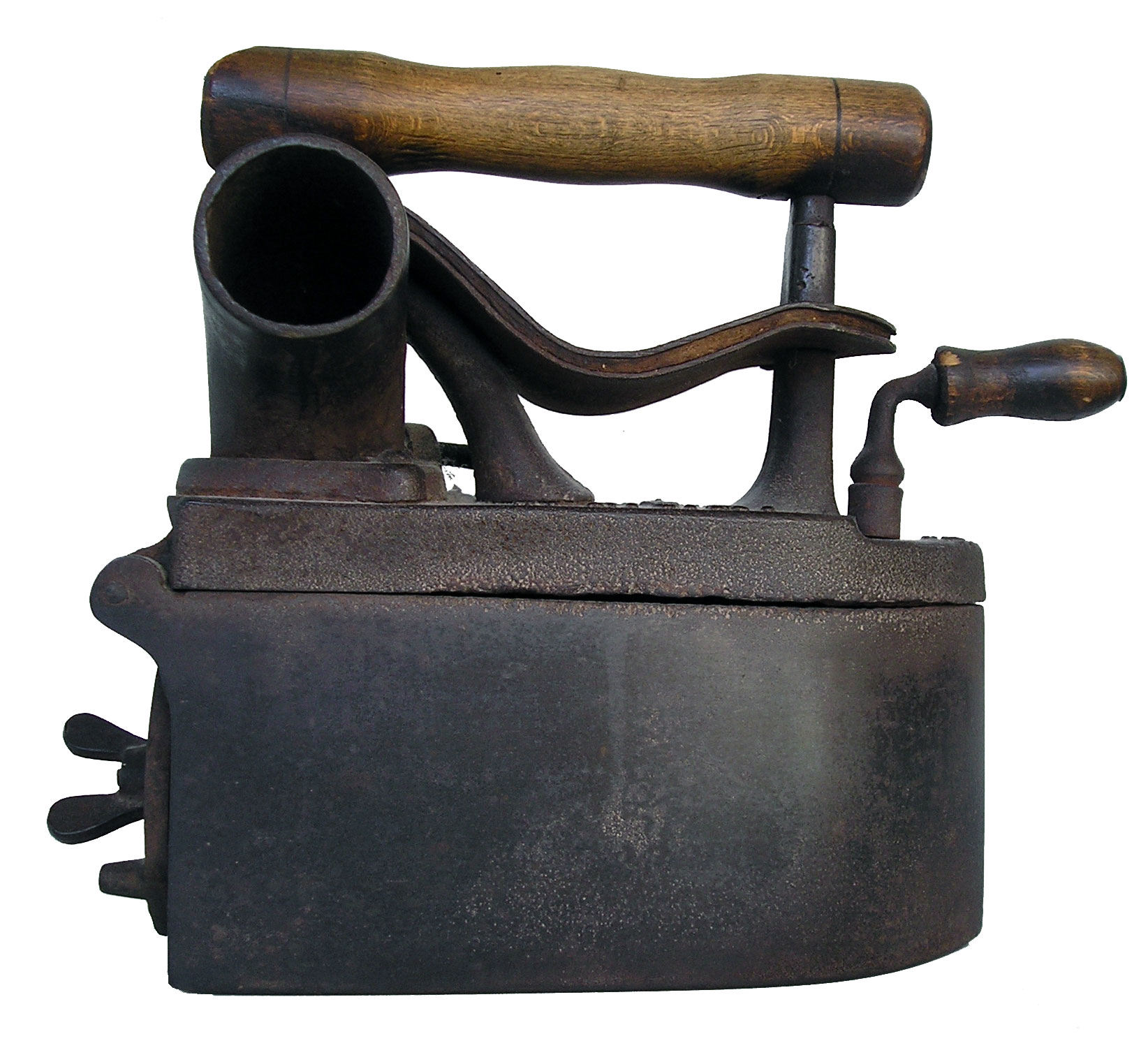
A charcoal iron

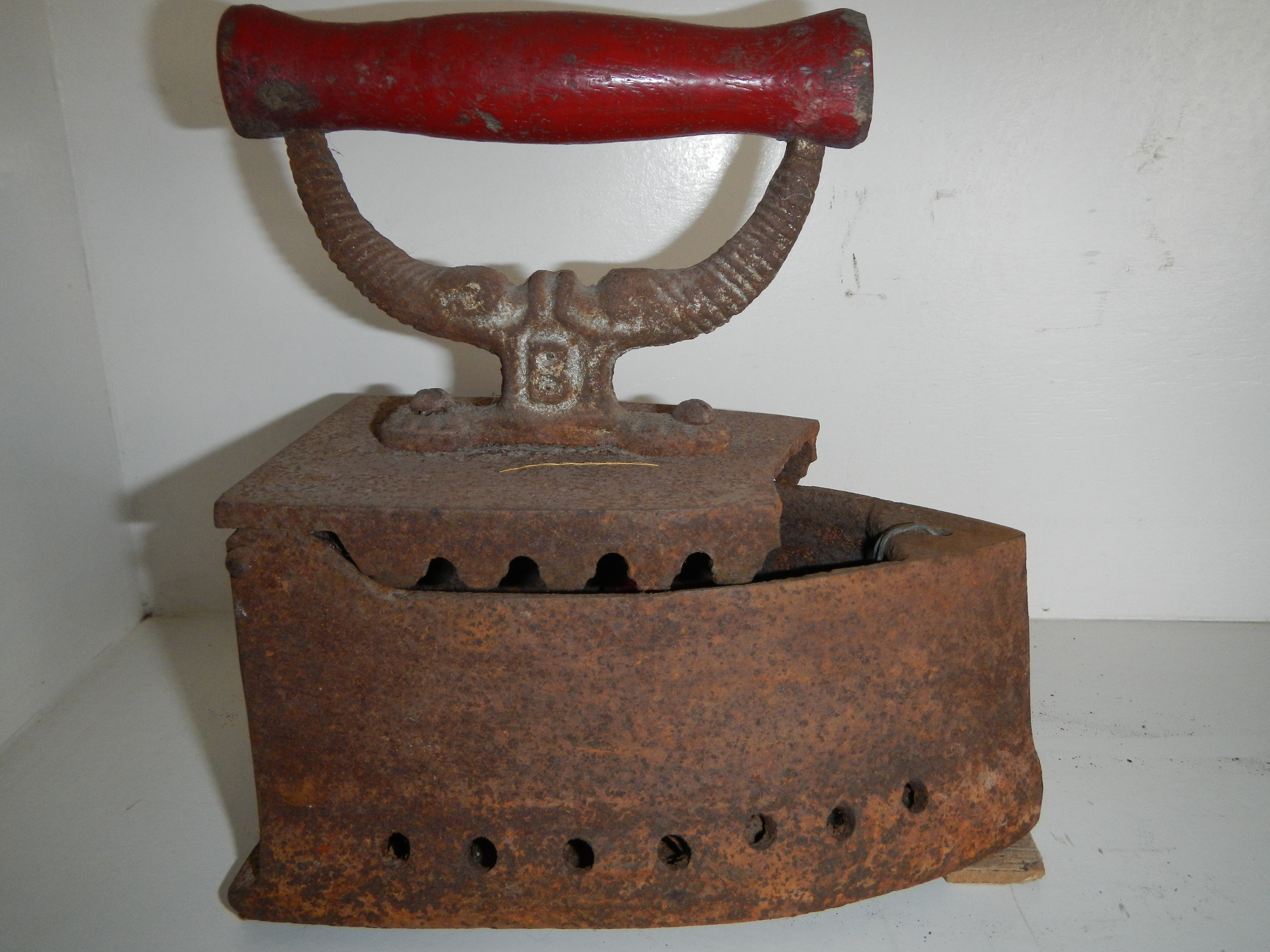
Box iron (Minalin, Pampanga, Philippines Museum).

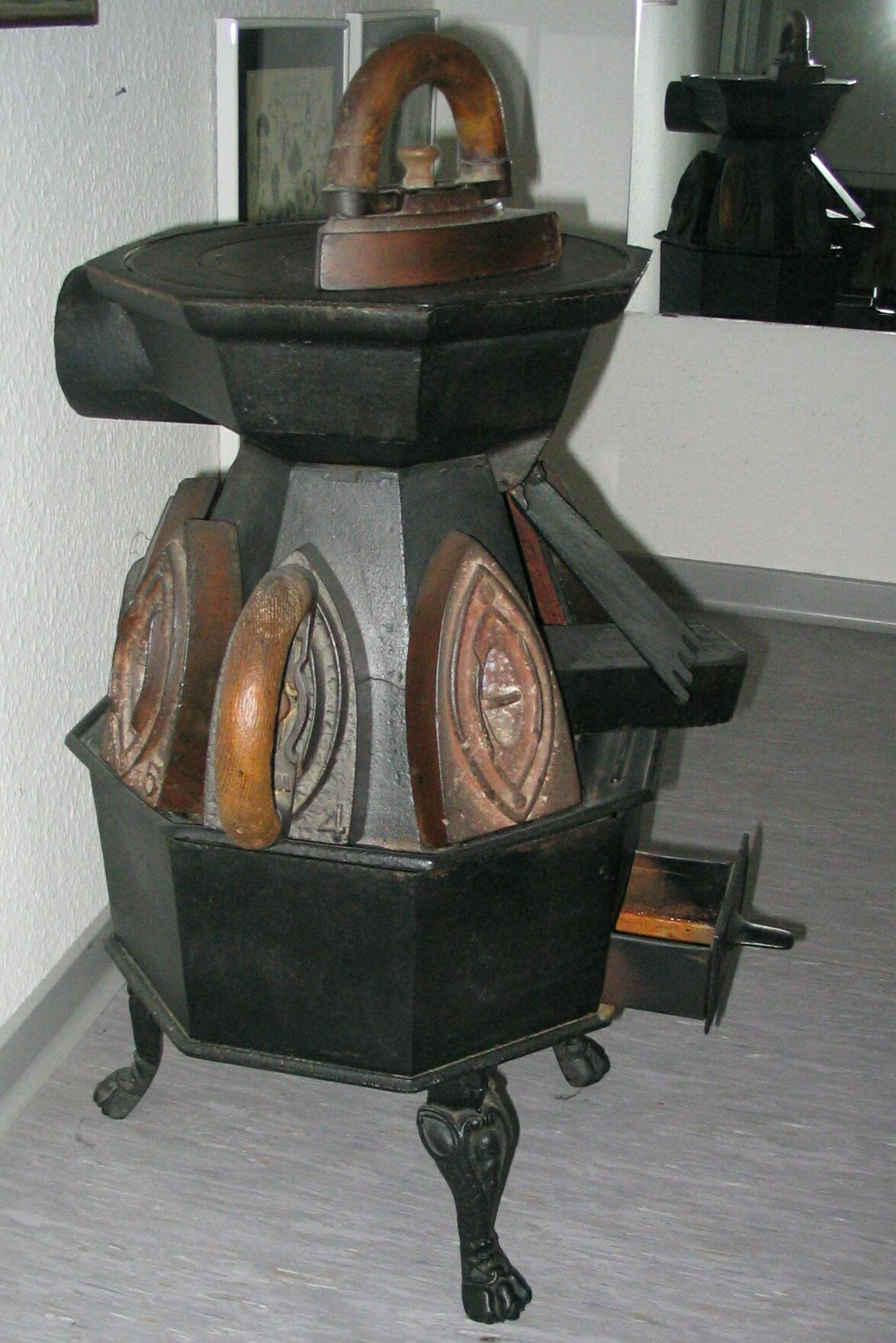
Flat iron stove

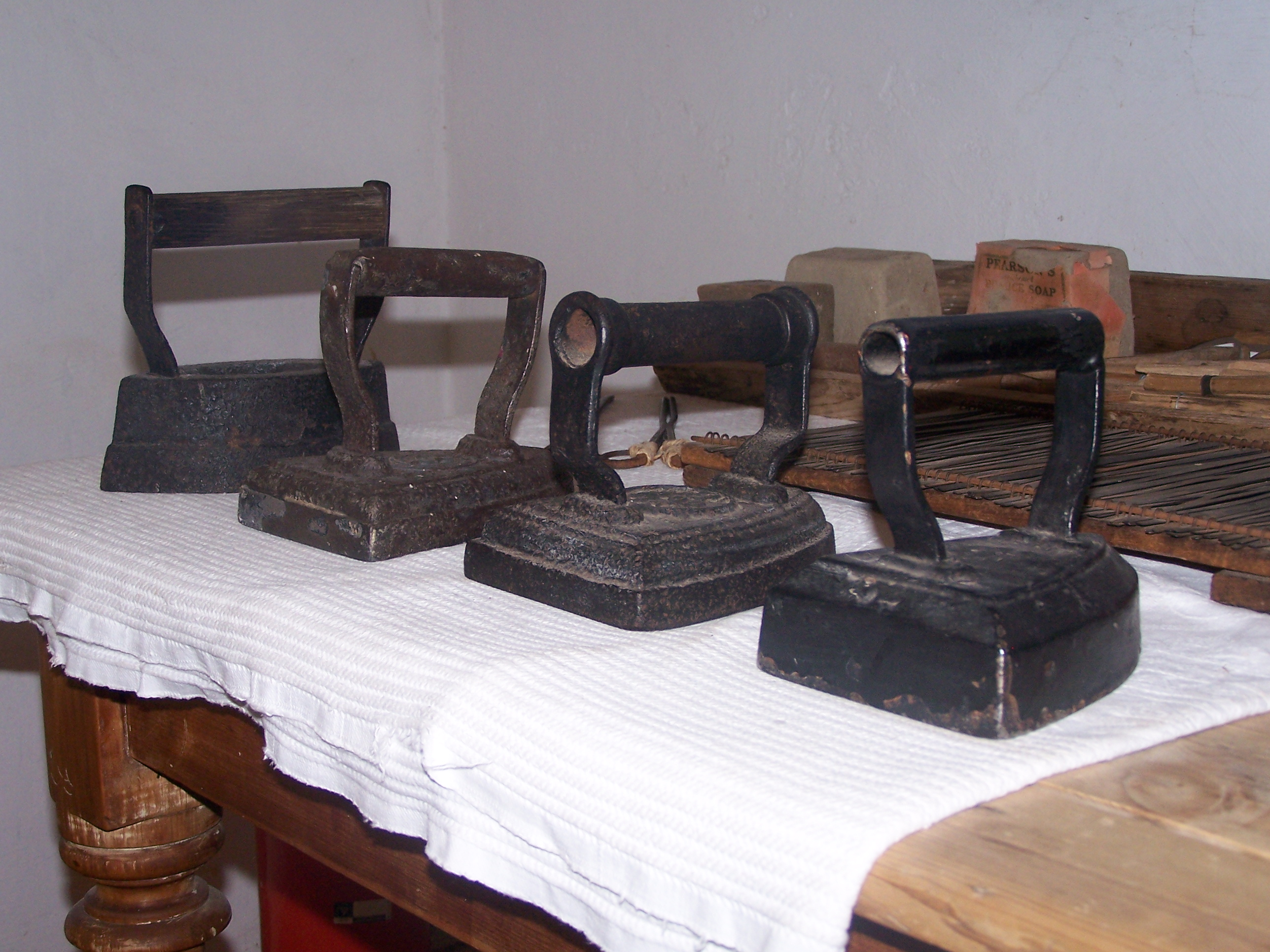
Typical English flat irons of the 1800s (Collection Tranby House, Australia). The shape was used by Victorian antiquarians to describe a style of medieval shield, termed by analogy heater shield.

Before the introduction of electricity, irons were heated by combustion, either in a fire or with some internal arrangement. The iron was made as a solid piece of iron with a handle and was heated, for example, on a wood stove and used to smooth clothes. It can also be called a smoothing iron. An "electric flatiron" was invented by American Henry W. Seely and patented on June 6, 1882. It weighed almost 15 pounds (6.8 kg) and took a long time to heat. The UK Electricity Association is reported to have said that an electric iron with a carbon arc appeared in France in 1880, but this is considered doubtful.

Two of the oldest sorts of iron were either containers filled with a burning substance, or solid lumps of metal which could be heated directly.

Metal pans filled with hot coals were used for smoothing fabrics in China in the 1st century BC. A later design consisted of an iron box which could be filled with hot coals, which had to be periodically aerated by attaching a bellows. In the late nineteenth and early twentieth centuries, there were many irons in use that were heated by fuels such as kerosene, ethanol, whale oil, natural gas, carbide gas (acetylene, as with carbide lamps), or even gasoline. Some houses were equipped with a system of pipes for distributing natural gas or carbide gas to different rooms in order to operate appliances such as irons, in addition to lights. Despite the risk of fire, liquid-fuel irons were sold in U.S. rural areas up through World War II. In Kerala, India, burning coconut shells were traditionally used as an alternative to charcoal due to their comparable heating capacity. This method is still employed as a backup option, particularly during frequent power outages. Other box irons had heated metal inserts instead of hot coals.

From the 17th century, sadirons or sad irons (from Middle English "sad", meaning "solid", used in English through the 1800s) began to be used. They were thick slabs of cast iron, triangular and with a handle, heated in a fire or on a stove. These were also called flat irons. A laundry worker would employ a cluster of solid irons that were heated from a single source: As the iron currently in use cooled down, it could be quickly replaced by a hot one.

In the industrialized world, these designs have been superseded by the electric iron, which uses resistive heating from an electric current. The hot plate, called the sole plate, is made of aluminium or stainless steel polished to be as smooth as possible; it is sometimes coated with a low-friction heat-resistant plastic to reduce friction below that of the metal plate. The heating element is controlled by a thermostat that switches the current on and off to maintain the selected temperature. The invention of the resistively heated electric iron is credited to Henry W. Seeley of New York City in 1882. In the same year an iron heated by a carbon arc was introduced in France, but was too dangerous to be successful. The early electric irons had no easy way to control their temperature, and the first thermostatically controlled electric iron appeared in the 1920s. The first commercially available electric steam iron was introduced in 1926 by a New York drying and cleaning company, Eldec, but was not a commercial success. The patent for an electric steam iron and dampener was issued to Max Skolnik of Chicago in 1934. In 1938, Skolnik granted the Steam-O-Matic Corporation of New York the exclusive right to manufacture steam-electric irons. This was the first steam iron to achieve any degree of popularity, and led the way to more widespread use of the electric steam iron during the 1940s and 1950s.

=== Types and names ===
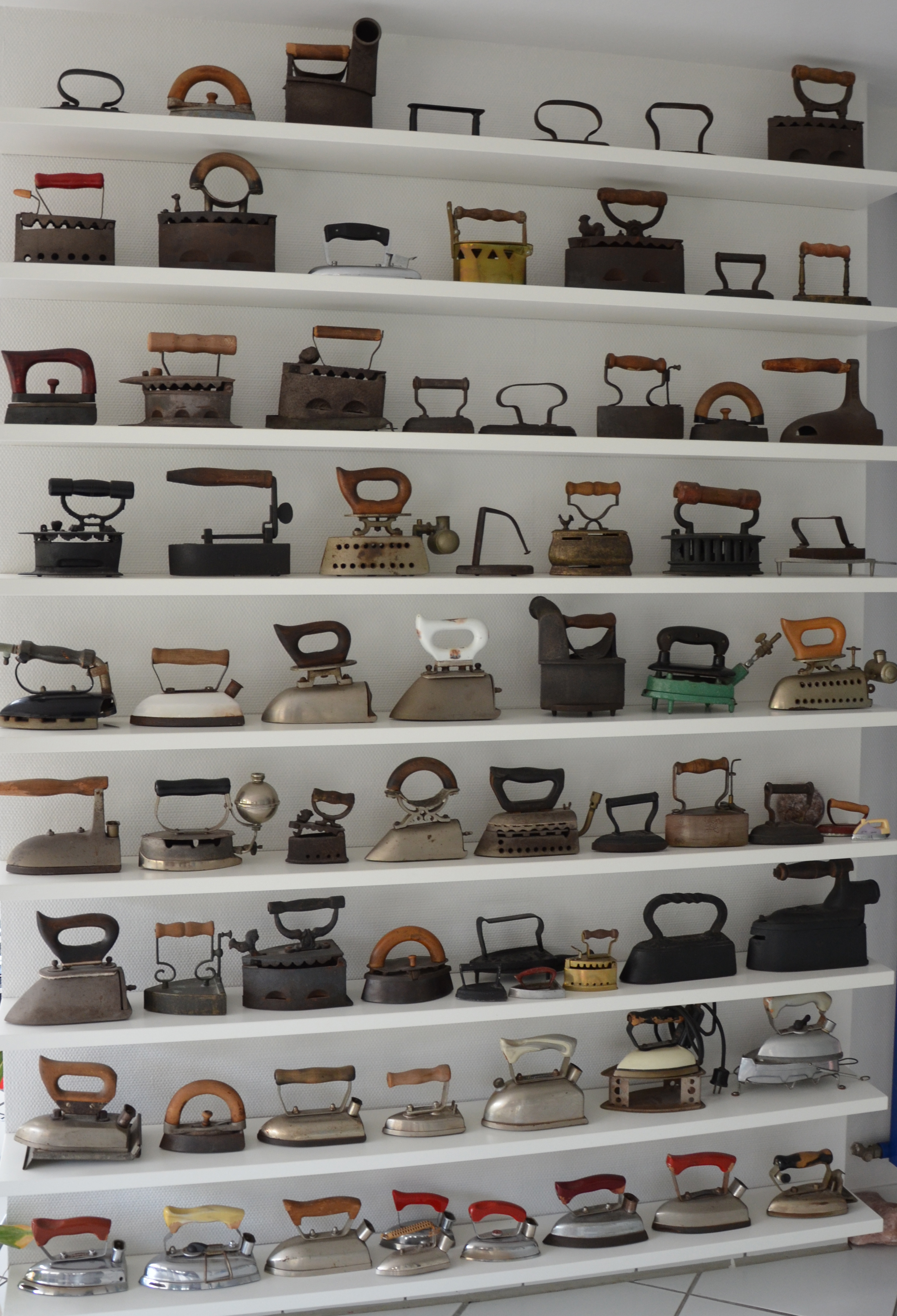
Iron collection

Historically, irons have had several variations and have thus been called by many names:

- Flatiron (American English), flat iron (British English) or smoothing iron

The general name for a hand-held iron consisting simply of a handle and a solid, flat, metal base, and named for the flat ironing face used to smooth clothes.

- Sad iron or sadiron

Mentioned above, meaning "solid" or heavy iron, where the base is a solid block of metal, sometimes used to refer to irons with heavier bases than a typical "flatiron".

- Box iron, ironing box, charcoal iron, ox-tongue iron or slug iron

Mentioned above; the base is a container, into which hot coals or a metal brick or slug can be inserted to keep the iron heated. The ox-tongue iron is named for the particular shape of the insert, referred to as an ox-tongue slug.

- Goose, tailor's goose or, in Scots, gusing iron

A type of flat iron or sad iron named for the goose-like curve in its neck, and (in the case of "tailor's goose") its usage by tailors.

- Goffering iron

This type of iron, now obsolete, consists of a metal cylinder oriented horizontally on a stand. It was used to iron ruffs and collars.

== Hygiene ==
The World Health Organization recommends ironing clothes to kill body lice and nits hiding in the seams of the fabric, when modern washing machines and dryers are unavailable.

== Features ==
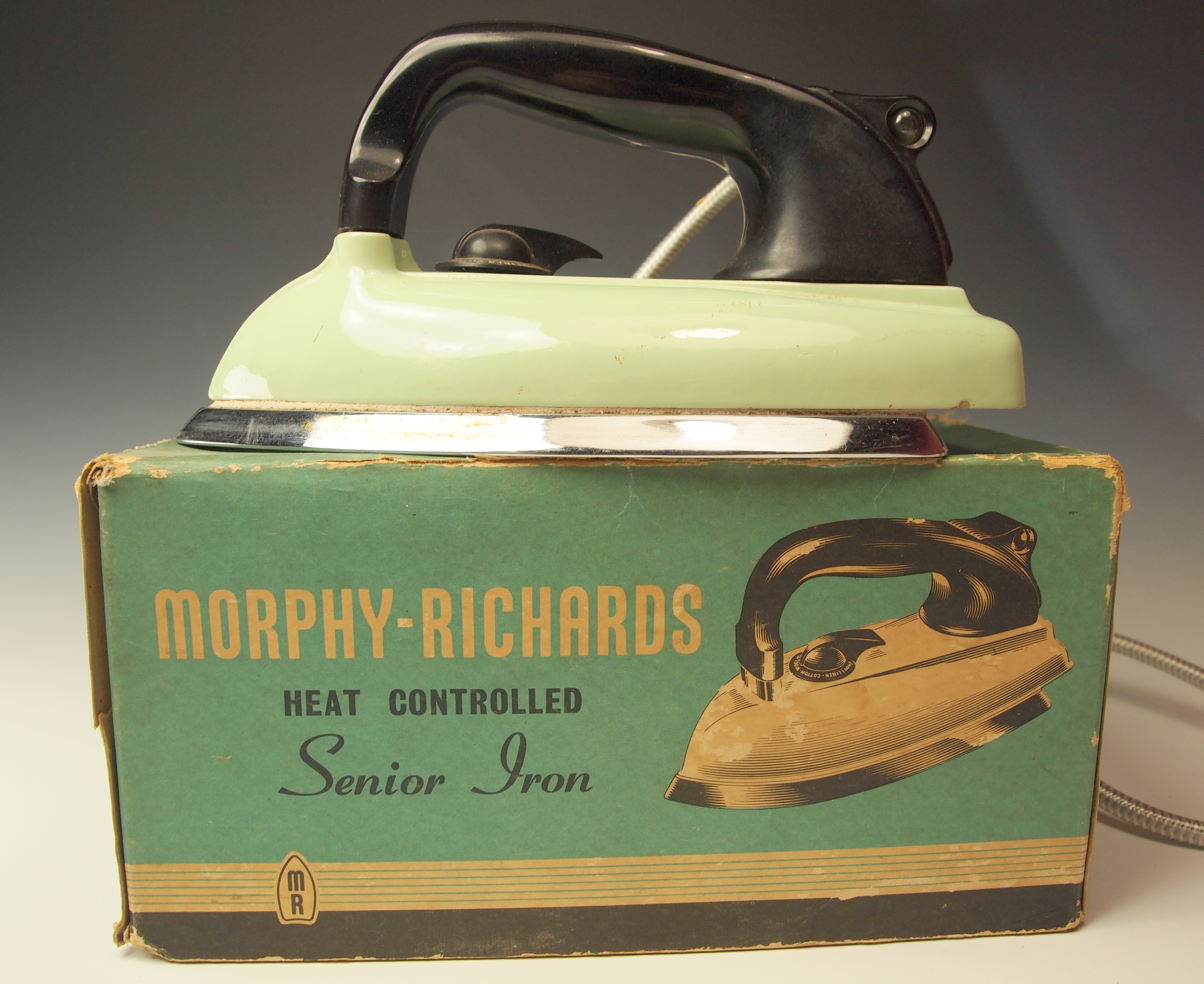
A 1950s Morphy Richards electric iron with original box

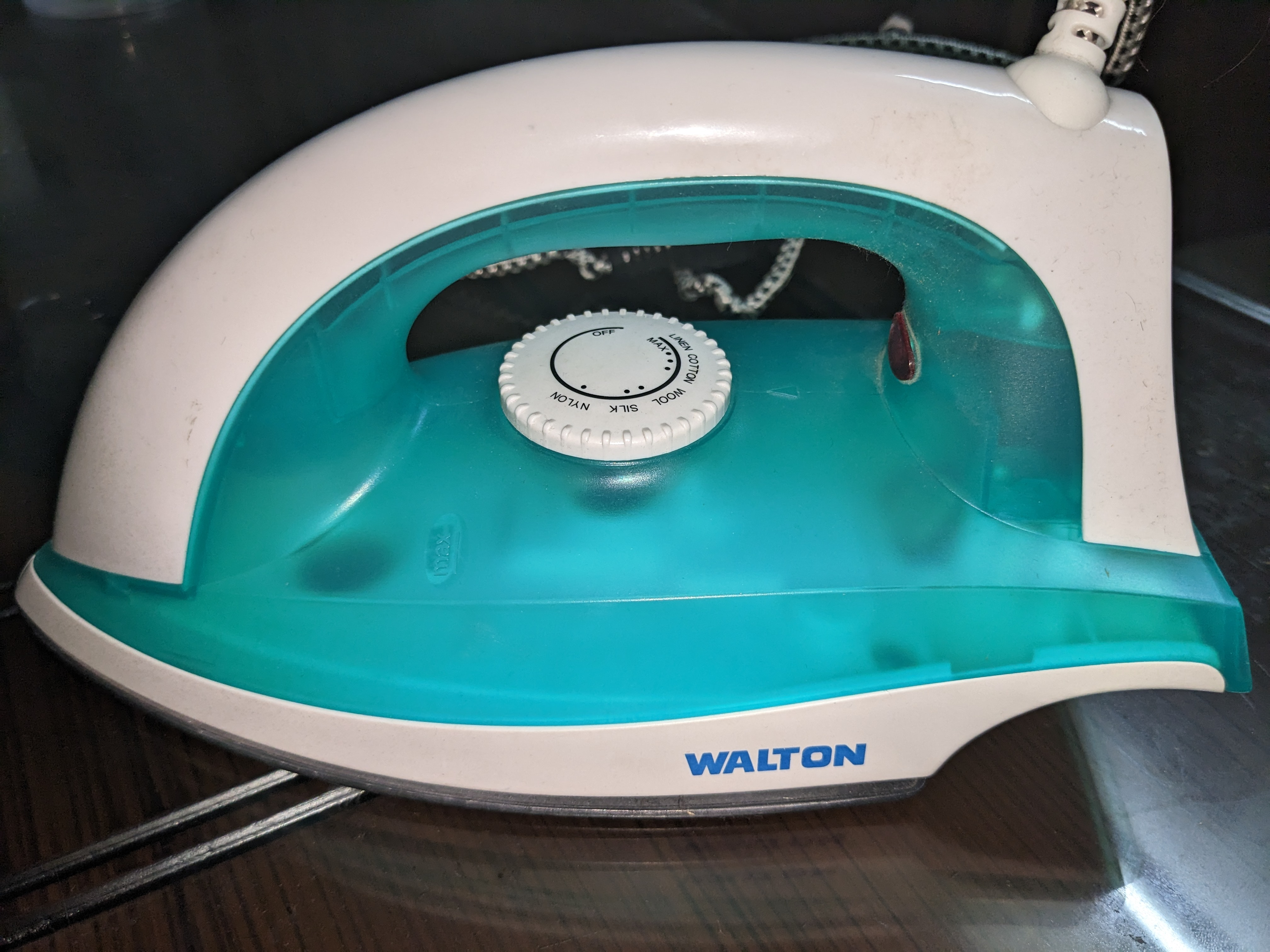
A Walton electric iron with temperature control dial

Modern irons for home use can have the following features:

- A design that allows the iron to be set down, usually standing on its end, without the hot soleplate touching anything that could be damaged;
- A thermostat ensuring maintenance of a constant temperature;
- A temperature control dial allowing the user to select the operating temperatures (usually marked with types of cloth rather than temperatures: "silk", "wool", "cotton", "linen", etc.);
- An electrical cord with heat-resistant silicone rubber insulation;
- Injection of steam through the fabric during the ironing process;
  - A water reservoir inside the iron used for steam generation;
  - An indicator showing the amount of water left in the reservoir,
  - Constant steam: constantly sends steam through the hot part of the iron into the clothes;
  - Steam burst: sends a burst of steam through the clothes when the user presses a button;
  - (advanced feature) Dial controlling the amount of steam to emit as a constant stream;
  - (advanced feature) Anti-drip system;
- Cord control: the point at which the cord attaches to the iron has a spring to hold the cord out of the way while ironing and likewise when setting down the iron (prevents fires, is more convenient, etc.);
- A retractable cord for easy storage;
- (advanced feature) non-stick coating along the sole plate to help the iron glide across the fabric
- (advanced feature) Anti-burn control: if the iron is left flat (possibly touching clothes) for too long, the iron shuts off to prevent scorching and fires;
- (advanced feature) Energy saving control: if the iron is left undisturbed for several (10 or 15) minutes, the iron shuts off.
- Cordless irons: the iron is placed on a stand for a short period to warm up, using thermal mass to stay hot for a short period. These are useful for light loads only. Battery power is not viable for irons as they require more power than practical batteries can provide.
- (advanced feature) 3-way automatic shut-off
- (advanced feature) self-cleaning
- (advanced feature) Anti-scale to help remove lime scale buildup from using hard water for a long time.
- (advanced feature) vertical steam to help remove creases and wrinkles by holding an iron vertically and steaming material close to it.

== Collections ==
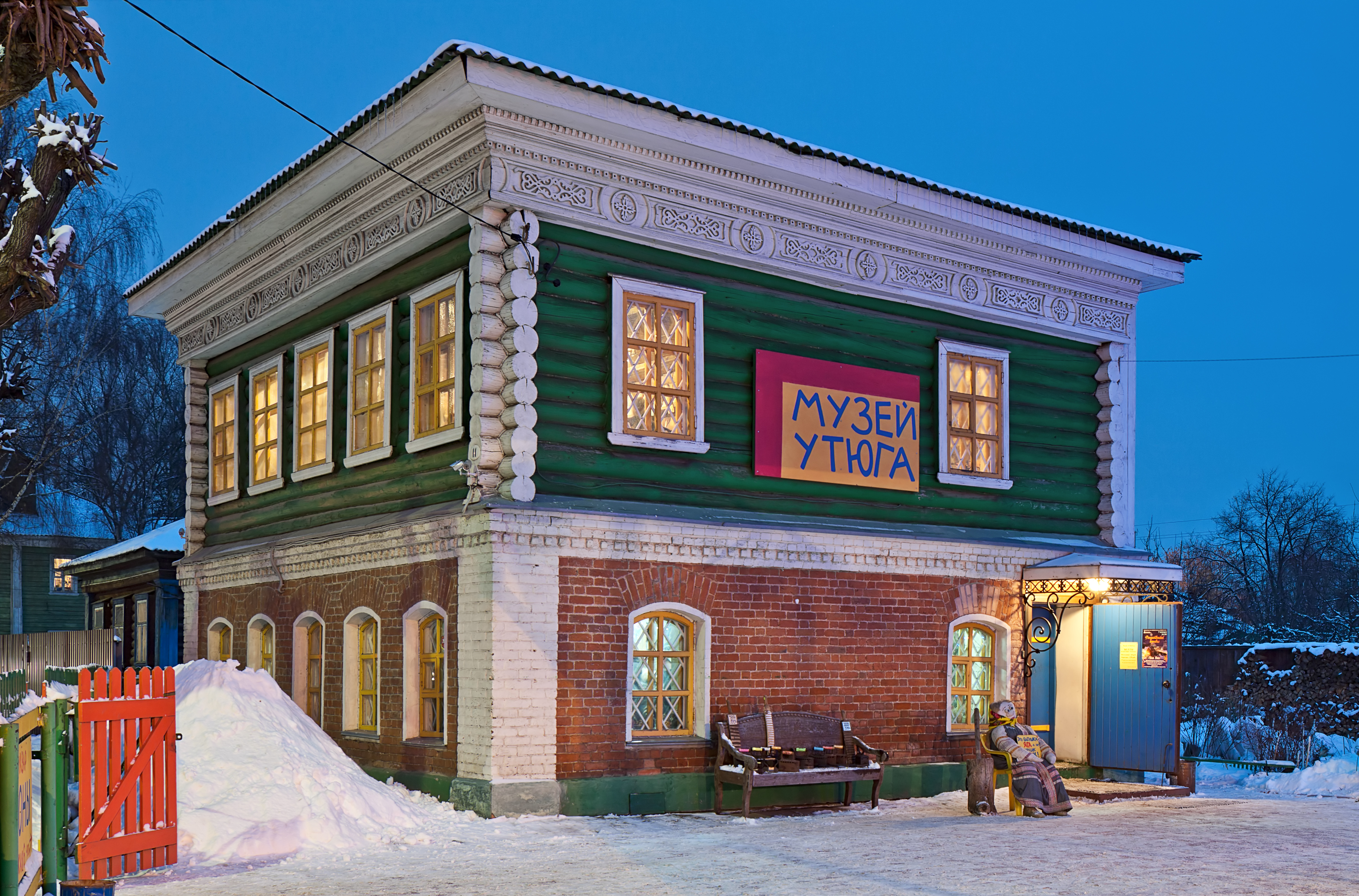
Clothes iron museum in Pereslavl, Russia

One of the world's larger collection of irons, comprising 1300 historical examples of irons from Germany and the rest of the world, is housed in Gochsheim Castle, near Karlsruhe, Germany.

Many ethnographical museums around the world have collections of irons. In Ukraine, for example, about 150 irons are the part of the exhibition of the Radomysl Castle in Ukraine.

== Ironing center ==
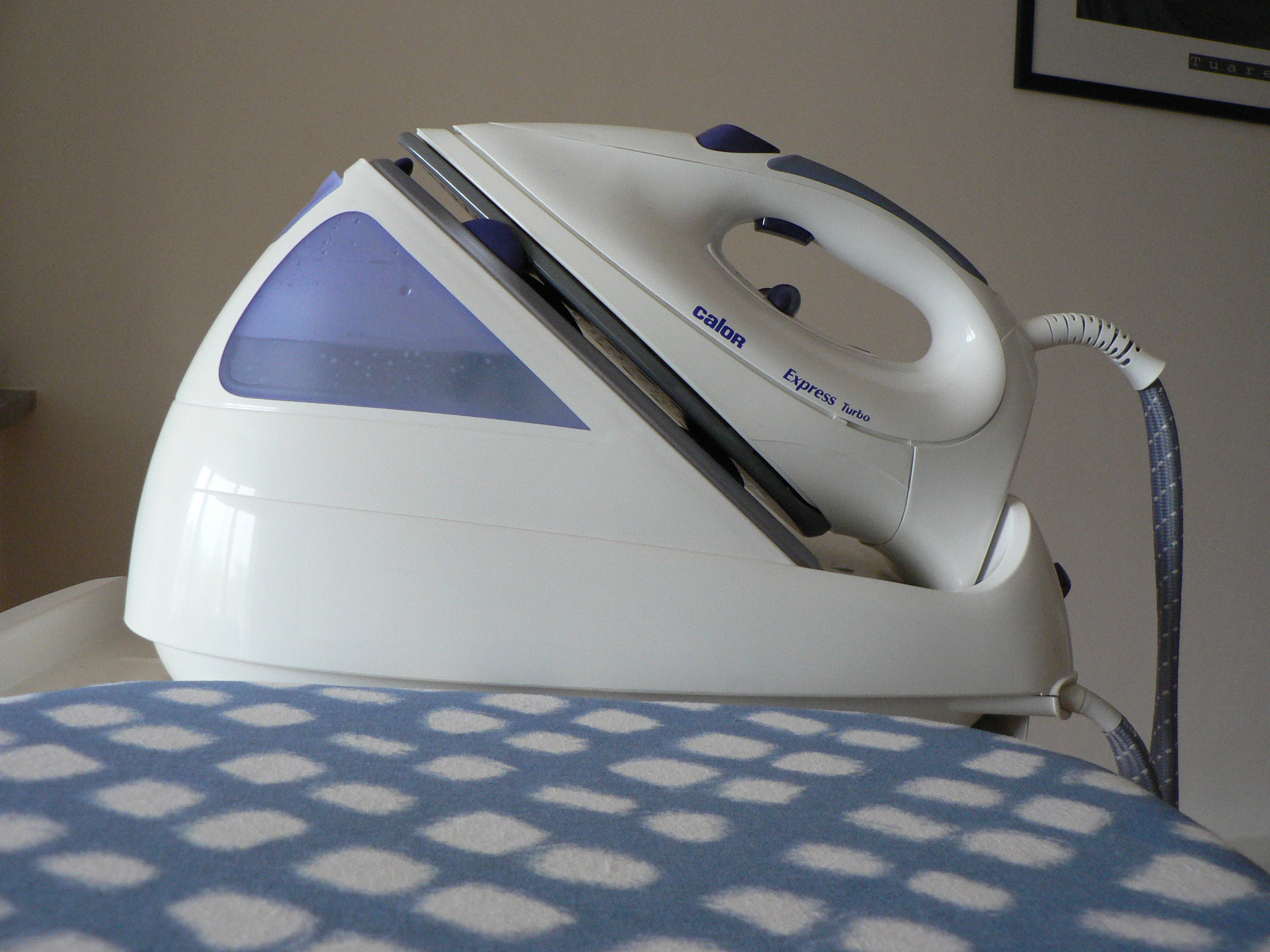
Ironing center with the separate tank visible

An ironing center, steam ironing station, or steam generator iron is a device consisting of a clothes iron and a separate steam-generating tank. By having a separate tank, the ironing unit can generate more steam than a conventional iron, making steam ironing faster. Such ironing facilities take longer to warm up than conventional irons, and cost more.

== See also ==
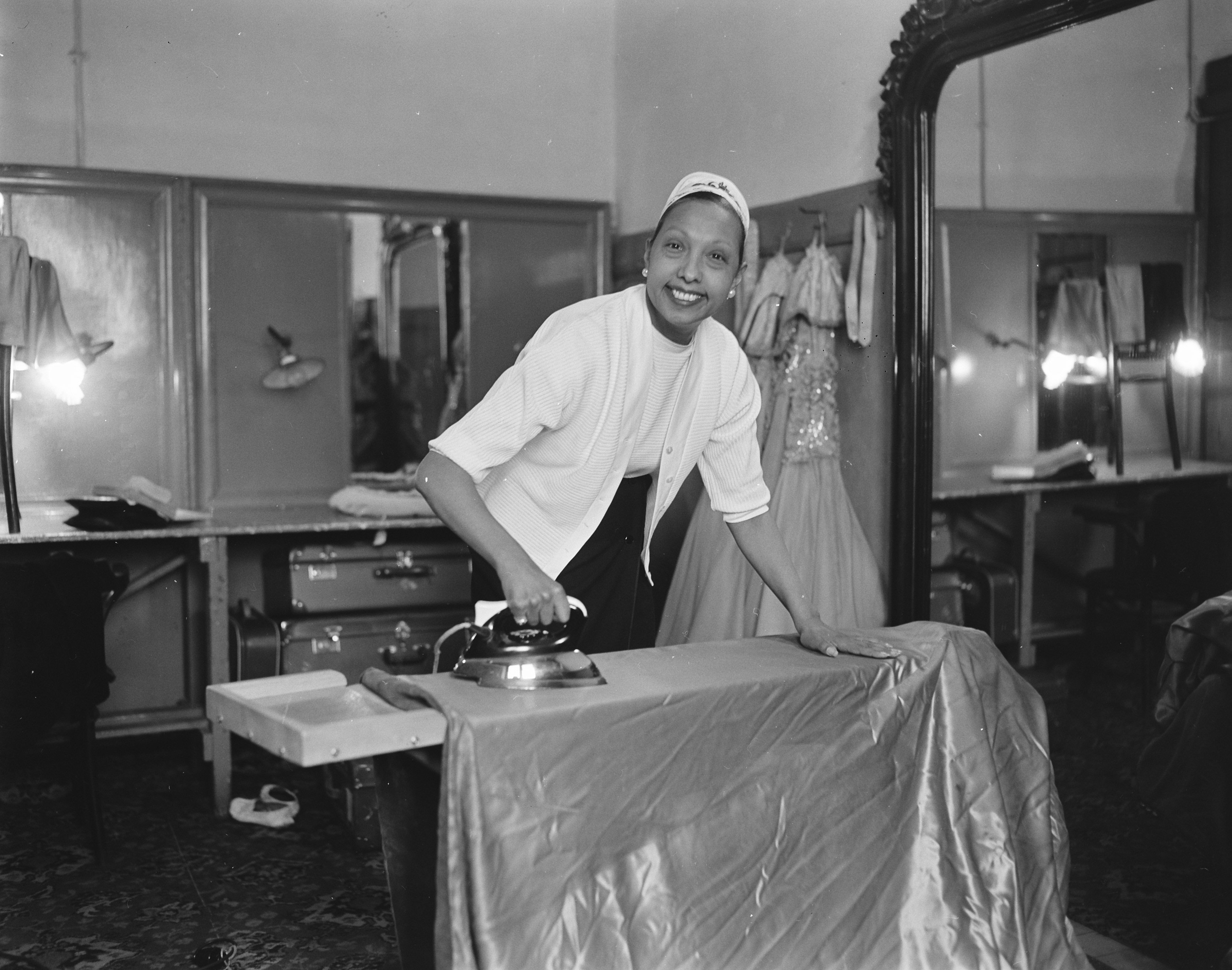
Josephine Baker ironing (1956)

- Dadeumi, a mechanical way to smooth clothing, once traditional in Korea
- Extreme ironing, ironing as a competitive sport
- Flatiron Building, of cross-section like a flatiron
- Flatiron gunboat, flatiron-shaped in plan view
- Hair iron
- Home robot
- Mangle (machine)
- Soldering iron
- Trouser press
- Mary Florence Potts, inventor of the detachable cold wooden handle for irons
