= National Brush Day =

Holiday to raise awareness of oral health after Halloween

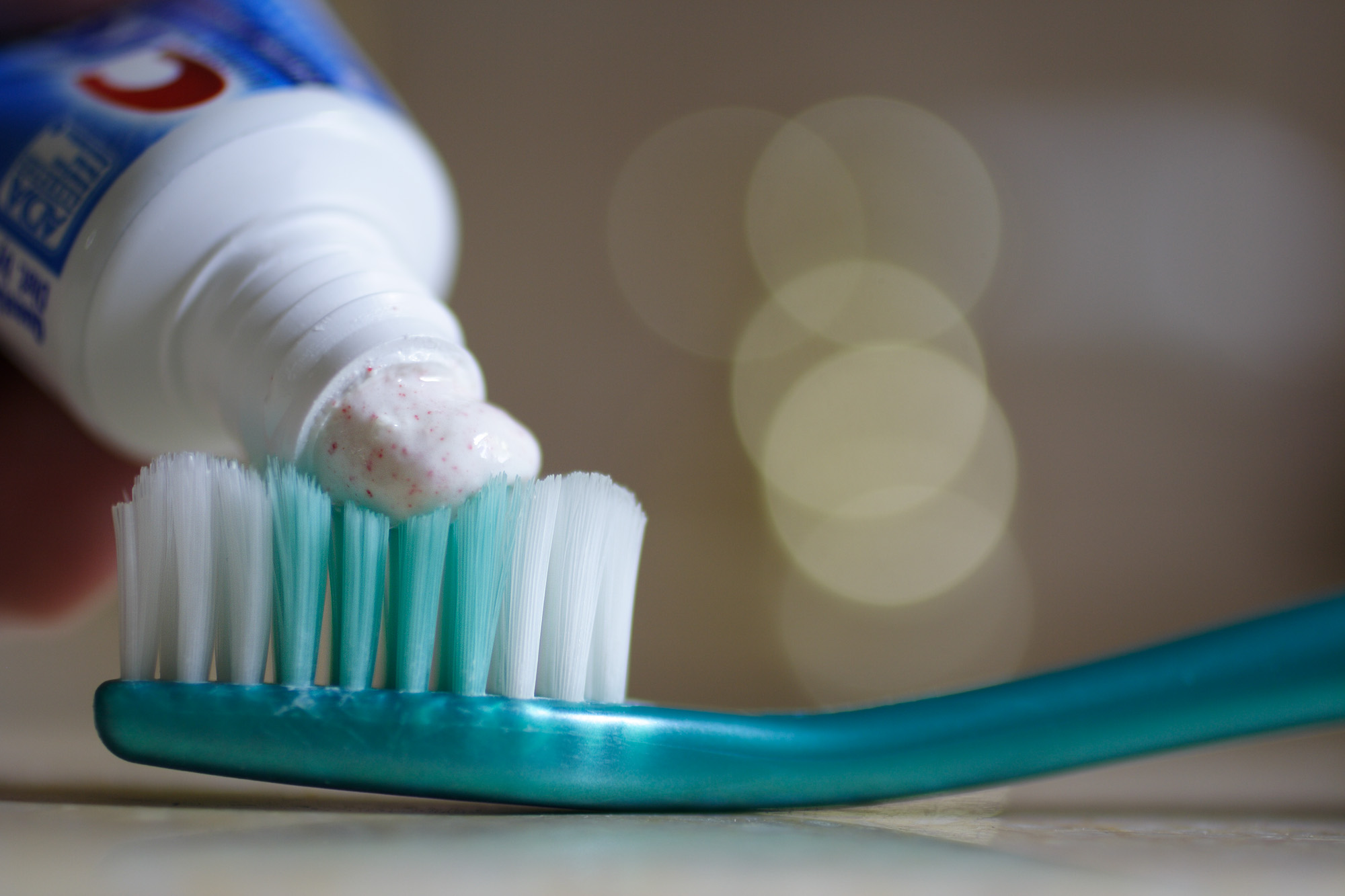
- Observed by: United States
- Significance: To reinforce the importance of children's oral health
- Observances: Parents are encouraged to make sure their kids brush their teeth for two minutes, twice a day
- Date: November 1
- Next time: 1 November 2025
- Frequency: annual

National Brush Day is observed in the United States on November 1, the day after Halloween, to reinforce the importance of children's oral health and promote good tooth-brushing habits recommended by dental experts. On this day, parents are encouraged to make sure their kids brush their teeth for two minutes, twice a day.

== History ==
Dental decay is the most common chronic childhood disease in America, with more than 16 million children in the U.S. suffering from untreated tooth decay. Nationwide, oral disease causes kids to miss 51 million school hours and their parents to lose 25 million work hours annually. According to a tracking survey conducted by the Ad Council, less than half of children currently brush their teeth as often or as long as dental health experts recommend. Oral disease disproportionately affects children from low-income families and these children have almost twice the number of decayed teeth as compared to others in the general population. National Brush Day began in 2013 as an extension of the Kids’ Healthy Mouths public service advertising (PSA) campaign by The Partnership for Healthy Mouths, Healthy Lives – a coalition of more than 35 leading oral health organizations—and the Ad Council. The campaign, which launched in August 2012, is designed to supply parents with simple ways to get their kids brushing their teeth for just two minutes, twice a day; to help reduce their risk of severe oral pain. National Brush Day occurs on the day after Halloween as a reminder to parents that good brushing habits can help improve children's dental health so they can develop into healthy adults.

== Public Service Advertisements ==
The Kids’ Healthy Mouths public service advertising (PSA) campaign launched in August 2012. Since the campaign's unveiling, more than 1.5 million people have visited 2min2x.org and the PSAs have received more than $33 million in donated media across TV, radio, print, web and outdoor outlets. Additionally, a 2013 Ad Council survey shows that in one year, English-speaking parents report that their children are 7 percent more likely to brush twice a day and 4 percent more likely to brush for two minutes each time. Spanish-speaking parents report significant improvement as well, with 8 percent more kids brushing for two minutes, twice a day.

== Current Activities ==
For the inaugural National Brush Day in 2013, the campaign launched new Kids’ Healthy Mouths social media accounts.

== Partners ==
- The Partnership for Healthy Mouths, Healthy Lives
- Ad Council
- Grey New York

== Response ==
Since the launch of the Kids’ Healthy Mouths campaign in 2012, the Partnership for Healthy Mouths, Healthy Lives and the Ad Council published research that indicated significantly more parents report that their kids are brushing their teeth for two minutes, twice a day.
