= Mary Florence Potts =

American inventor

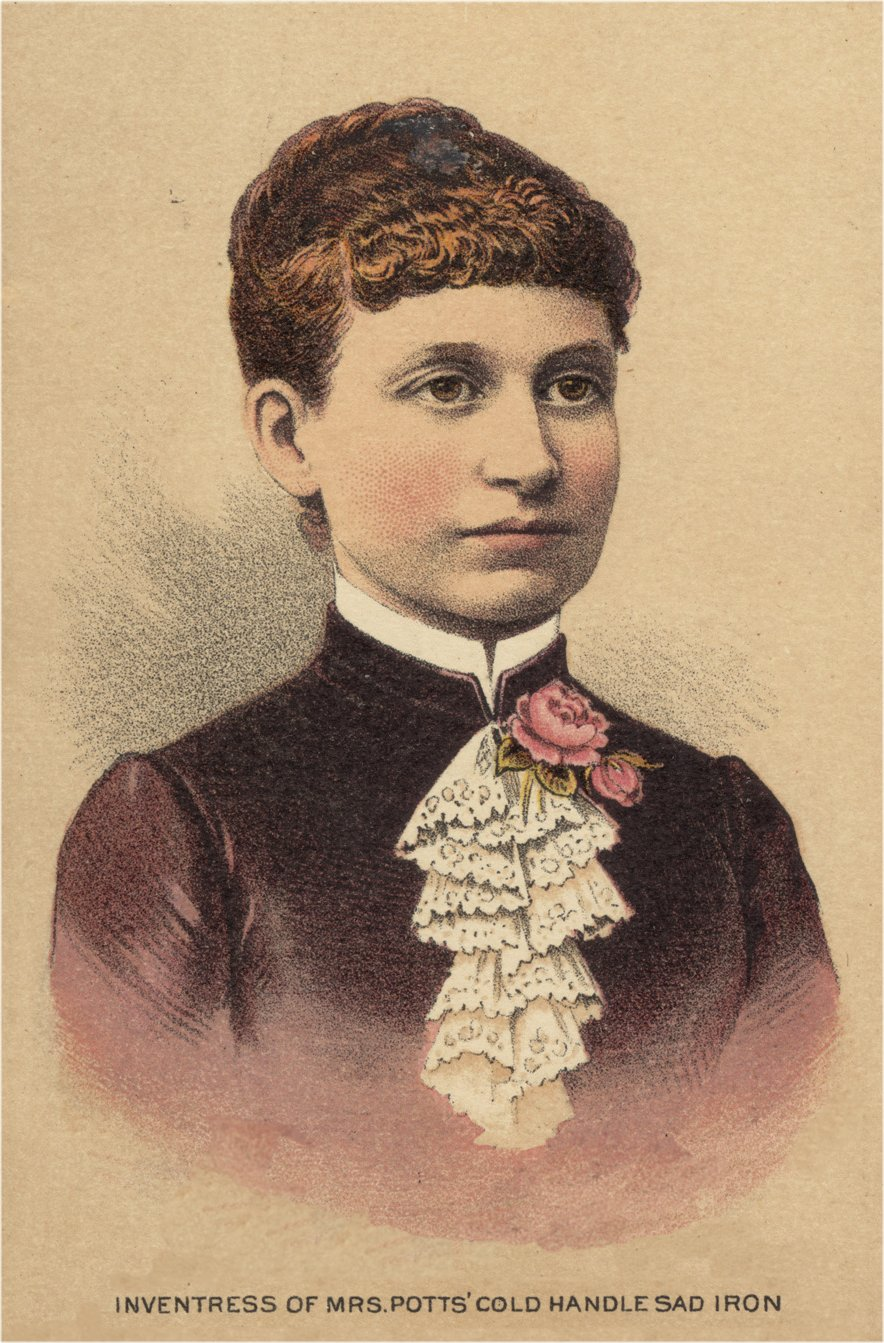
- Mary Florence Potts, ca. 1895
- Born: Mary Florence Webber; November 1, 1850; Ottumwa, Iowa, U.S.
- Died: June 24, 1922 (aged 71); Baltimore, Maryland, U.S.
- Resting place: New Camden Cemetery
- Occupation(s): Businesswoman and inventor
- Known for: Innovating mechanism of clothes iron
- Notable work: Potts's clothes iron
- Spouses: Joseph Hunt Potts
- Children: 2

Mary Florence Potts (née Webber; November 1, 1850 – June 24, 1922) was an American businesswoman and inventor. She invented clothes irons with detachable wooden handles, and they were exhibited at the 1876 Philadelphia Exposition World's Fair and the 1893 Chicago World's Fair. Her inventions were prominent throughout North America and the European continent in the 20th century and became the most popular heavy metal irons ever made.

Potts received her first patent of an improved clothes iron at the age of 19. Her next patented invention was an improvement on that model a year later which featured a detachable wooden handle. It was produced and sold by American Machine Company as a four-piece kit package of interchangeable parts. Her products were distributed through Montgomery Ward and Sears, Roebuck and Company, and were manufactured until 1951.

== Biography ==
Mary Florence Potts was born in Ottumwa, Iowa, on November 1, 1850, to Jacob Hanec Webber (from Pennsylvania) and Anna Nancy McGinley (from Pennsylvania). She married Joseph Hunt Potts, a man 17 years older than she, at the age of 17 on June 7, 1868, in Ottumwa, Iowa. Her first child was born in 1869, a son she named Oscero. Potts and her family moved from the Iowa town to Philadelphia in 1873. There are two known children born to Mary and Joseph Potts, a son, Oscero and a daughter, Leona born in 1874 in Philadelphia Pennsylvania. By 1890, they had moved to Camden, New Jersey, where her husband and Oscero worked as chemists. Her husband predeceased her in 1901, and she became the co-owner of Potts Manufacturing Company—which produced optical goods—with Oscero by 1910. She died in Baltimore on June 24, 1922, and was buried at the New Camden Cemetery, Camden, New Jersey.

== Inventions ==
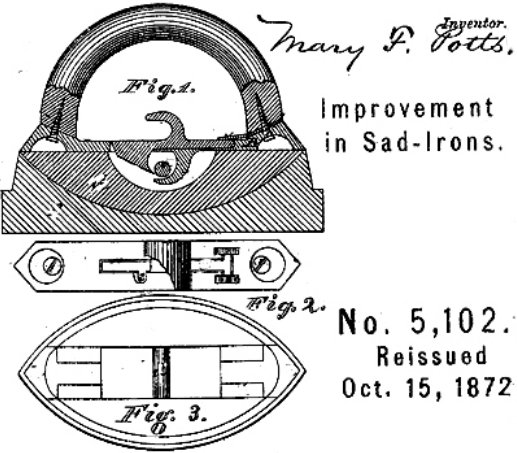
Potts 1872 patent of clothes iron mechanism

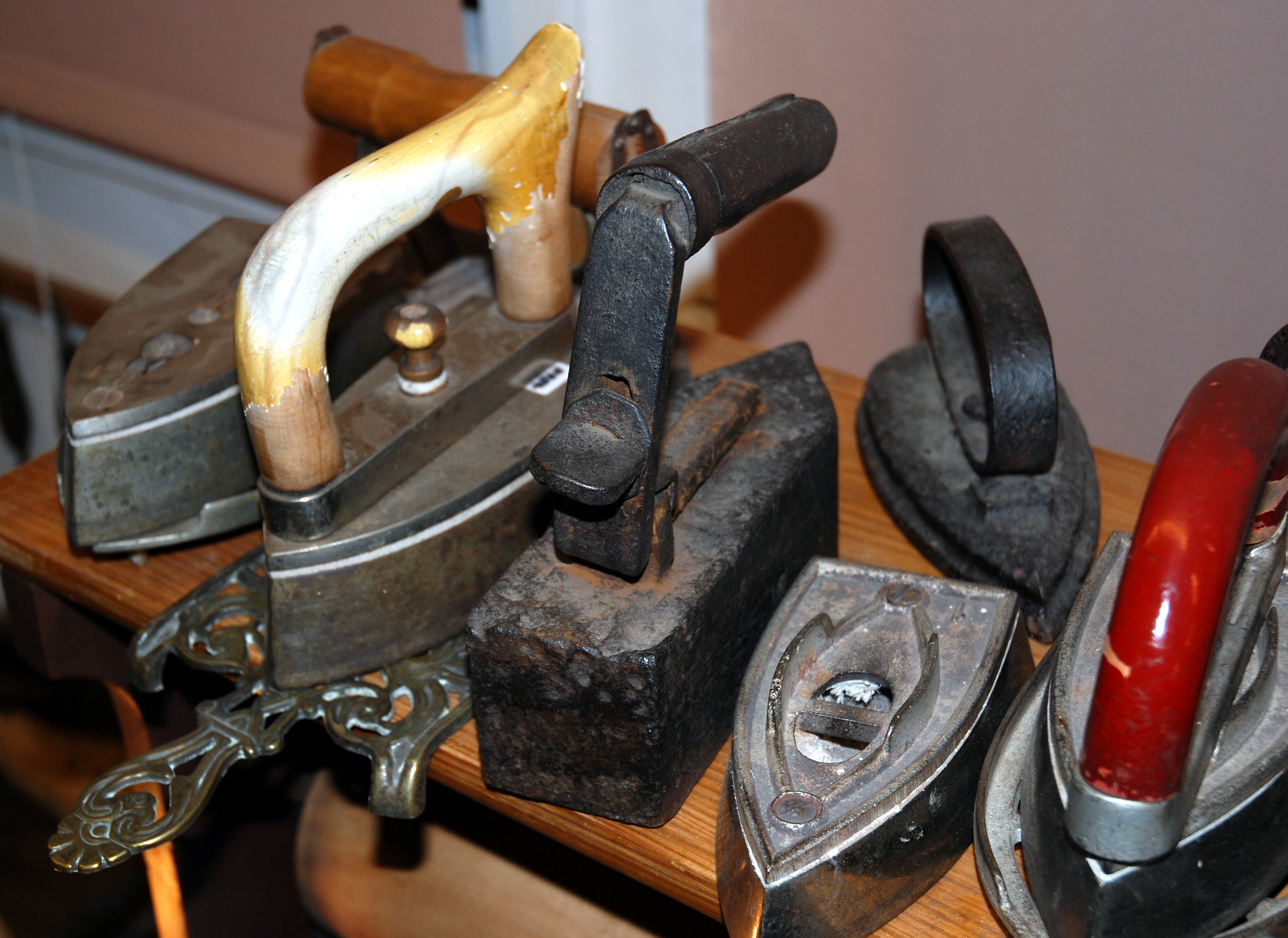
Conventional 19th century all-metal irons with Potts's detachable wood-handled ones. Trivet is under the iron with white handle.

Potts is associated with improvements to the sadiron that she started making from the age of 19. The old English word of sad before the "iron" meant heavy, dense, and solid. She had her first patent in 1870 for a wooden handle clothes iron of unique construction. Its design focused on convenience of use by replacing the metal handle which was prone to getting hot with a cool wooden one that was more comfortable to hold. The iron shape was double-pointed for operating in both directions and was made of hollow rather than solid metal. The flat bottom had a thick iron layer and the sides had thin sheets of iron. The hollow iron was to be filled with material that was a poor conductor of heat, such as cement or clay. Since her father was a plasterer by trade she experimented on filling some with a type of plaster of Paris. The advantage of these materials was that they did not radiate heat up to the user like its predecessor conventional solid metal iron did.

The conventional solid metal clothes iron of the 19th century weighed around 5 to 10 pounds (2.3 to 4.5 kg) and had to be heated on a stove. It was so hot, that often a thick cloth mitt or rag was used to touch the metal handle to prevent burned fingers. A disadvantage of the conventional all-metal iron was that ironing had to stop when it would cool down and it had to be reheated. Potts made improvements to her 1870 invention and devised a mechanism to work around this problem. It was United States patent #113,448. It consisted of a detachable wooden handle and three iron bases of different sizes that could be connected to the handle. The advantage of Potts's 1871 universal standard system was that a used up cooled base could be switched out with a waiting heated base and the ironing could resume immediately. The concept for the different sizes of the base was for the purpose of a specific ironing task.

The most pronounced feature of Potts's clothes iron was the detachable rounded wooden handle. That allowed the iron base to be placed on a heated stovetop and the handle removed at that time to stay away and cool while the base heated up. This prevented burned fingers, that often happened with the conventional all-solid-metal clothes iron of the 19th century. The design of the handle and bases were standard and could be easily reattached to various sizes after they were heated for a little delay in ironing.

Potts termed herself as an "inventress" — a Victorian expression. Initially, she sold her innovative clothes iron herself; it was later franchised out and manufactured by the American Machine Company of Philadelphia. The company marketed the clothes iron in a kit package that contained one wooden handle mechanism that attached to three iron bases. The handle could only connect to Potts's iron bases, in effect tripling sales of clothes irons over that of conventional solid metal irons. The kit also contained a trivet for placing a hot base on for times of rest. The Montgomery Ward catalog of 1894 offered a gift box of the Potts mechanism package for 90 cents. The Potts iron package was sold for 70 cents in 1896, and could be bought out of the Sears & Roebuck catalog for 78 cents in 1908. The mechanism was manufactured until 1951.

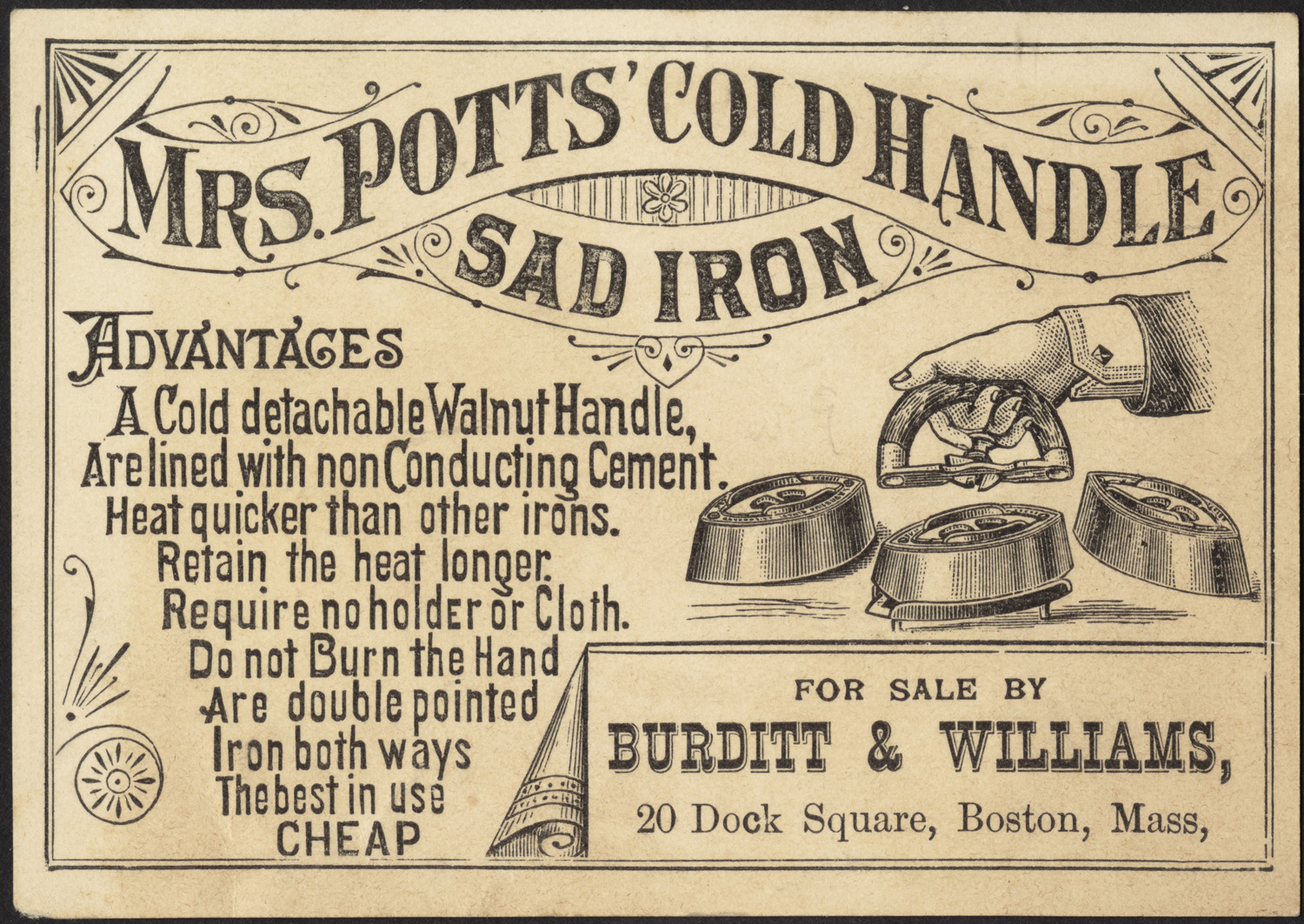
Mrs Potts cold wooden handle sad iron kits manufactured 1876–1950 by American Machine

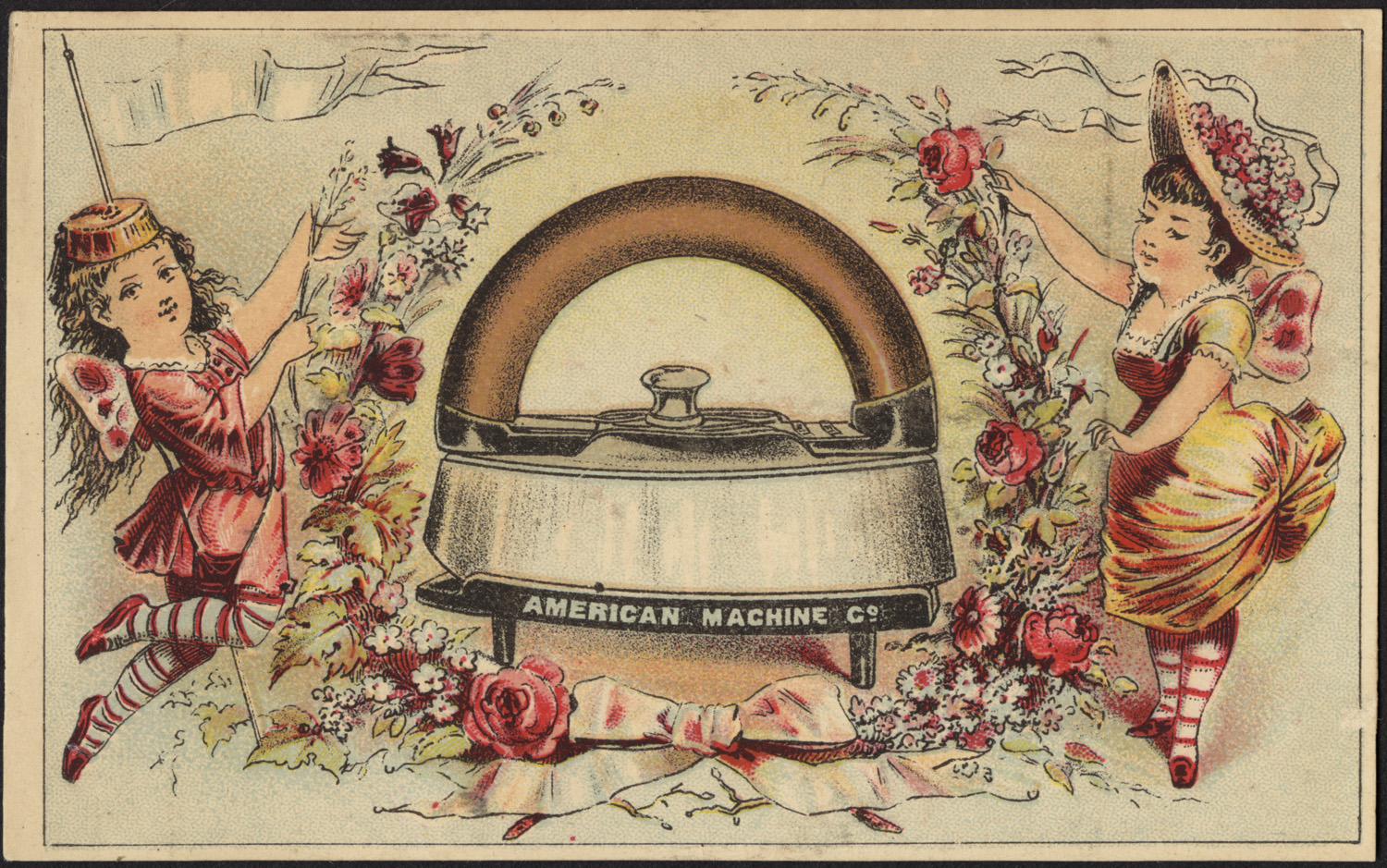
American Machine Company sad iron of Potts removable detachable base with wooden handle. Note trivet that is used under the clothes iron that came with kit package of three sizes of irons .

== Legacy ==
Potts' double-pointed clothes iron became a standard household appliance widely used in the 20th century throughout North America and the European continent. Her patents of various styles of clothes irons were the most popular heavy metal irons ever made. The 1876 Philadelphia Exposition World's Fair displayed Potts's cold-handled sadiron. She lectured all throughout the United States promoting her cold-handled clothing iron mechanism. Her style of clothing irons became so popular that by 1891 special manufacturing machines were made that could mass produce thousands of semicircular wood handles in one day. Her innovative clothes iron was also a favorite item at the 1893 Chicago World's Fair. The Pott's iron mechanism was used worldwide through the 20th century where electricity was not available.

Her innovation of a removable handle mechanism in 1871 was later implemented by Gillette in 1901. Gillette applied the concept in the form of a removable and disposable blade, with the option to reinsert a sharper blade; this was a spin-off of Potts's removable cooled clothes iron base that could be reattached to a preheated base ready to go for ironing. This concept preceded the 20th century construction industry concept of portable hand tools with removable exhausted battery packs that could be reattached to fully charged batteries.

== Bibliography ==
- Patent Office, United States (1880). Specifications and Drawings of Patents Issued from the U.S. Patent Office.
- Gale (2007). Dictionary of Women Worldwide. Thomson Gale. ISBN 978-0-7876-7585-1.
- Amran, Fred (May 24, 1984). "The innovative woman". New Scientist. Vol. 102, no. 1411. Reed Business Information. ISSN 0262-4079.
- Snodgrass, Mary Ellen (March 17, 2015). World Clothing and Fashion: An Encyclopedia of History, Culture, and Social Influence. Taylor & Francis. ISBN 978-1-317-45167-9.
- Patent Office, United States (1872). Specifications and Drawings of Patents Issued from the U.S. Patent Office.
- Williams, Robert L. Jr.; Williams, Helena A. (April 21, 2017). Vintage Marketing Differentiation: The Origins of Marketing and Branding Strategies. Palgrave Macmillan US. ISBN 978-1-137-38721-9.
- Zierdt-Warshaw, Linda (January 1, 2000). Women in Technology. ABC-CLIO. ISBN 978-1-57607-072-7.
