= List of counties and communities in the United States where English is not the majority language spoken at home =

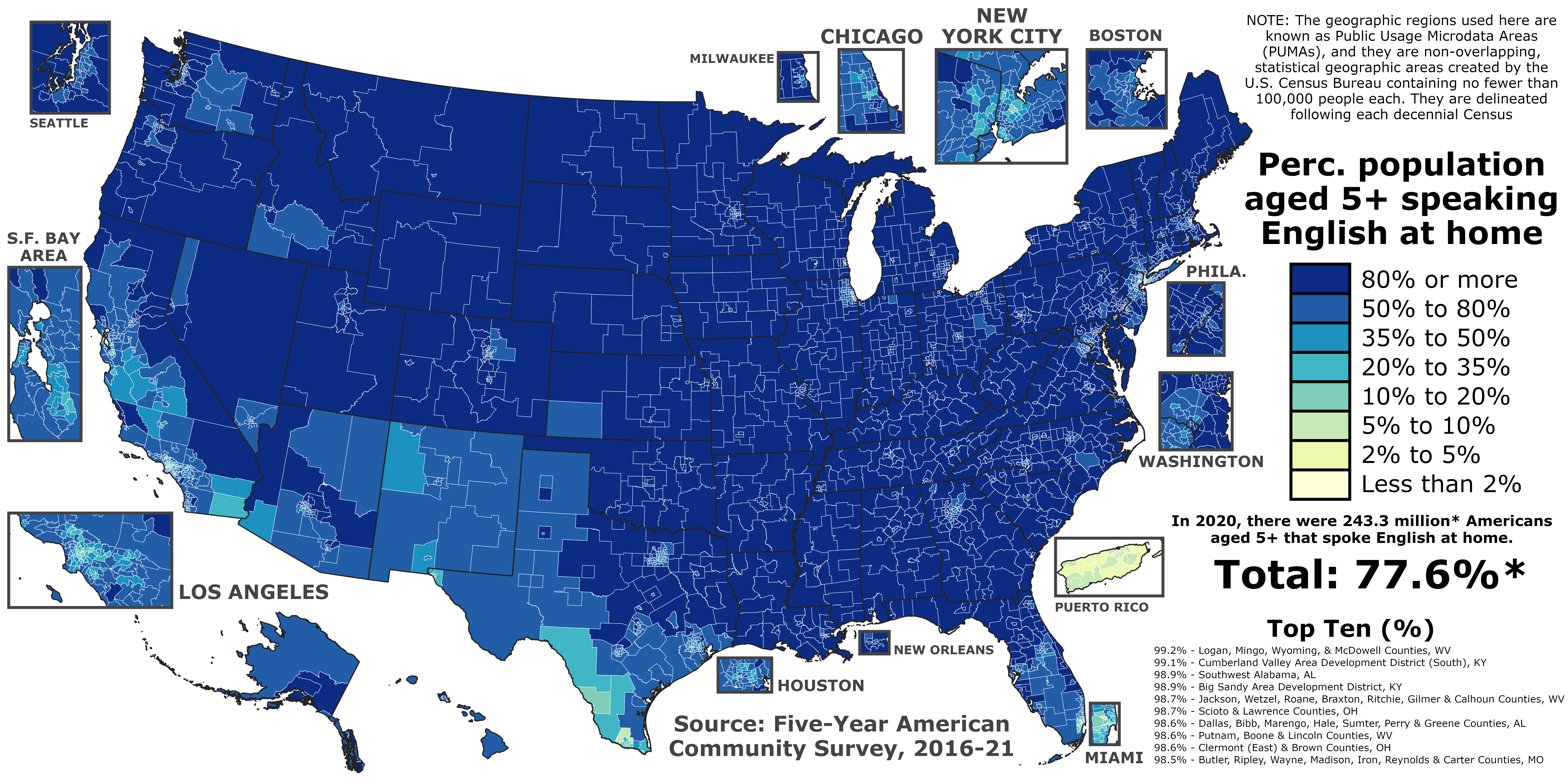
Percentage of Americans aged 5+ speaking English at home in each Public Usage Microdata Area (PUMA) of the fifty states, the District of Columbia, and Puerto Rico according to the 2016 - 2021 five-year American Community Survey

The following is a list of counties and communities in the United States where the English language is not the majority language spoken at home according to data from the United States 2022 5-year American Community Survey.

== Counties ==
A total of 38 United States counties have a majority of residents who speak a language other than English at home, according to data from the Modern Language Association's MLA's Data Map Center published in 2010. The following is a list of U.S. counties where English is a minority language.

=== Alaska ===
County	Population (2010)	Largest language spoken at home	Percentage of largest language spoken at home	Percentage of homes where English was spoken	Source
Aleutians East Borough	3,617	Tagalog	42.47%	19.33%	
Bethel Census Area	15,069	Yupik	63.14%	34.71%	
Kusilvak Census Area	6,540	Yupik	57.43%	41.87%	

=== Arizona ===
County	Population (2010)	Largest language spoken at home	Percentage of largest language spoken at home	Percentage of homes where English was spoken	Source
Apache	64,450	Navajo	55.85%	38.46%	
Santa Cruz	42,975	Spanish	80.24%	18.93%	

=== California ===
County	Population (2010)	Largest language spoken at home	Percentage of largest language spoken at home	Percentage of homes where English was spoken	Source
Imperial	154,538	Spanish	71.11%	26.95%	

=== Colorado ===
County	Population (2010)	Largest language spoken at home	Percentage of largest language spoken at home	Percentage of homes where English was spoken	Source
Costilla	3,424	Spanish	51.29%	47.25%	

=== Florida ===
County	Population (2010)	Largest language spoken at home	Percentage of largest language spoken at home	Percentage of homes where English was spoken	Source
Miami-Dade	2,293,780	Spanish	63.77%	28.07%	

=== Kansas ===
County	Population (2010)	Largest language spoken at home	Percentage of largest language spoken at home	Percentage of homes where English was spoken	Source
Seward	20,164	Spanish	48.51%	48.26%	

=== New Mexico ===
County	Population (2010)	Largest language spoken at home	Percentage of largest language spoken at home	Percentage of homes where English was spoken	Source
Doña Ana	186,160	Spanish	49.83%	48.19%	
Guadalupe	4,564	Spanish	53.33%	43.82%	
Mora	4,689	Spanish	61.06%	38.94%	
Rio Arriba	37,384	Spanish	55.28%	37.36%	
San Miguel	27,663	Spanish	57.35%	39.60%	

=== New York ===
County	Population (2010)	Largest language spoken at home	Percentage of largest language spoken at home	Percentage of homes where English was spoken	Source
Bronx	1,262,550	Spanish	46.29%	44.02%	

=== Texas ===
County	Population (2010)	Largest language spoken at home	Percentage of largest language spoken at home	Percentage of homes where English was spoken	Source
Brooks	6,870	Spanish	65.52%	33.83%	
Cameron	356,241	Spanish	72.87%	26.32%	
Culberson	2,290	Spanish	66.20%	33.49%	
Deaf Smith	17,220	Spanish	50.05%	48.59%	
Dimmit	9,073	Spanish	68.11%	30.06%	
Duval	11,143	Spanish	70.39%	29.27%	
El Paso	706,977	Spanish	72.85%	25.16%	
Frio	15,889	Spanish	63.57%	35.79%	
Hidalgo	661,934	Spanish	83.79%	15.17%	
Hudspeth	3,203	Spanish	76.49%	22.10%	
Jim Hogg	4,760	Spanish	83.70%	15.44%	
Jim Wells	37,304	Spanish	54.89%	44.42%	
La Salle	6,108	Spanish	60.04%	38.92%	
Maverick	47,790	Spanish	92.69%	6.16%	
Pecos	14,251	Spanish	53.98%	45.14%	
Presidio	7,078	Spanish	83.78%	15.40%	
Reeves	12,375	Spanish	75.44%	23.72%	
Starr	54,143	Spanish	95.74%	4.01%	
Uvalde	24,220	Spanish	54.08%	45.21%	
Val Verde	43,925	Spanish	71.79%	27.19%	
Webb	215,143	Spanish	91.70%	7.59%	
Zapata	12,173	Spanish	87.68%	12.31%	
Zavala	10,620	Spanish	72.64%	27.36%	

== Communities ==
The following is a list of individual communities where English is not the majority language spoken at home. The list below includes 1,603 communities in 44 states, with 1,101 of these having Spanish as the plurality language, 89 an Indo-European language other than English or Spanish, 35 an Asian or Pacific Islander language, 176 a language not yet listed, and 206 with an English plurality but not a majority.

=== Alabama ===
Community	Population	Type	Population of over five years	Plurality Language group	Percentage	English Percentage
Allgood	953	Town	862	Spanish	66.9	32.6

=== Alaska ===
Community	Population	Type	Population of over five years	Plurality Language group	Percentage	English Percentage
Akiachak	415	CDP	342	Other	78.7	20.5
Akiak	298	City	269	Other	54.6	45.4
Akutan	911	City	895	English	27.4	27.4
Ambler	277	City	251	Other	57.4	42.6
Atmautluak	34	CDP	31	Other	51.6	48.4
Chefornak	476	City	419	Other	96.9	3.1
Eek	475	City	451	Other	88.2	11.1
Fort Greely	158	CDP	158	Spanish	63.9	36.1
Fox River	712	CDP	598	Other Indo-European	52.7	45.2
Gambell	426	City	393	Other	73.3	25.7
Igiugig	69	CDP	67	Other	59.7	40.3
Kasigluk	389	CDP	340	Other	73.5	22.1
Kipnuk	572	CDP	505	Other	82.2	17.8
Kongiganak	353	CDP	311	Other	83	17
Kwethluk	561	City	490	Other	60.8	38
Kwigillingok	589	CDP	513	Other	97.1	2.9
Manokotak	629	City	571	Other	62.2	29.9
Mekoryuk	315	City	287	Other	67.2	31.4
Napakiak	692	City	625	Other	56.8	42.7
Napaskiak	582	City	522	Other	65.1	34.9
Newtok	96	CDP	89	Other	100	0
Nightmute	70	City	70	Other	95.7	4.3
Nikolski	12	CDP	12	Other	91.7	8.3
Nunam Iqua	59	City	50	Other	56	44
Nunapitchuk	827	City	701	Other	86	14
Oscarville	88	CDP	74	Other	75.7	24.3
Point Lay	172	CDP	158	Other	55.1	44.9
Portage Creek	3	CDP	3	Other	100	0
Port Protection	14	CDP	14	Other Indo-European	100	0
Primrose	84	CDP	76	Other Indo-European	51.3	48.7
Quinhagak	1,079	City	928	Other	74.2	25.5
Red Devil	6	CDP	6	Other	100	0
Savoonga	823	City	757	Other	64.9	35.1
Togiak	842	City	749	English	49.7	49.7
Toksook Bay	914	City	761	Other	95	5
Tuntutuliak	820	CDP	722	Other	73.7	26.3
Tununak	450	CDP	379	Other	78.1	20.1
Twin Hills	53	CDP	47	Other	63.8	36.2
Unalaska	4,342	City	4,149	Asian and Pacific Islander	45.3	35.7
Utqiaġvik	4,876	City	4,561	English	47.8	47.8

=== Arizona ===
Community	Population	Type	Population of over five years	Plurality Language group	Percentage	English Percentage
Aguila	362	CDP	362	Spanish	60.8	26.2
Ali Molina	88	CDP	88	Other	100	0
Anegam	115	CDP	115	Other	54.8	45.2
Arivaca Junction	606	CDP	580	Spanish	71.6	20
Avenue B and C	3,850	CDP	3,458	Spanish	61.3	37.9
Beyerville	61	CDP	61	Spanish	95.1	4.9
Bitter Springs	374	CDP	361	Other	62	36.6
Bowie	438	CDP	420	Spanish	57.1	41.7
Buckshot	7	CDP	7	Spanish	57.1	42.9
Burnside	505	CDP	469	Other	52	45.2
Cameron	780	CDP	747	Other	62.4	35.9
Canyon Day	1,621	CDP	1,372	Other	58.2	41.8
Cedar Creek	396	CDP	340	Other	62.1	37.9
Charco	21	CDP	21	Spanish	47.6	19
Chiawuli Tak	90	CDP	75	Other	100	0
Chilchinbito	849	CDP	805	Other	69.8	26.5
Chinle	3,888	CDP	3,634	Other	58.2	37.9
Chuichu	204	CDP	188	Other	46.8	35.1
Cibecue	1,419	CDP	1,274	Other	60.4	39.6
Cornfields	281	CDP	273	Other	65.2	34.8
Cottonwood	158	CDP	158	Other	76.6	23.4
Del Muerto	515	CDP	515	Other	87.2	9.7
Dennehotso	560	CDP	542	Other	94.1	5.9
Dilkon	1,326	CDP	1,231	Other	54.3	41
Donovan Estates	696	CDP	696	Spanish	82.8	17.2
Douglas	16,301	City	14,988	Spanish	69.9	28.6
Drexel Heights	30,254	CDP	28,283	Spanish	53.7	45.5
Drysdale	128	CDP	128	Spanish	67.2	32.8
Dudleyville	478	CDP	463	Spanish	50.3	49.7
East Fork	439	CDP	421	Other	61.5	38.5
Elfrida	288	CDP	267	Spanish	55.4	44.6
El Prado Estates	391	CDP	365	Spanish	86.6	13.4
First Mesa	1,454	CDP	1,322	Other	55.8	44.2
Gadsden	781	CDP	640	Spanish	90.3	9.7
Ganado	737	CDP	719	Other	55.9	41.6
Gila Bend	1,783	Town	1,710	Spanish	65.7	33.3
Greasewood	281	CDP	266	Other	79.7	19.5
Guadalupe	5,335	Town	5,080	Spanish	54	41.2
Gu Oidak	187	CDP	187	Other	65.8	34.2
Haivana Nakya	158	CDP	158	Other	63.9	36.1
Hard Rock	118	CDP	113	Other	80.5	19.5
Hayden	525	Town	512	Spanish	57	43
Hotevilla-Bacavi	678	CDP	658	Other	80.2	19.8
Houck	777	CDP	732	Other	65.4	33.3
Indian Wells	357	CDP	339	Other	72	24.5
Jeddito	211	CDP	202	Other	66.8	29.2
Kaibito	1,718	CDP	1,611	Other	56.4	43.6
Kaka	24	CDP	24	Other	100	0
Kayenta	5,366	CDP	4,962	Other	76.1	23
Keams Canyon	436	CDP	380	Other	55.3	44.7
Kino Springs	154	CDP	154	Spanish	62.3	37.7
Klagetoh	165	CDP	145	Other	64.1	35.9
Kykotsmovi Village	887	CDP	794	Other	82.6	17.4
Leupp	1,179	CDP	1,063	Other	51.8	46.3
Littlefield	82	CDP	82	Spanish	100	0
Low Mountain	644	CDP	598	Other	76.1	23.9
Lukachukai	1,706	CDP	1,620	Other	74.9	25.1
Lupton	5	CDP	5	Other	100	0
Maish Vaya	61	CDP	61	Other	82	18
Many Farms	693	CDP	631	Other	61.3	34.9
Moenkopi	1,064	CDP	1,009	Other	75.8	24.2
Naco	1,189	CDP	1,141	Spanish	82.8	17.2
Nazlini	468	CDP	433	Other	52.9	47.1
Nelson	387	CDP	323	Spanish	57.3	42.7
Nogales	19,761	City	18,656	Spanish	93	6.8
North Fork	1,689	CDP	1,626	Other	58.1	41.9
Nutrioso	410	CDP	213	Other Indo-European	78.9	21.1
Oak Springs	33	CDP	33	Other	100	0
Orange Grove Mobile Manor	165	CDP	165	Spanish	87.9	12.1
Pinon	1,018	CDP	942	Other	71.4	28.5
Pirtleville	1,483	CDP	1,456	Spanish	98.4	1.6
Rancho Mesa Verde	599	CDP	599	Spanish	86.5	13.5
Red Mesa	494	CDP	468	Other	50.9	39.7
Red Rock (Apache County)	75	CDP	75	Other	100	0
Rio Rico	21,447	CDP	19,667	Spanish	79.6	20
Rock Point	489	CDP	457	Other	86.9	7.9
Rough Rock	423	CDP	410	Other	88.5	11.5
Round Rock	590	CDP	536	Other	80.4	19.6
Sacate Village	171	CDP	171	Other	100	0
St. Michaels	774	CDP	750	Other	59.3	34.9
Sanders	696	CDP	618	Other	60	40
San Luis	35,189	City	32,508	Spanish	90.5	8.7
Santa Cruz	89	CDP	89	Other	100	0
Sawmill	794	CDP	759	Other	54.3	45.7
Seba Dalkai	132	CDP	113	Other	75.2	24.8
Second Mesa	1,372	CDP	1,234	Other	76.7	22.4
Sehili	156	CDP	148	Other	76.4	23.6
Seven Mile	1,032	CDP	938	Other	61.8	38.2
Shongopovi	1,151	CDP	1,072	Other	68	32
Shonto	387	CDP	338	Other	63.6	36.4
Somerton	14,278	City	13,180	Spanish	80.8	19.2
South Tucson	4,642	City	4,499	Spanish	51.8	44.6
Steamboat	417	CDP	402	Other	81.3	17.4
Summit	5,022	CDP	4,768	Spanish	74.6	25.4
Sweet Water Village	114	CDP	85	Other	65.9	34.1
Tacna	524	CDP	499	Spanish	54.7	45.3
Teec Nos Pos	884	CDP	779	Other	67.4	32.6
Tees Toh	452	CDP	422	Other	73.9	26.1
Theba	97	CDP	80	Spanish	88.8	11.3
Tolani Lake	494	CDP	455	Other	53.4	45.1
Tolleson	7,221	City	6,711	Spanish	59.1	39.8
Tonalea	167	CDP	151	Other	80.1	19.9
Tsaile	1,482	CDP	1,400	Other	56.1	36.7
Tuba City	8,372	CDP	7,871	Other	52.2	47.3
Tumacacori-Carmen	81	CDP	81	Spanish	72.8	27.2
Turkey Creek	457	CDP	398	Other	66.3	19.6
Wenden	469	CDP	462	Spanish	56.3	34.8
Whitecone	892	CDP	806	Other	70	30
Whiteriver	4,284	CDP	4,002	Other	56.2	42.5
Wide Ruins	7	CDP	7	Other	71.4	28.6
Window Rock	2,056	CDP	1,895	Other	65.6	32.5
Wittmann	343	CDP	287	Spanish	80.8	19.2

=== Arkansas ===
Community	Population	Type	Population of over five years	Plurality Language group	Percentage	English Percentage
Cincinnati	619	CDP	557	English	47	47
Danville	2,384	City	2,139	Spanish	50.4	48.9
De Queen	6,132	City	5,666	Spanish	53.3	43.6
Havana	566	City	549	English	49.9	49.9
Sherrill	194	Town	148	Spanish	81.8	18.2
Wickes	869	Town	770	Spanish	57.4	42.6

=== California ===
Community	Population	Type	Population of over five years	Plurality Language group	Percentage	English Percentage
Alhambra	82,295	City	78,256	Asian and Pacific Islander	43.1	30.7
Allensworth	459	CDP	431	Spanish	84.5	15.1
Alondra Park	8,314	CDP	7,724	Spanish	46.3	37
Alpaugh	880	CDP	705	Spanish	83.3	15.3
Alum Rock	11,831	CDP	11,096	Spanish	53.4	30.1
Amesti	3,048	CDP	2,964	Spanish	50	49.4
Anaheim	347,111	City	325,919	Spanish	41.9	40.4
Arbuckle	3,072	CDP	2,815	Spanish	71.7	28.3
Arcadia	56,181	City	53,860	Asian and Pacific Islander	45.5	42.5
Armona	4,367	CDP	4,013	Spanish	53.2	38
Artesia	16,237	City	15,416	English	33.4	33.4
Arvin	19,613	City	17,660	Spanish	83.3	15.7
Ashland	23,164	CDP	21,422	English	40.3	40.3
August	9,089	CDP	8,157	Spanish	66.2	31.2
Avenal	13,423	City	12,433	Spanish	75.6	23
Avocado Heights	13,470	CDP	12,702	Spanish	61.7	27.6
Azusa	49,704	City	46,916	English	44.7	44.7
Baker	553	CDP	490	Spanish	81	16.5
Baldwin Park	71,692	City	67,896	Spanish	60.8	19.6
Ballico	535	CDP	500	Spanish	48	36.6
Bay Point	24,407	CDP	22,703	Spanish	57	34.5
Bayview (Contra Costa County)	2,529	CDP	2,503	English	44.4	44.4
Bell	33,377	City	31,105	Spanish	82.2	12.6
Bellflower	78,352	City	73,712	Spanish	45.8	42.7
Bell Gardens	39,263	City	36,744	Spanish	90.1	9.2
Benton Park	5,836	CDP	5,319	Spanish	49.7	49.4
Biola	1,335	CDP	1,181	Spanish	69.9	20.2
Bloomington	23,051	CDP	21,965	Spanish	67.5	31.5
Boronda	1,885	CDP	1,785	Spanish	78.8	15.5
Brawley	26,509	City	24,058	Spanish	64.8	34.4
Bret Harte	4,926	CDP	4,288	Spanish	84.9	15.1
Broadmoor	4,419	CDP	4,175	English	46.8	46.8
Bucks Lake	19	CDP	19	Spanish	100	0
Buena Park	83,542	City	78,727	English	48.5	48.5
Buttonwillow	1,148	CDP	1,083	Spanish	70.7	29.3
Bystrom	3,941	CDP	3,537	Spanish	62.2	35.5
Calexico	38,599	City	35,785	Spanish	93.4	5.8
Calipatria	6,579	City	6,352	Spanish	66.4	32.7
Calwa	2,486	CDP	2,172	Spanish	72.8	25.8
Cantua Creek	522	CDP	484	Spanish	90.1	9.9
Carson	94,475	City	90,227	English	45.6	45.6
Caruthers	1,950	CDP	1,870	Spanish	65.9	31.2
Casa Loma	1,431	CDP	1,391	Spanish	58	40.5
Casmalia	64	CDP	64	Spanish	56.3	43.8
Castroville	6,620	CDP	6,156	Spanish	75.4	22.6
Cathedral City	51,964	City	49,387	English	47.7	47.7
Ceres	49,183	City	45,922	Spanish	49.3	40.9
Cerritos	49,016	City	46,936	English	44.8	44.8
Cherokee Strip	173	CDP	164	Spanish	86.6	13.4
Cherryland	15,499	CDP	14,803	English	44.3	44.3
Chualar	959	CDP	901	Spanish	88.5	11.5
Chula Vista	276,103	City	260,457	Spanish	45.6	43.9
Citrus	10,979	CDP	10,499	Spanish	53.5	39.9
Coachella	42,279	City	40,258	Spanish	81.1	18.6
College City	343	CDP	324	Spanish	52.8	47.2
Colma	1,376	Town	1,317	English	38.3	38.3
Colton	53,959	City	50,800	English	47.9	47.9
Commerce	12,253	City	11,775	Spanish	73.5	25.2
Compton	94,822	City	87,812	Spanish	63.9	35
Corcoran	22,808	City	21,530	English	49.1	49.1
Cottonwood (Kern County)	2,802	CDP	2,282	Spanish	62.6	35.5
Crows Landing	212	CDP	212	Spanish	68.9	31.1
Cudahy	22,657	City	21,187	Spanish	89.2	10.2
Cupertino	59,763	City	57,043	Asian and Pacific Islander	41.9	38.6
Cutler	4,429	CDP	4,094	Spanish	87	12
Daly City	103,648	City	99,445	Asian and Pacific Islander	42.2	38.2
Delano	50,498	City	47,457	Spanish	61.4	27.3
Delft Colony	1,038	CDP	761	Spanish	80	20
Delhi	10,896	CDP	10,132	Spanish	70.1	21.1
Del Rey	1,491	CDP	1,425	Spanish	79.6	20.4
Desert Shores	360	CDP	360	Spanish	53.3	46.7
Desert View Highlands	3,275	CDP	3,185	Spanish	53.4	45.4
Diamond Bar	54,534	City	52,022	Asian and Pacific Islander	45	40.2
Di Giorgio	315	CDP	296	Spanish	82.8	17.2
Dinuba	24,713	City	22,784	Spanish	64.6	34.8
Dos Palos	5,755	City	5,351	Spanish	50	44.8
Dos Palos Y	185	CDP	178	Spanish	66.3	33.7
Downey	113,052	City	107,468	Spanish	56.8	35
Duarte	21,686	City	20,560	English	42.7	42.7
Ducor	701	CDP	553	Spanish	86.1	10.7
Earlimart	7,674	CDP	7,013	Spanish	86.3	9.4
East Bakersfield	10,754	CDP	9,649	Spanish	63.2	35.7
East Los Angeles	117,222	CDP	110,946	Spanish	83.1	15.5
East Niles	29,981	CDP	27,964	Spanish	67.4	32
East Orosi	422	CDP	370	Spanish	79.7	18.4
East Palo Alto	29,520	City	27,810	Spanish	52	34.3
East Pasadena	5,474	CDP	5,174	English	39.7	39.7
East Porterville	5,424	CDP	5,044	Spanish	72.9	24.3
East Rancho Dominguez	14,924	CDP	14,223	Spanish	73.8	25.2
East San Gabriel	22,654	CDP	21,349	Asian and Pacific Islander	46.1	33.7
Edison	490	CDP	490	Spanish	86.3	13.7
Edmundson Acres	335	CDP	326	Spanish	82.5	17.5
El Adobe	240	CDP	240	Spanish	83.8	16.3
El Centro	44,184	City	41,272	Spanish	74.9	23.8
El Monte	108,682	City	102,207	Spanish	55.2	17
El Nido	459	CDP	398	Spanish	83.9	16.1
El Rancho	62	CDP	50	Spanish	100	0
El Rio	6,418	CDP	6,161	Spanish	50	44.9
Fairfax	1,776	CDP	1,776	Spanish	66.3	33.7
Fairmead	1,263	CDP	1,163	Spanish	65.6	32.7
Farmersville	10,393	City	9,853	Spanish	69.1	30.7
Fetters Hot Springs-Agua Caliente	4,224	CDP	3,871	Spanish	54.4	43.1
Fillmore	16,455	City	15,814	Spanish	49.8	48.7
Firebaugh	8,139	City	7,506	Spanish	80	20
Florence-Graham	63,132	CDP	58,624	Spanish	85.1	14.5
Florin	49,992	CDP	47,187	English	44.5	44.5
Fontana	209,279	City	196,199	Spanish	50.4	42.2
Foster City	33,215	City	31,148	English	46	46
Franklin (Merced County)	7,581	CDP	7,091	English	42.1	42.1
Freedom	3,360	CDP	3,164	Spanish	52.9	43.5
Fremont	228,795	City	215,423	English	37.3	37.3
French Camp	3,860	CDP	3,681	Spanish	51.2	45.2
Fuller Acres	717	CDP	650	Spanish	82.5	17.5
Gardena	60,377	City	57,657	English	45.2	45.2
Garden Acres	10,124	CDP	9,171	Spanish	73	25.2
Garden Grove	171,637	City	162,967	Asian and Pacific Islander	36.7	32.3
Garnet	7,328	CDP	6,899	Spanish	73.2	25.9
Gerber	1,084	CDP	1,084	Spanish	77.8	22.2
Glendale	194,512	City	185,009	Other Indo-European	41.2	33.3
Gonzales	8,581	City	7,852	Spanish	71.9	27.1
Good Hope	8,291	CDP	7,762	Spanish	68.4	31.6
Goshen	4,974	CDP	4,629	Spanish	54.7	44I
Grayson	1,593	CDP	1,543	Spanish	76.1	22.7
Green Acres	3,023	CDP	2,633	Spanish	64.9	33.8
Greenfield	4,417	CDP	3,704	Spanish	60.1	39.8
Greenfield	18,998	City	16,899	Spanish	81.4	16.3
Guadalupe	8,272	City	7,423	Spanish	69.9	26.8
Gustine	6,122	City	5,910	English	49.6	49.6
Hacienda Heights	55,461	CDP	52,703	English	35.9	35.9
Hamilton City	2,191	CDP	2,140	Spanish	82.2	17.8
Hawaiian Gardens	14,011	City	13,125	Spanish	60	26.9
Hawthorne	86,978	City	81,120	Spanish	47	42.6
Hayward	160,602	City	151,732	English	39.7	39.7
Heber	7,910	CDP	7,152	Spanish	88.6	11.4
Hillcrest	10,495	CDP	9,686	Spanish	63.9	34.6
Holtville	5,620	City	5,273	Spanish	74.6	23.8
Home Garden	1,511	CDP	1,341	Spanish	60.9	37.3
Home Gardens	12,278	CDP	11,453	Spanish	56.1	35
Honcut	313	CDP	313	Spanish	65.5	34.5
Huntington Park	54,547	City	51,270	Spanish	89.6	9.8
Huron	6,260	City	5,751	Spanish	87.7	10.5
Hypericum	207	CDP	195	Spanish	96.4	3.6
Imperial	20,430	City	18,389	Spanish	63.7	32.5
Indio	89,616	City	85,077	Spanish	50.7	46.3
Indio Hills	605	CDP	508	Spanish	57.7	24
Inglewood	106,806	City	100,931	English	49.9	49.9
Interlaken	8,039	CDP	7,363	Spanish	60.4	39.2
Irvine	304,527	City	284,209	English	49.6	49.6
Irwindale	1,343	City	1,268	Spanish	55.7	43.9
Ivanhoe	4,329	CDP	4,074	Spanish	76.8	23.2
Johannesburg	94	CDP	94	Asian and Pacific Islander	70.2	29.8
Jovista	43	CDP	43	Spanish	100	0
Jurupa Valley	105,672	City	98,909	Spanish	53.4	42.7
Kelseyville	3,828	CDP	3,292	Spanish	57.8	42.2
Kennedy	2,516	CDP	2,263	Spanish	77	21.6
Kerman	15,980	City	14,736	Spanish	64.7	27.3
Kettleman City	956	CDP	861	Spanish	100	0
Keyes	5,827	CDP	5,459	Spanish	66.2	31.6
King City	13,471	City	11,954	Spanish	76.4	20.6
Knights Ferry	72	CDP	72	Asian and Pacific Islander	55.6	36.1
Lake Hughes	867	CDP	788	English	49	49
Lakeside	1,405	CDP	1,357	Spanish	52.4	46.7
Lakeview	2,327	CDP	2,212	Spanish	64.7	35.3
Lamont	13,715	CDP	12,563	Spanish	83.8	15.9
Lanare	528	CDP	528	Spanish	86.6	13.4
La Puente	37,835	City	36,097	Spanish	64.7	23.7
Las Lomas	3,059	CDP	2,776	Spanish	80.6	16.8
La Vina	912	CDP	803	Spanish	90	10
Lawndale	31,553	City	29,668	Spanish	56.2	30.6
Le Grand	1,679	CDP	1,553	Spanish	52.7	46.4
Lemon Hill	14,824	CDP	13,846	English	45.9	45.9
Lennox	20,687	CDP	19,496	Spanish	81.3	13.9
Lindsay	12,581	City	11,771	Spanish	72.6	26.6
Linnell Camp	737	CDP	568	Spanish	95.1	4.9
Littlerock	1,509	CDP	1,380	Spanish	65	34.3
Livingston	14,344	City	13,177	Spanish	61.2	18.2
London	1,785	CDP	1,652	Spanish	81.9	18.1
Los Angeles	3,881,041	City	3,674,596	English	42.6	42.6
Los Banos	45,560	City	41,352	Spanish	49.3	47.1
Lost Hills	1,754	CDP	1,627	Spanish	91.5	8.5
Lower Lake	1,326	CDP	1,240	Spanish	50.2	49.8
Lynwood	66,346	City	61,668	Spanish	78.9	19.9
Macdoel	143	CDP	115	Spanish	79.1	20.9
McFarland	13,971	City	12,945	Spanish	72.6	27.1
Madera	66,784	City	61,614	Spanish	59.5	38.3
Madera Acres	9,794	CDP	9,164	Spanish	57.5	41.8
Madison	455	CDP	455	Spanish	57.6	42.2
Manchester	298	CDP	275	Spanish	52.4	47.6
Matheny	766	CDP	702	Spanish	67.1	32.9
Maxwell	1,181	CDP	1,105	Spanish	62.1	37.9
Mayflower Village	5,209	CDP	5,013	English	47.4	47.4
Maywood	25,009	City	23,317	Spanish	91.1	8.4
Meadowbrook	3,409	CDP	3,168	Spanish	53.8	42.8
Mead Valley	20,581	CDP	19,217	Spanish	75.7	23.2
Mecca	6,313	CDP	6,156	Spanish	85.8	14.2
Mendota	12,603	City	11,367	Spanish	85.4	12.7
Mesa Verde	926	CDP	756	Spanish	56.9	43.1
Mettler	122	CDP	111	Spanish	88.3	11.7
Mexican Colony	302	CDP	286	Spanish	55.6	44.4
Midway City	8,032	CDP	7,714	Asian and Pacific Islander	41.2	29.3
Milpitas	79,092	City	74,643	Asian and Pacific Islander	45	32
Monmouth	202	CDP	169	Spanish	68.6	27.2
Montalvin Manor	2,195	CDP	2,150	Spanish	71	23
Montclair	37,842	City	35,457	Spanish	48.8	39.8
Montebello	62,056	City	58,543	Spanish	57.6	29
Monterey Park	60,386	City	58,140	Asian and Pacific Islander	53.2	27.2
Monterey Park Tract	138	CDP	130	Spanish	94.6	5.4
Mountain House	23,590	CDP	22,185	English	49.7	49.7
Mount Hebron	113	CDP	108	Spanish	100	0
Muscoy	11,802	CDP	10,913	Spanish	83	15.5
National City	56,345	City	53,265	Spanish	55.3	29.2
Newark	47,470	City	44,391	English	42.6	42.6
Newman	12,275	City	11,359	Spanish	53.7	41.1
Norris Canyon	954	CDP	935	Asian and Pacific Islander	48.7	30.8
North El Monte	3,983	CDP	3,775	English	43.4	43.4
North Fair Oaks	13,718	CDP	12,582	Spanish	60.2	31.3
North Richmond	3,734	CDP	3,560	Spanish	54.5	31.2
North Shore	2,610	CDP	2,599	Spanish	85.5	14.5
Norwalk	101,893	City	94,627	Spanish	52.1	35.7
Nuevo	7,305	CDP	6,791	Spanish	54.4	45.3
Oasis	3,775	CDP	3,567	Spanish	85.2	14.5
Ocotillo	146	CDP	146	Spanish	50	39
Old River	106	CDP	87	Spanish	100	0
Ontario	176,326	City	164,676	Spanish	48	45.2
Orange Cove	9,635	City	8,823	Spanish	84.1	15.9
Orosi	9,100	CDP	8,192	Spanish	76.7	18.5
Oxnard	202,279	City	189,513	Spanish	59.1	33.6
Pajaro	2,723	CDP	2,337	Spanish	84.1	15.9
Palmdale	166,895	City	155,015	English	47.7	47.7
Paramount	53,255	City	50,086	Spanish	68.7	27.1
Parklawn	1,543	CDP	1,474	Spanish	82.6	15.2
Parksdale	2,500	CDP	2,177	Spanish	62.2	36.7
Parkway	16,242	CDP	15,150	English	47.1	47.1
Parkwood	2,073	CDP	1,807	Spanish	62	36.3
Parlier	14,625	City	13,530	Spanish	80.9	19.1
Patterson	23,678	City	21,506	Spanish	53	38.3
Perris	78,881	City	73,051	Spanish	62.6	34.2
Pescadero	349	CDP	326	English	45.7	45.7
Pico Rivera	61,561	City	58,876	Spanish	62	34.6
Piru	2,182	CDP	1,927	Spanish	71.7	27.9
Pixley	3,811	CDP	3,599	Spanish	76.3	23
Plainview	378	CDP	370	Spanish	83.2	16.8
Planada	3,494	CDP	3,271	Spanish	82.2	17.8
Pomona	149,831	City	140,296	Spanish	54.3	35.2
Poplar-Cotton Center	1,918	CDP	1,780	Spanish	63.8	17.4
Porterville	62,491	City	58,236	Spanish	49	47.4
Potomac Park	10,697	CDP	9,803	Spanish	76.3	22
Potrero	509	CDP	457	Spanish	100	0
Pumpkin Center	258	CDP	258	Spanish	93	0
Raisin City	267	CDP	248	Spanish	85.9	12.9
Reedley	25,248	City	22,872	Spanish	61.5	37.5
Rexland Acres	3,788	CDP	3,341	Spanish	75.6	24.4
Rialto	103,873	City	97,395	Spanish	55.3	41.8
Richgrove	1,837	CDP	1,751	Spanish	82.4	13.6
Richmond	115,619	City	109,410	English	45.5	45.5
Ripley	614	CDP	549	Spanish	75.2	24.8
Riverdale	2,756	CDP	2,496	Spanish	71.1	27
Riverdale Park	795	CDP	729	Spanish	88.3	11.7
Robbins	341	CDP	331	Spanish	55.6	44.4
Rollingwood	3,483	CDP	3,436	Spanish	61.6	17.3
Romoland	2,738	CDP	2,543	Spanish	67	32.2
Rosemead	51,043	City	48,626	Asian and Pacific Islander	56	19.2
Rouse	1,003	CDP	876	Spanish	68.8	18
Rowland Heights	47,209	CDP	44,799	Asian and Pacific Islander	52.9	24.6
Salinas	162,783	City	149,517	Spanish	68.1	27.7
Salton City	6,202	CDP	5,831	Spanish	73.2	26.6
San Ardo	624	CDP	531	Spanish	54.8	45.2
San Bernardino	221,041	City	205,882	Spanish	47.9	47.3
San Fernando	23,958	City	22,616	Spanish	71.2	26.1
San Gabriel	39,211	City	37,418	Asian and Pacific Islander	53.2	28.5
Sanger	26,553	City	24,431	Spanish	48.7	48
San Joaquin	3,725	City	3,292	Spanish	81.5	17.9
San Jose	1,001,176	City	947,582	English	41.9	41.9
San Leandro	89,723	City	86,148	English	47.5	47.5
San Lorenzo	29,759	CDP	28,087	English	45.4	45.4
San Lucas	377	CDP	341	Spanish	90.3	9.7
San Marino	12,442	City	11,855	Asian and Pacific Islander	52.5	40.5
San Miguel (San Luis Obispo County)	2,756	CDP	2,652	Spanish	56.5	35.2
San Pablo	31,907	City	30,264	Spanish	48.5	34.7
Santa Ana	311,379	City	292,992	Spanish	67.6	21.7
Santa Clara	128,058	City	120,376	English	44.9	44.9
Santa Fe Springs	18,840	City	17,503	English	45.8	45.8
Santa Maria	109,543	City	99,477	Spanish	60.3	34
Santa Nella	2,055	CDP	1,871	Spanish	56	38.3
Santa Paula	30,788	City	28,594	Spanish	63.8	34.7
Saticoy	1,628	CDP	1,461	Spanish	62.7	35.3
Seeley	1,756	CDP	1,509	Spanish	82	18
Selma	24,576	City	22,917	English	48.7	48.7
Seville	411	CDP	388	Spanish	79.9	20.1
Shafter	20,162	City	18,723	Spanish	60.1	37.4
Shandon	1,031	CDP	992	Spanish	49.9	49.2
Sierraville	227	CDP	227	Spanish	66.1	33.9
Smith Corner	316	CDP	297	Spanish	72.4	27.6
Soledad	24,781	City	23,762	Spanish	64.9	32.2
South El Monte	19,694	City	18,519	Spanish	64.3	19.3
South Gate	92,381	City	86,911	Spanish	84.6	14.4
South Monrovia Island	6,833	CDP	6,462	Spanish	52.4	39
South San Francisco	65,596	City	62,647	English	48.1	48.1
South San Gabriel	7,786	CDP	7,368	Asian and Pacific Islander	56	25.3
South San Jose Hills	18,717	CDP	17,743	Spanish	72.1	19.6
South Taft	2,370	CDP	2,111	Spanish	60.4	39.3
South Whittier	57,383	CDP	53,822	Spanish	54	40.1
Stanton	38,271	City	36,231	Spanish	42	32.3
Stratford	1,034	CDP	958	Spanish	56.1	30.1
Strawberry (Tuolumne County)	64	CDP	64	Other Indo-European	71.9	28.1
Sultana	1,005	CDP	941	Spanish	73	23.9
Sunnyvale	154,573	City	144,249	English	40.6	40.6
Sun Village	11,472	CDP	10,706	Spanish	55.4	42.2
Taft Mosswood	987	CDP	966	Spanish	47.5	34.9
Tara Hills	5,202	CDP	4,776	English	46.6	46.6
Temple City	36,165	City	34,188	Asian and Pacific Islander	52.6	33.1
Terra Bella	1,806	CDP	1,662	Spanish	69.3	30.7
Teviston	1,038	CDP	975	Spanish	67.1	32.9
Thermal	1,352	CDP	1,246	Spanish	80.8	17.5
Thornton	873	CDP	825	Spanish	53.1	46.1
Three Rocks	181	CDP	181	Spanish	81.2	18.8
Tipton	3,170	CDP	3,017	Spanish	85.7	11.7
Tonyville	314	CDP	250	Spanish	98	2
Tooleville	51	CDP	51	Spanish	100	0
Topaz	162	CDP	162	Spanish	66	25.3
Tranquillity	786	CDP	729	Spanish	60.8	39.2
Traver	427	CDP	393	Spanish	75.3	22.1
Tustin	79,514	City	74,258	English	48.8	48.8
Union City	69,502	City	66,289	English	35.4	35.4
University of California-Davis	8,229	CDP	8,110	English	49	49
University of California-Merced	1,079	CDP	1,079	Spanish	49.1	23
Valinda	21,952	CDP	21,097	Spanish	58.1	26.6
Val Verde	3,292	CDP	3,172	Spanish	51.9	44.3
Vernon	329	City	312	Spanish	81.7	16.3
Victor	608	CDP	579	Spanish	58.9	41.1
Vincent	15,266	CDP	14,385	Spanish	46.8	38
Vista Santa Rosa	2,269	CDP	2,244	Spanish	55.7	44.2
Walnut	28,212	City	27,164	Asian and Pacific Islander	52.4	35.2
Walnut Park	16,209	CDP	15,348	Spanish	87.9	11.4
Wasco	26,317	City	24,395	Spanish	69.4	29.4
Watsonville	52,457	City	48,572	Spanish	70.8	25.1
Waukena	63	CDP	63	Spanish	55.6	44.4
Weedpatch	2,788	CDP	2,543	Spanish	90.1	9.9
West Carson	22,240	CDP	21,263	English	46.5	46.5
West Covina	108,173	City	103,174	English	42.6	42.6
West Goshen	562	CDP	555	Spanish	74.6	15.3
Westley	602	CDP	495	Spanish	100	0
Westminster	90,638	City	85,820	Asian and Pacific Islander	44.7	35.6
West Modesto	5,438	CDP	5,097	Spanish	58.6	38.5
Westmont	35,345	CDP	32,734	Spanish	53.6	45.2
Westmorland	2,010	City	1,759	Spanish	74.4	25
West Park	1,148	CDP	987	Spanish	49.1	37.7
West Puente Valley	22,074	CDP	21,068	Spanish	58.7	29.6
Westside	191	CDP	171	Spanish	100	0
West Whittier-Los Nietos	25,442	CDP	24,153	Spanish	62.8	35
Williams	5,539	City	5,052	Spanish	71.4	28.3
Willowbrook	22,491	CDP	20,712	Spanish	69.7	29.3
Wilsonia	26	CDP	26	Other Indo-European	100	0
Winterhaven	53	CDP	53	Spanish	73.6	26.4
Winton	11,986	CDP	10,884	Spanish	71.6	25.1
Woodlake	7,495	City	6,798	Spanish	75.3	24.2
Woodville	1,830	CDP	1,646	Spanish	77.9	18.4
Woodville Farm Labor Camp	425	CDP	376	Spanish	100	0
Yettem	108	CDP	108	Spanish	100	0
Yolo	281	CDP	260	Spanish	71.2	28.8

=== Colorado ===
Community	Population	Type	Population of over five years	Plurality Language group	Percentage	English Percentage
Amherst	77	CDP	77	Spanish	100	0
Aristocrat Ranchettes	1,987	CDP	1,876	Spanish	50.6	49.4
Cattle Creek	538	CDP	500	Spanish	55.6	44.4
Center	2,349	Town	2,161	Spanish	56.6	42.8
Derby	9,009	CDP	8,437	Spanish	51.2	48.1
Dotsero	1,189	CDP	1,092	Spanish	64.2	35.8
Garden City	165	Town	163	Spanish	53.4	46.6
Gilcrest	1,082	Town	972	Spanish	52.1	47.7
Granada	482	Town	463	Spanish	55.9	44.1
North Washington	232	CDP	232	English	48.7	48.7
Olathe	1,901	Town	1,839	Spanish	53.7	46

=== Florida ===
Community	Population	Type	Population of over five years	Plurality Language group	Percentage	English Percentage
Acacia Villas	363	CDP	363	Spanish	55.9	44.1
Aventura	39,621	City	37,841	Spanish	47.4	32
Azalea Park	16,024	CDP	15,222	Spanish	55.6	40.1
Bal Harbour	3,035	Village	2,954	English	44.5	44.5
Bay Harbor Islands	5,843	Town	5,484	Spanish	54.4	29
Biscayne Park	3,098	Village	2,501	English	47.2	47.2
Broadview Park	7,385	CDP	6,996	Spanish	59	37
Brownsville	17,817	CDP	16,915	English	49.7	49.7
Buenaventura Lakes	33,284	CDP	31,910	Spanish	65.2	28.8
Canal Point	437	CDP	414	Spanish	54.6	45.4
Charleston Park	33	CDP	33	Spanish	87.9	12.1
Cobbtown	57	CDP	57	Spanish	96.5	3.5
Coral Gables	49,696	City	47,049	Spanish	53.7	38.4
Coral Terrace	24,597	CDP	23,354	Spanish	85.4	12.2
Country Club	50,975	CDP	48,549	Spanish	82.7	13.6
Country Walk	18,719	CDP	17,658	Spanish	71.9	22.6
Cutler Bay	44,738	Town	42,357	Spanish	59.3	35.1
Davenport	10,246	City	9,392	Spanish	46.2	40
Doral	74,891	City	70,733	Spanish	82.6	11.3
Dover	3,247	CDP	3,004	Spanish	51.3	47.4
Dundee	5,373	Town	4,731	Spanish	52.2	47.4
Egypt Lake-Leto	36,000	CDP	34,188	Spanish	59.7	34.7
El Portal	1,904	Village	1,686	Spanish	37.3	35.5
Fellsmere	4,885	City	4,350	Spanish	67.3	32.4
Florida City	12,841	City	11,550	Spanish	46.4	45.1
Fontainebleau	57,066	CDP	54,932	Spanish	88.3	8
Glenvar Heights	17,902	CDP	16,939	Spanish	65.8	29.1
Golden Beach	548	Town	531	Spanish	50.5	33.5
Golden Gate	29,400	CDP	27,196	Spanish	60.5	28.8
Golden Glades	34,725	CDP	32,474	Other Indo-European	47.4	30.9
Goulds	11,943	CDP	11,126	Spanish	50.6	45.9
Greenacres	43,651	City	40,794	English	44.5	44.5
Hallandale Beach	41,102	City	38,419	English	38.7	38.7
Harlem Heights	1,694	CDP	1,580	Spanish	50.6	47.5
Hialeah	222,996	City	212,560	Spanish	91.7	7.4
Hialeah Gardens	22,815	City	21,817	Spanish	93.3	6.6
Hollywood	152,764	City	145,621	English	48.9	48.9
Homestead	79,996	City	72,192	Spanish	57.7	33.9
Hunters Creek	19,895	CDP	19,142	English	44	44
Immokalee	27,753	CDP	25,391	Spanish	62.9	22.7
Indian Creek	54	Village	54	Spanish	50	18.5
Ives Estates	26,814	CDP	24,876	English	43.7	43.7
Kendale Lakes	52,661	CDP	50,981	Spanish	84	13.8
Kendall	78,402	CDP	74,501	Spanish	62	32.6
Kendall West	35,606	CDP	34,387	Spanish	88.2	8.3
Kenwood Estates	1,252	CDP	1,173	Spanish	79	18.9
Key Biscayne	14,572	Village	13,919	Spanish	74.1	17
Kissimmee	78,478	City	73,786	Spanish	62.2	30.9
Lake Belvedere Estates	2,867	CDP	2,589	English	47.5	47.5
Lake Worth Beach	42,188	City	39,858	English	42.7	42.7
Leisure City	27,033	CDP	25,142	Spanish	77	18.1
Limestone Creek	1,460	CDP	1,422	English	42.4	42.4
Meadow Woods	42,207	CDP	39,167	Spanish	52.3	40.3
Medley	1,018	Town	985	Spanish	83.7	16.3
Miami	443,665	City	419,095	Spanish	70	22.2
Miami Beach	82,400	City	78,828	Spanish	55.6	31
Miami Lakes	30,621	Town	29,184	Spanish	84.2	12.3
Miami Springs	13,729	City	12,760	Spanish	69.7	26.6
Montura	3,400	CDP	3,244	Spanish	71.9	28.1
Morriston	140	CDP	140	Spanish	77.1	22.9
Naples Manor	5,882	CDP	5,242	Spanish	58.5	10.9
Naranja	13,261	CDP	11,797	Spanish	51.7	44.7
North Bay Village	8,024	City	7,678	Spanish	61.4	17.9
North Miami	59,854	City	55,628	Other Indo-European	44	23.5
North Miami Beach	43,269	City	40,495	Spanish	40.5	27.7
Oak Ridge	24,476	CDP	23,344	Spanish	44.9	43
Ojus	16,450	CDP	15,673	Spanish	47.8	33.4
Olympia Heights	13,824	CDP	13,074	Spanish	81.6	17.8
Ona	435	CDP	435	Spanish	77.7	22.3
Opa-locka	16,230	City	15,273	English	49.1	49.1
Page Park	856	CDP	786	English	48.1	48.1
Palmetto Estates	16,776	CDP	15,730	Spanish	57.5	34.5
Palmona Park	1,112	CDP	1,060	Spanish	62.8	37.2
Palm Springs	26,692	Village	24,909	Spanish	55.3	28.8
Palm Springs North	5,303	CDP	4,933	Spanish	82.3	17.2
Pembroke Park	6,266	Town	5,596	English	33.7	33.7
Pembroke Pines	170,472	City	162,491	English	48	48
Pierson	1,332	Town	1,313	Spanish	58.3	41.2
Pine Air	2,318	CDP	2,182	Spanish	68.3	25.1
Pine Castle	9,556	CDP	8,959	Spanish	50.6	37.2
Pinecrest	18,279	Village	17,329	English	45.6	45.6
Pine Manor	3,944	CDP	3,799	Spanish	57.4	40
Pinewood	17,163	CDP	16,017	Other Indo-European	37.9	34
Pioneer	419	CDP	419	Spanish	57.5	42.5
Plantation Mobile Home Park	1,540	CDP	1,540	Spanish	51.4	43.4
Poinciana	69,311	CDP	65,380	Spanish	48.1	45.1
Port LaBelle	5,858	CDP	5,462	Spanish	67.5	32.5
Princeton	37,954	CDP	35,393	Spanish	69.9	26.2
Richmond West	36,964	CDP	35,378	Spanish	75	21.8
Royal Palm Estates	1,759	CDP	1,690	Spanish	58.9	41.1
Sky Lake	7,424	CDP	7,137	Spanish	62.1	35.9
Southchase	15,573	CDP	15,210	English	41.3	41.3
South Miami	11,944	City	11,138	Spanish	50.1	39.4
South Miami Heights	35,705	CDP	33,943	Spanish	70.7	26.9
Stacey Street	531	CDP	531	Other Indo-European	66.9	17.9
Sunny Isles Beach	22,202	City	21,291	Spanish	48.9	23.9
Sunset	13,877	CDP	13,010	Spanish	80.6	15.9
Surfside	5,625	Town	4,996	Spanish	43.9	35.4
Sweetwater	19,399	City	18,395	Spanish	90	8.8
Taft	1,604	CDP	1,596	Spanish	52.7	30.3
Tamiami	52,851	CDP	50,727	Spanish	90.8	7.6
The Crossings	22,708	CDP	21,609	Spanish	66	30.4
The Hammocks	59,843	CDP	57,000	Spanish	79.1	17
Three Lakes	16,596	CDP	15,234	Spanish	63.1	25.9
Tice	5,468	CDP	5,167	Spanish	58.6	39
Town 'n' Country	89,456	CDP	84,069	Spanish	47.1	45.9
Trilby	329	CDP	321	Asian and Pacific Islander	48	41.1
Virginia Gardens	2,419	Village	2,276	Spanish	73.6	26.4
Wahneta	4,406	CDP	4,183	Spanish	60.2	39.8
Westchester	53,765	CDP	51,397	Spanish	85.2	12.6
Westgate	8,340	CDP	7,635	Spanish	55.2	31
West Little River	33,465	CDP	31,174	Spanish	50.7	40
West Miami	7,104	City	6,438	Spanish	85.4	12.1
Weston	68,029	City	64,435	Spanish	54.6	32.9
West Perrine	10,597	CDP	9,793	Spanish	55.3	43.6
West Samoset	6,985	CDP	6,609	Spanish	48.7	43.5
Westview	10,992	CDP	10,560	English	45.7	45.7
Westwood Lakes	10,725	CDP	10,367	Spanish	85.3	13.9
Zolfo Springs	1,759	Town	1,692	Spanish	53.5	44.7

=== Georgia ===
Community	Population	Type	Population of over five years	Plurality Language group	Percentage	English Percentage
Alto	1,328	Town	1,236	Spanish	53.3	36.2
Argyle	504	Town	500	Spanish	61.2	38.8
Axson	381	CDP	381	Spanish	55.1	44.9
Baldwin	3,817	City	3,331	Spanish	59.9	38.1
Clarkston	14,553	City	12,671	English	49	49
Doraville	10,691	City	10,022	Spanish	40.5	34.2
Fair Oaks	9,614	CDP	8,905	Spanish	53.3	43.8
Lakeview Estates	2,714	CDP	2,563	Spanish	85.3	14.7
Lilburn	14,741	City	13,712	Spanish	41.4	39.3
Morrow	6,563	City	6,143	English	47.1	47.1
Omega	1,302	City	1,149	Spanish	54	45.5

=== Hawaii ===
Community	Population	Type	Population of over five years	Plurality Language group	Percentage	English Percentage
Halaula	959	CDP	895	Asian and Pacific Islander	48	43.6
Kaumakani	1,498	CDP	1,462	Asian and Pacific Islander	71.1	28.9
Kukuihaele	380	CDP	340	Asian and Pacific Islander	55.9	40.9
Pepeekeo	1,462	CDP	1,394	Asian and Pacific Islander	50.3	42.3
Tiki Gardens	324	CDP	324	English	47.8	47.8

=== Idaho ===
Community	Population	Type	Population of over five years	Plurality Language group	Percentage	English Percentage
Aberdeen	2,611	City	2,300	Spanish	75.5	23.9
Acequia	187	City	163	Spanish	50.9	49.1
Bliss	281	City	278	Spanish	50.4	49.6
Carey	1,244	City	1,140	Spanish	49.1	46.5
Castleford	196	City	178	Spanish	54.5	39.3
Gannett	316	CDP	316	Spanish	66.5	33.5
Hazelton	1,094	City	1,038	Spanish	53.9	46.1
Minidoka	175	City	147	Spanish	81.6	18.4
Wilder	1,672	City	1,572	Spanish	53.7	43.3

=== Illinois ===
Community	Population	Type	Population of over five years	Plurality Language group	Percentage	English Percentage
Addison	35,685	Village	34,276	English	44	44
Alden	168	CDP	149	Spanish	100	0
Berwyn	56,556	City	53,161	Spanish	49.1	45.5
Burbank	29,122	City	27,388	English	42.4	42.4
Carpentersville	37,834	Village	35,106	Spanish	47.7	43.2
Cicero	84,189	Town	79,624	Spanish	80	18.5
Eagle Lake	116	CDP	116	Asian and Pacific Islander	81	19
Fairmont City	2,125	Village	2,026	Spanish	55.4	44.6
Franklin Park	18,374	Village	17,530	Spanish	46.2	38.3
Glendale Heights	33,088	Village	31,088	English	43.1	43.1
Hanover Park	37,222	Village	35,052	English	44.1	44.1
Harwood Heights	8,942	Village	8,275	Other Indo-European	43.7	32.8
Hickory Hills	14,915	City	13,945	English	45.7	45.7
Kings	347	CDP	276	Spanish	54.7	45.3
Lincolnwood	13,268	Village	12,570	English	49.9	49.9
Marley	35	CDP	35	Asian and Pacific Islander	60	40
Melrose Park	25,177	Village	23,547	Spanish	69	27.9
Morton Grove	24,910	Village	23,793	English	49.7	49.7
Niles	30,637	Village	29,198	English	41.5	41.5
Norridge	15,291	Village	14,609	English	47.5	47.5
Northlake	12,683	City	12,312	Spanish	49.6	42.5
Onarga	1,288	Village	1,244	Spanish	54.3	44.9
Park City	7,702	City	7,427	Spanish	69.1	27.6
Posen	5,442	Village	5,040	Spanish	54.9	42.3
Prospect Heights	15,861	City	14,717	English	42.5	42.5
Rosemont	3,864	Village	3,687	Spanish	42.8	41.2
Schiller Park	11,600	Village	10,678	English	34.9	34.9
Stickney	7,031	Village	6,719	Spanish	58.6	40.1
Stone Park	4,566	Village	4,287	Spanish	81.8	16.3
Summit	11,036	Village	10,547	Spanish	62.7	29.1
Waukegan	89,435	City	84,166	English	47.1	47.1
West Chicago	25,632	City	24,402	English	47.6	47.6
Wheeling	38,823	Village	36,651	English	36	36

=== Indiana ===
Community	Population	Type	Population of over five years	Plurality Language group	Percentage	English Percentage
Ambia	230	Town	217	Spanish	60.8	39.2
Deputy	19	CDP	19	Spanish	57.9	42.1
Fair Oaks	317	CDP	264	Spanish	100	0
Hillisburg	84	CDP	74	Spanish	75.7	24.3
Ireland	77	CDP	63	Spanish	69.8	30.2
Ligonier	4,397	City	4,090	Spanish	50.1	48.8
Linn Grove	117	CDP	117	Spanish	94	6
Shipshewana Lake	259	CDP	249	Other Indo-European	56.6	43.4
Vistula	45	CDP	45	Other Indo-European	84.4	15.6

=== Iowa ===
Community	Population	Type	Population of over five years	Plurality Language group	Percentage	English Percentage
Chapin	137	CDP	137	Other Indo-European	64.2	35.8
Postville	2,653	City	2,414	English	49.3	49.3
Storm Lake	11,194	City	10,398	English	47.7	47.7

=== Kansas ===
Community	Population	Type	Population of over five years	Plurality Language group	Percentage	English Percentage
Deerfield	736	City	674	Spanish	55.6	44.4
Dodge City	27,721	City	25,338	Spanish	52.5	44.5
Liberal	19,099	City	17,413	Spanish	56.6	39.9
Plains	1,266	City	1,134	English	49.4	49.4
Shallow Water	56	CDP	34	Spanish	100	0

=== Kentucky ===
Community	Population	Type	Population of over five years	Plurality Language group	Percentage	English Percentage
Farmers	25	CDP	25	Other	68	32
Poplar Hills	519	City	437	Spanish	67.7	26.8

=== Louisiana ===
Community	Population	Type	Population of over five years	Plurality Language group	Percentage	English Percentage
Amelia	2,000	CDP	1,796	Spanish	49.9	37.8
Romeville	27	CDP	27	Other Indo-European	51.9	48.1

=== Maine ===
Community	Population	Type	Population of over five years	Plurality Language group	Percentage	English Percentage
Grand Isle	222	CDP	222	Other Indo-European	67.6	32.4
Madawaska	2,726	CDP	2,596	Other Indo-European	57	42.6

=== Maryland ===
Community	Population	Type	Population of over five years	Plurality Language group	Percentage	English Percentage
Adelphi	16,944	CDP	15,993	Spanish	48.4	27.8
Beltsville	19,704	CDP	18,200	English	46.5	46.5
Berwyn Heights	3,312	Town	2,946	English	45.7	45.7
Brentwood	3,782	Town	3,460	English	49.1	49.1
Burnt Mills	4,425	CDP	4,023	Spanish	41.1	34.5
Calverton	18,324	CDP	17,272	English	49.6	49.6
Cearfoss	147	CDP	147	Asian and Pacific Islander	70.7	29.3
Chillum	35,908	CDP	32,994	Spanish	46.2	36.5
Colmar Manor	1,516	Town	1,414	Spanish	52.4	34.3
Cottage City	1,115	Town	1,102	Spanish	45.6	39.9
East Riverdale	18,080	CDP	16,482	Spanish	60	32.8
Edmonston	1,751	Town	1,553	Spanish	60.5	35.5
Flower Hill	14,631	CDP	13,584	English	44	44
Gaithersburg	69,016	City	64,186	English	48	48
Glenmont	16,632	CDP	15,332	English	39.6	39.6
Henderson	149	Town	136	Spanish	58.8	41.2
Landover Hills	2,118	Town	1,977	Spanish	49.8	48.2
Langley Park	21,778	CDP	19,258	Spanish	79.9	12.4
Marydel	129	Town	103	Spanish	50.5	47.6
Montgomery Village	34,748	CDP	31,576	English	47.7	47.7
Redland	18,346	CDP	17,054	English	46.2	46.2
Riverdale Park	7,284	Town	6,896	Spanish	50.2	44.1
Spring Gap	42	CDP	42	Other Indo-European	66.7	33.3
Templeville	182	Town	150	Spanish	82	18
Wheaton	52,775	CDP	49,420	Spanish	40	38.5
White Oak	15,489	CDP	14,155	English	41.5	41.5
Woodlawn (Prince George's County)	7,515	CDP	6,701	English	47.9	47.9

=== Massachusetts ===
Community	Population	Type	Population of over five years	Plurality Language group	Percentage	English Percentage
Chelsea	39,890	City	36,865	Spanish	60.3	29
Everett	48,685	City	45,551	English	38.4	38.4
Lawrence	88,067	City	81,180	Spanish	73.9	22.1
Lynn	100,653	City	94,142	English	47.8	47.8
Revere	60,577	City	56,762	English	42.4	42.4

=== Michigan ===
Community	Population	Type	Population of over five years	Plurality Language group	Percentage	English Percentage
Dearborn	108,414	City	101,122	English	48.7	48.7
Hamtramck	27,842	City	25,312	Other	35.9	29.9

=== Minnesota ===
Community	Population	Type	Population of over five years	Plurality Language group	Percentage	English Percentage
Hilltop	1,005	City	907	English	42.7	42.7
Midway	32	CDP	29	English	41.4	41.4
Milan	398	City	360	English	46.4	46.4
Wilder	42	City	38	Spanish	68.4	31.6

=== Mississippi ===
Community	Population	Type	Population of over five years	Plurality Language group	Percentage	English Percentage
Bogue Chitto (Kemper and Neshoba Counties)	319	CDP	319	Other	68	32
Bolivar	49	CDP	49	Spanish	36.7	26.5
Conehatta	1,240	CDP	1,107	Other	63.1	36.6
Glen Allan	234	CDP	166	Spanish	56	44
Pearl River	4,298	CDP	3,982	Other	51.1	46

=== Montana ===
Community	Population	Type	Population of over five years	Plurality Language group	Percentage	English Percentage
Ginger Blue	113	Village	96	Spanish	81.3	18.8
Big Stone Colony	31	CDP	31	Other Indo-European	100	0
Birch Creek Colony	101	CDP	101	Other Indo-European	100	0
Camrose Colony	76	CDP	67	Other Indo-European	61.2	38.8
Cascade Colony	23	CDP	23	Other Indo-European	100	0
Deerfield Colony	17	CDP	17	Other Indo-European	100	0
Eagle Creek Colony	54	CDP	54	Other Indo-European	92.6	7.4
Fords Creek Colony	53	CDP	53	Other Indo-European	98.1	1.9
Gildford Colony	26	CDP	26	Other Indo-European	96.2	3.8
Glacier Colony	383	CDP	383	Other Indo-European	88.8	11.2
Golden Valley Colony	15	CDP	15	Other Indo-European	100	0
Hilldale Colony	25	CDP	25	Other Indo-European	100	0
King Ranch Colony	19	CDP	19	Other Indo-European	100	0
Kingsbury Colony	9	CDP	9	Asian and Pacific Islander	55.6	44.4
Loring Colony	15	CDP	15	Other Indo-European	100	0
Martinsdale Colony	22	CDP	22	Other Indo-European	100	0
Mountain View Colony	22	CDP	22	Other Indo-European	100	0
New Miami Colony	178	CDP	173	Other Indo-European	86.1	13.9
North Harlem Colony	57	CDP	57	Other Indo-European	100	0
Pleasant Valley Colony	45	CDP	30	Other Indo-European	100	0
Pondera Colony	40	CDP	40	Other Indo-European	85	15
Riverview Colony	265	CDP	217	Other Indo-European	97.7	2.3
Rockport Colony	34	CDP	34	Other Indo-European	100	0
Sage Creek Colony	23	CDP	23	Other Indo-European	100	0
St. Xavier	78	CDP	72	Other	41.7	38.9
Springwater Colony	25	CDP	25	Other Indo-European	100	0
Surprise Creek Colony	10	CDP	10	Other Indo-European	100	0
Turner Colony	63	CDP	63	Other Indo-European	87.3	12.7

=== Nebraska ===
Community	Population	Type	Population of over five years	Plurality Language group	Percentage	English Percentage
La Platte	151	CDP	135	Spanish	75.6	24.4
Lexington	10,662	City	9,691	Spanish	54	36.3
Madison	2,098	City	1,944	Spanish	52.7	43.7
Nickerson	542	Village	467	Spanish	55.5	44.5
Schuyler	6,516	City	5,884	Spanish	61.8	31.9
South Sioux City	13,835	City	12,775	English	47.7	47.7

=== Nevada ===
Community	Population	Type	Population of over five years	Plurality Language group	Percentage	English Percentage
Stateline	938	CDP	814	Spanish	50.4	40.8
West Wendover	4,513	City	4,074	Spanish	47.8	32.9
Winchester	37,531	CDP	35,343	English	49.1	49.1

=== New Jersey ===
Community	Population	Type	Population of over five years	Plurality Language group	Percentage	English Percentage
Ampere North	5,164	CDP	4,828	English	48.1	48.1
Belle Mead	5,867	CDP	5,475	English	48.5	48.5
Bergenfield	28,223	Borough	26,442	English	49.4	49.4
Bound Brook	11,906	Borough	11,114	English	47.6	47.6
Carteret	25,161	Borough	23,256	English	40.7	40.7
Cliffside Park	25,546	Borough	24,355	English	35	35
Clifton	89,451	City	84,565	English	43	43
Cresskill	9,105	Borough	8,762	English	47.8	47.8
Dayton	8,361	CDP	8,091	English	44.9	44.9
Deans	1,049	CDP	1,021	English	44.3	44.3
Dover	18,426	Town	17,690	Spanish	73.4	22.5
Dunellen	7,598	Borough	7,313	English	46.6	46.6
East Franklin	9,309	CDP	8,525	Spanish	49	41.2
East Newark	2,718	Borough	2,612	Spanish	64.4	13.8
East Rutherford	10,020	Borough	9,122	English	49.8	49.8
Edgewater	14,394	Borough	13,560	English	45.9	45.9
Elizabeth	135,665	City	125,572	Spanish	61.6	23.6
Elmwood Park	21,261	Borough	19,875	English	43.6	43.6
Englewood Cliffs	5,347	Borough	5,127	English	46.3	46.3
Fairview	14,935	Borough	14,200	Spanish	50	33.1
Forsgate	2,300	CDP	2,191	English	39.5	39.5
Fort Lee	39,799	Borough	37,580	English	39.7	39.7
Garfield	32,472	City	30,553	Spanish	35.9	33.1
Guttenberg	11,765	Town	10,954	Spanish	64.3	23.4
Hackensack	45,758	City	43,379	English	48.6	48.6
Haledon	8,945	Borough	8,391	English	45.5	45.5
Harlingen	429	CDP	403	English	49.9	49.9
Harrison	19,217	Town	18,034	Spanish	39	31.8
Heathcote	6,773	CDP	6,398	English	44.5	44.5
Hopelawn	2,910	CDP	2,871	Spanish	43.7	39.6
Iselin	18,511	CDP	17,765	Other Indo-European	41.7	39.8
Jersey City	287,899	City	267,423	English	48.6	48.6
Kearny	41,157	Town	38,459	Spanish	45.3	32.2
Keasbey	2,745	CDP	2,592	Spanish	63.6	24.3
Leonia	9,273	Borough	8,734	English	46.6	46.6
Linden	43,478	City	41,024	English	45.1	45.1
Little Ferry	10,954	Borough	10,436	English	44.1	44.1
Lodi	25,969	Borough	24,772	English	46.7	46.7
Menlo Park Terrace	3,117	CDP	2,845	English	44.5	44.5
Mizpah	297	CDP	280	English	43.6	43.6
Monmouth Junction	9,750	CDP	9,204	English	46.9	46.9
Monroe Manor	2,549	CDP	2,411	Other Indo-European	44.4	36.3
Moonachie	3,093	Borough	2,884	Spanish	52.2	32.5
Newark	307,355	City	286,785	English	49.5	49.5
New Brunswick	55,718	City	52,823	English	45.7	45.7
North Plainfield	22,695	Borough	21,088	English	45.5	45.5
Palisades Park	20,231	Borough	19,215	Asian and Pacific Islander	51.6	25.1
Parsippany	21,806	CDP	20,838	English	48.6	48.6
Passaic	70,048	City	64,265	Spanish	67.9	26.6
Paterson	157,864	City	145,422	Spanish	56.7	34.2
Perth Amboy	55,226	City	51,352	Spanish	76.9	19.4
Plainfield	54,358	City	50,202	Spanish	50.1	44.5
Pleasantville	20,562	City	18,836	English	48	48
Princeton Meadows	15,585	CDP	14,735	English	39.8	39.8
Prospect Park	6,299	Borough	5,778	Spanish	50.6	38.4
Ridgefield	11,465	Borough	11,173	English	37.4	37.4
Ridgefield Park	13,161	Village	12,256	English	45.1	45.1
Secaucus	21,470	Town	20,414	English	45.7	45.7
Silver Lake (Essex County)	4,407	CDP	4,019	Spanish	45.8	36.2
Springfield	1,461	CDP	1,376	English	44.3	44.3
Ten Mile Run	2,241	CDP	2,164	Other Indo-European	49.3	40.2
Troy Hills	5,206	CDP	4,928	English	48.6	48.6
Union	2,974	CDP	2,941	Other Indo-European	48.1	20.9
Union City	67,258	City	63,164	Spanish	75.1	18.6
Victory Gardens	1,761	Borough	1,654	Spanish	73.3	23.3
Voorhees	1,798	CDP	1,616	English	45.9	45.9
Wallington	11,838	Borough	11,173	Other Indo-European	48.9	33.5
West New York	52,438	Town	50,062	Spanish	68.2	22.3
Wharton	7,217	Borough	6,563	English	48.4	48.4

=== New Mexico ===
Community	Population	Type	Population of over five years	Plurality Language group	Percentage	English Percentage
Alamo	1,081	CDP	1,006	Other	89.6	9.1
Alcalde	235	CDP	217	Spanish	58.5	40.1
Anthony	8,708	City	8,085	Spanish	88.8	11.1
Anton Chico	188	CDP	177	Spanish	71.8	28.2
Aragon	142	CDP	142	Spanish	54.9	45.1
Arroyo Hondo (Taos County)	127	CDP	127	Spanish	54.3	45.7
Atoka	1,280	CDP	1,148	Spanish	55.6	44.4
Becenti	275	CDP	269	Other	55.8	44.2
Beclabito	238	CDP	232	Other	55.6	38.8
Berino	1,250	CDP	1,238	Spanish	93.9	6.1
Black Rock	1,259	CDP	1,183	Other	79	19
Borrego Pass	107	CDP	106	Other	60.4	39.6
Butterfield Park	596	CDP	596	Spanish	67.8	32.2
Canjilon	138	CDP	138	Spanish	100	0
Cañones	82	CDP	82	Spanish	100	0
Canova	589	CDP	509	Spanish	53.8	46.2
Causey	203	Village	179	Spanish	82.1	17.9
Chamberino	720	CDP	707	Spanish	87.8	12.2
Chamisal	358	CDP	349	English	49.6	49.6
Chamita	841	CDP	795	Spanish	60.5	36.5
Chamizal	50	CDP	50	Spanish	100	0
Chaparral	15,290	CDP	14,393	Spanish	75	24.3
Chical	212	CDP	212	Other	68.9	31.1
Chili	220	CDP	220	Spanish	90	10
Chimayo	2,955	CDP	2,820	Spanish	72	28
Church Rock	1,395	CDP	1,298	Other	50.3	49.7
Cobre	32	CDP	32	Spanish	100	0
Cochiti	484	CDP	448	Other	63.8	32.8
Columbus	1,281	Village	1,273	Spanish	86.8	13.2
Continental Divide	141	CDP	141	Other	87.9	12.1
Cordova	180	CDP	180	Spanish	100	0
Cotton City	402	CDP	378	Spanish	57.7	42.3
Coyote	32	CDP	32	Spanish	100	0
Crownpoint	2,823	CDP	2,764	Other	58.1	41.1
Cuartelez	433	CDP	266	Spanish	92.9	7.1
Cuyamungue Grant	361	CDP	344	Spanish	57.3	42.2
Deming	14,756	City	13,366	Spanish	55.2	43.6
Dexter	1,025	Town	967	Spanish	56.4	43.6
Dixon	1,049	CDP	1,001	Spanish	55.4	44.6
Doña Ana	1,344	CDP	1,298	Spanish	52.2	47.8
Duran	18	CDP	18	Spanish	100	0
El Cerro Mission	4,999	CDP	4,684	Spanish	55.7	44.3
El Duende	1,113	CDP	1,058	Spanish	66	33.9
El Rito	975	CDP	810	Spanish	96.2	3.7
El Valle de Arroyo Seco	1,744	CDP	1,699	Spanish	72.4	27.6
Encinal	230	CDP	204	Other	57.8	42.2
Ensenada	294	CDP	294	Spanish	100	0
Española	10,473	City	9,926	Spanish	56.5	39.8
Fort Sumner	1,206	Village	986	Spanish	58.3	40.4
Gamerco	1,489	CDP	1,063	Spanish	39.7	36.6
Garfield	77	CDP	77	Spanish	100	0
Glen Acres	306	CDP	294	Spanish	64.3	35.7
Hagerman	730	Town	677	Spanish	52.1	43.3
Hatch	1,673	Village	1,587	Spanish	70	28.8
Haystack	174	CDP	173	Other	57.8	42.2
Hernandez	902	CDP	844	Spanish	66.9	33.1
Isleta	745	CDP	690	Other	68.8	29.7
Iyanbito	1,119	CDP	1,050	Other	55.8	44.2
Jamestown	229	CDP	174	English	43.7	43.7
Jemez Pueblo	2,070	CDP	1,918	Other	87.3	12.5
La Bajada	16	CDP	16	Spanish	100	0
La Cienega	3,948	CDP	3,744	Spanish	52.6	46.4
Laguna	655	CDP	631	Other	55.8	44.2
La Jara	361	CDP	336	Spanish	55.1	35.7
La Joya	143	CDP	143	English	44.1	44.1
Lake Roberts	49	CDP	49	Spanish	67.3	32.7
La Madera (Rio Arriba County)	214	CDP	214	Spanish	100	0
La Mesa	650	CDP	598	Spanish	67.2	32.8
La Puebla	1,036	CDP	988	Spanish	66.6	33.4
Las Nutrias	90	CDP	90	Spanish	68.9	31.1
La Union	869	CDP	869	Spanish	63.8	36.2
Lemitar	533	CDP	494	Spanish	61.3	38.7
Los Luceros	731	CDP	731	Spanish	59.5	40.5
Los Ojos	19	CDP	19	Spanish	100	0
Lovington	11,495	City	10,382	Spanish	50.6	48.7
Lybrook	340	CDP	340	Other	100	0
Manuelito	41	CDP	39	Other	94.9	5.1
Meadow Lake	4,745	CDP	4,610	Spanish	52	45.2
Medanales	170	CDP	170	Spanish	77.1	0
Mesita	1,270	CDP	1,173	Other	58.6	37
Mesquite	597	CDP	592	Spanish	100	0
Morningside	573	CDP	573	Spanish	59.5	40.5
Mosquero	24	Village	24	Spanish	54.2	45.8
Mountain View (Cibola County)	67	CDP	67	Other	85.1	14.9
Nageezi	319	CDP	302	Other	59.3	38.1
Nakaibito	215	CDP	207	Other	55.1	43
Naschitti	343	CDP	335	Other	51.9	47.5
Nenahnezad	438	CDP	426	Other	55.4	44.6
Newcomb	435	CDP	422	Other	55.9	40.3
North Acomita Village	229	CDP	228	Other	72.4	27.6
North Hurley	91	CDP	91	Spanish	62.6	16.5
Ohkay Owingeh	1,173	CDP	1,144	Other	69.1	21.8
Ojo Amarillo	413	CDP	384	Other	59.6	40.4
Ojo Encino	445	CDP	401	Other	58.9	37.4
Ojo Sarco	281	CDP	281	Spanish	64.1	35.9
Pajarito Mesa	225	CDP	225	Spanish	80.9	19.1
Pastura	3	CDP	3	Spanish	100	0
Peak Place	473	CDP	397	Spanish	57.7	32
Pecos	885	Village	867	Spanish	61.2	38.8
Peña Blanca	688	CDP	677	Spanish	53.6	38.7
Picuris Pueblo	75	CDP	75	Other	77.3	22.7
Pinedale	755	CDP	710	Other	53.2	46.8
Pinehaven	7	CDP	7	Spanish	100	0
Pinehill	391	CDP	349	Other	62.8	33.5
Placitas (Doña Ana County)	515	CDP	433	Spanish	100	0
Pueblo Pintado	217	CDP	203	Other	82.8	17.2
Pulpotio Bareas	93	CDP	93	Spanish	61.3	38.7
Purty Rock	2	CDP	2	Other	100	0
Questa	2,179	Village	2,081	Spanish	59.7	39.6
Ranchos de Taos	2,313	CDP	2,113	Spanish	53.4	41.4
Ribera	330	CDP	284	Spanish	67.3	32.7
Rincon	267	CDP	267	Spanish	84.3	15.7
Rio Chiquito	211	CDP	211	Spanish	100	0
Rio Lucio	621	CDP	612	Spanish	68.6	30.4
Rivers	35	CDP	35	Spanish	100	0
Rock Springs	999	CDP	968	Other	57.9	35.5
Rodeo	50	CDP	50	Spanish	54	46
Rodey	390	CDP	390	Spanish	50.8	49.2
Rowe	582	CDP	582	Spanish	91.1	8.9
Salem	844	CDP	818	Spanish	97.2	2.8
San Antonio	70	CDP	70	Spanish	75.7	24.3
San Felipe Pueblo	1,430	CDP	1,336	Other	73.1	23.4
San Fidel	4	CDP	4	Other	50	0
San Jose (Rio Arriba County)	845	CDP	785	Spanish	55.7	42.5
San Miguel	594	CDP	583	Spanish	82.5	17.5
Sanostee	276	CDP	272	Other	76.5	23.5
Santa Ana Pueblo	1,006	CDP	933	Other	67.4	30.4
Santa Clara Pueblo	957	CDP	903	Other	56.3	29.2
Santa Teresa	6,396	CDP	5,817	Spanish	59.7	39.7
Santo Domingo Pueblo	2,021	CDP	1,861	Other	94.7	5.3
Seboyeta	516	CDP	466	Spanish	50.2	40.3
Sheep Springs	362	CDP	334	Other	53	47
Skyline-Ganipa	1,132	CDP	1,063	Other	51.4	46.4
Soham	242	CDP	242	Spanish	75.6	24.4
Sombrillo	120	CDP	105	Spanish	77.1	22.9
South Acomita Village	125	CDP	125	Other	40	31.2
Stanley	44	CDP	44	Spanish	77.3	22.7
Stoneridge	2	CDP	2	Other	100	0
Sunland Park	16,773	City	15,168	Spanish	83.1	15.8
Taos Pueblo	1,422	CDP	1,263	Other	73.9	23.8
Tecolotito	496	CDP	464	Spanish	57.1	42.9
Tesuque Pueblo	481	CDP	460	Other	61.7	24.8
Tortugas	708	CDP	668	Spanish	51.3	39.5
Truchas	320	CDP	320	Spanish	51.9	42.2
Tse Bonito	140	CDP	138	Other	100	0
Upper Fruitland	1,533	CDP	1,480	Other	50.7	48.7
Vadito	362	CDP	350	Spanish	51.7	47.7
Vado	3,386	CDP	3,162	Spanish	81.8	18.2
Valle Vista	796	CDP	785	Spanish	59.6	40.4
Vaughn	496	Town	486	Spanish	71.2	28.8
Veguita	31	CDP	31	Spanish	100	0
Velarde	287	CDP	244	Spanish	68.9	31.1
Ventura	808	CDP	808	Spanish	49.6	48.9
Villanueva	433	CDP	433	Spanish	74.1	13.9
Watrous	59	CDP	59	Spanish	100	0
White Cliffs	610	CDP	568	English	45.2	45.2
Williams Acres	682	CDP	504	Spanish	76.8	2
Youngsville	52	CDP	52	Spanish	100	0
Zia Pueblo	899	CDP	816	Other	65.7	34.3
Zuni Pueblo	6,789	CDP	6,484	Other	86.7	13

=== New York ===
Community	Population	Type	Population of over five years	Plurality Language group	Percentage	English Percentage
Bellerose Terrace	2,135	CDP	2,072	Other Indo-European	35.6	30
Bloomingburg	962	Village	716	Other Indo-European	68.7	20.9
Brentwood	65,042	CDP	61,075	Spanish	62	31.4
Brewster	2,506	Village	2,415	Spanish	49.9	48.1
Central Islip	36,519	CDP	34,110	Spanish	51.8	42.6
Flanders	6,411	CDP	5,571	Spanish	49.6	46
Forest Home	1,107	CDP	976	Asian and Pacific Islander	46.9	44.4
Great Neck Gardens	1,139	CDP	1,130	Asian and Pacific Islander	35.8	33.8
Haverstraw	12,286	Village	11,229	Spanish	49.4	41.1
Hillcrest	8,178	CDP	7,606	English	37.4	37.4
Inwood	11,156	CDP	10,068	English	41.1	41.1
Kaser	5,501	Village	4,221	Other Indo-European	94.6	3.7
Kiryas Joel	34,368	Village	27,525	Other Indo-European	88.3	7.9
Mongaup Valley	212	CDP	184	Other Indo-European	62.5	37.5
Monsey	28,287	CDP	22,882	Other Indo-European	77.8	19.2
New Cassel	15,127	CDP	13,780	Spanish	52.9	34.2
New Square	9,578	Village	8,071	Other Indo-European	91.8	5.5
North Bay Shore	18,392	CDP	17,212	Spanish	54	35.8
Port Chester	31,288	Village	29,420	Spanish	56.9	37
Saltaire	2	Village	2	Other Indo-European	100	0
Searingtown	4,700	CDP	4,542	English	42	42
Sleepy Hollow	10,396	Village	9,875	Spanish	49.5	39.5
South Blooming Grove	3,858	Village	3,528	English	47.1	47.1
South Fallsburg	1,938	CDP	1,728	English	49.4	49.4
South Floral Park	1,928	Village	1,853	English	47.7	47.7
Spring Valley	32,963	Village	29,399	Other Indo-European	44.4	26.6
Stony Brook University	8,755	CDP	8,755	English	44	44
Viola	7,385	CDP	7,062	English	49.5	49.5
West Haverstraw	10,649	Village	9,807	English	48.8	48.8

=== North Carolina ===
Community	Population	Type	Population of over five years	Plurality Language group	Percentage	English Percentage
Bowdens	271	CDP	210	Spanish	61.4	38.6
Gorman	1,473	CDP	1,408	Spanish	56	44
Siler City	7,847	Town	7,469	English	49.4	49.4
Warsaw	2,743	Town	2,491	English	48.3	48.3

=== North Dakota ===
Community	Population	Type	Population of over five years	Plurality Language group	Percentage	English Percentage
Ardoch	20	City	20	Spanish	55	45

=== Ohio ===
Community	Population	Type	Population of over five years	Plurality Language group	Percentage	English Percentage
Mount Hope	148	CDP	140	Other Indo-European	89.3	10.7

=== Oklahoma ===
Community	Population	Type	Population of over five years	Plurality Language group	Percentage	English Percentage
Baker	97	CDP	97	Spanish	91.8	8.2
Eakly	460	Town	397	Spanish	61.5	38.5
Gate	90	Town	88	Spanish	65.9	34.1
Hardesty	373	Town	373	Spanish	86.3	13.7
Knowles	11	Town	11	Other Indo-European	54.5	45.5
Mehan	68	CDP	68	Spanish	91.2	8.8
Optima	237	Town	217	Spanish	87.1	12.9
Ringwood	532	Town	496	Spanish	52.6	47.4
Rosston	31	Town	29	Spanish	72.4	27.6
Tyrone	1,082	Town	1,041	Spanish	59.8	40.2
White Water	37	CDP	37	Other	64.9	35.1

=== Oregon ===
Community	Population	Type	Population of over five years	Plurality Language group	Percentage	English Percentage
Boardman	3,830	City	3,476	Spanish	59.7	37
Gervais	2,605	City	2,494	Spanish	56	42.5
Hayesville	21,822	CDP	20,230	English	49.9	49.9
Labish Village	496	CDP	442	Spanish	78.7	21.3
Malin	881	City	761	Spanish	71.1	28.5
Mount Hood	360	CDP	326	Spanish	74.8	25.2
Odell	3,003	CDP	2,799	Spanish	59.3	40.7
Woodburn	26,222	City	24,665	Spanish	52	43.7

=== Pennsylvania ===
Community	Population	Type	Population of over five years	Plurality Language group	Percentage	English Percentage
Atlantic	64	CDP	60	Other Indo-European	61.7	38.3
Avondale	1,275	Borough	1,135	Spanish	62.8	31.6
Barrville	58	CDP	58	Other Indo-European	100	0
Churchtown	452	CDP	395	Other Indo-European	52.9	47.1
Hazleton	29,671	City	27,842	Spanish	54.7	42.9
Intercourse	1,691	CDP	1,652	Other Indo-European	60.7	39.3
Millbourne	1,425	Borough	1,342	Other Indo-European	38.5	31.8
Reading	94,601	City	87,197	Spanish	50.8	46.9
Ronco	39	CDP	39	Other	66.7	33.3
Toughkenamon	939	CDP	903	Spanish	62.2	37.8
West Hazleton	5,130	Borough	4,759	Spanish	56	43.2

=== Rhode Island ===
Community	Population	Type	Population of over five years	Plurality Language group	Percentage	English Percentage
Central Falls	22,359	City	20,484	Spanish	60	30.1

=== South Carolina ===
Community	Population	Type	Population of over five years	Plurality Language group	Percentage	English Percentage
Arcadia	2,846	CDP	2,554	English	47	47
Luray	176	Town	176	Spanish	64.8	35.2

=== South Dakota ===
Community	Population	Type	Population of over five years	Plurality Language group	Percentage	English Percentage
Brentwood Colony	66	CDP	66	Other Indo-European	100	0
Cameron Colony	45	CDP	45	Other Indo-European	100	0
Clark Colony	62	CDP	42	Other Indo-European	85.7	14.3
Clearfield Colony	40	CDP	40	Other Indo-European	100	0
Cloverleaf Colony	14	CDP	14	Other Indo-European	100	0
Glendale Colony	203	CDP	203	Other Indo-European	75.4	24.6
Grassland Colony	18	CDP	18	Other Indo-European	100	0
Jamesville Colony	39	CDP	39	Other Indo-European	100	0
Kaylor	15	CDP	15	Other Indo-European	53.3	46.7
Mayfield Colony	53	CDP	53	Other Indo-European	100	0
Millbrook Colony	12	CDP	6	Other Indo-European	100	0
Millerdale Colony	86	CDP	56	Other Indo-European	100	0
Old Elm Spring Colony	39	CDP	39	Other Indo-European	100	0
Prairie City	22	CDP	22	Asian and Pacific Islander	72.7	27.3
Rockport Colony	27	CDP	27	Other Indo-European	100	0
Shamrock Colony	51	CDP	51	Other Indo-European	100	0
Shannon Colony	27	CDP	27	Other Indo-European	100	0
Sicangu	232	CDP	232	Other	56	44
Spink Colony	47	CDP	47	Other Indo-European	100	0
Spring Creek	159	CDP	148	Other	93.9	6.1
Spring Creek Colony	125	CDP	125	Other Indo-European	100	0
Spring Lake Colony	41	CDP	41	Other Indo-European	100	0
Sunset Colony	54	CDP	54	Other Indo-European	100	0
Tschetter Colony	57	CDP	57	Other Indo-European	100	0

=== Texas ===
Community	Population	Type	Population of over five years	Plurality Language group	Percentage	English Percentage
Abram	1,952	CDP	1,656	Spanish	96.1	3.9
Acala	31	CDP	31	Spanish	100	0
Ackerly	387	City	362	Spanish	55	45
Agua Dulce (El Paso County)	2,681	CDP	2,555	Spanish	93	7
Airport Heights	142	CDP	142	Spanish	100	0
Airport Road Addition	151	CDP	151	Spanish	76.2	23.8
Alamo	19,811	City	18,062	Spanish	73.1	26.6
Aldine	15,511	CDP	14,226	Spanish	79.4	20
Alice	17,916	City	16,876	Spanish	50	49.1
Alto Bonito Heights	726	CDP	541	Spanish	100	0
Alton	18,493	City	16,706	Spanish	87.8	12
Amargosa	364	CDP	364	Spanish	65.9	34.1
Amherst	1,015	City	986	Spanish	59.6	40.4
Amistad	78	CDP	78	Spanish	57.7	42.3
Anthony	3,811	Town	3,398	Spanish	78.3	21.5
Arcola	2,604	City	2,394	Spanish	61.2	38.8
Arroyo Colorado Estates	764	CDP	716	Spanish	88.7	11.3
Arroyo Gardens	316	CDP	304	Spanish	91.4	8.6
Asherton	645	City	635	Spanish	90.9	9
B and E	83	CDP	83	Spanish	100	0
Banquete	455	CDP	422	Spanish	60.7	39.3
Barrera	331	CDP	207	Spanish	100	0
Barstow	313	City	268	Spanish	88.8	11.2
Batesville	1,124	CDP	990	Spanish	57.2	42.8
Beasley	984	City	924	Spanish	50.4	49.6
Benjamin Perez	110	CDP	110	Spanish	100	0
Bigfoot	1,012	CDP	1,012	Spanish	75.8	24.2
Big Lake	2,977	City	2,679	Spanish	49.1	48.2
Big Wells	432	City	417	Spanish	59.2	37.6
Bledsoe	104	CDP	97	Spanish	76.3	23.7
Blue Berry Hill	705	CDP	677	Spanish	82.9	17.1
Bluetown	619	CDP	567	Spanish	74.1	25.9
Booker	1,398	Town	1,272	Spanish	51.7	45.9
Botines	13	CDP	13	Spanish	100	0
Bovina	1,338	City	1,243	Spanish	80.5	19.5
Box Canyon	80	CDP	80	Spanish	75	25
Brackettville	1,408	City	1,273	Spanish	55.5	44.5
Brownsville	186,999	City	172,650	Spanish	84.2	14.9
Bruni	447	CDP	431	Spanish	70.3	29.7
Butterfield	226	CDP	226	Spanish	92	8
Cactus	3,055	City	2,692	Spanish	69.7	11.4
Camargito	258	CDP	258	Spanish	96.9	3.1
Cameron Park	5,830	CDP	5,449	Spanish	93.7	6.3
Campo Verde	197	CDP	197	Spanish	100	0
Canutillo	6,800	CDP	6,067	Spanish	67	31.8
Carrizo Hill	1,232	CDP	1,011	Spanish	59.7	40.3
Carrizo Springs	4,888	City	4,577	Spanish	55.4	43.9
Catarina	65	CDP	65	Spanish	100	0
César Chávez	1,817	CDP	1,742	Spanish	78.5	21.5
Channelview	43,204	CDP	39,924	Spanish	64.3	33.3
Chaparrito	202	CDP	202	Spanish	100	0
Chilton	1,095	CDP	1,021	English	48.2	48.2
Christine	213	Town	211	Spanish	70.6	29.4
Chula Vista (Cameron County)	121	CDP	121	Spanish	69.4	30.6
Chula Vista (Maverick County)	4,317	CDP	4,126	Spanish	95.4	4.6
Chula Vista (Zavala County)	416	CDP	416	Spanish	68.5	31.5
Cienegas Terrace	1,653	CDP	1,559	Spanish	86.9	13.1
Citrus City	2,920	CDP	2,856	Spanish	85.5	14.5
Clint	1,010	Town	903	Spanish	64.9	32.1
Cloverleaf	24,735	CDP	22,828	Spanish	71	28.1
Cockrell Hill	3,799	City	3,552	Spanish	69.2	30.8
Colorado Acres	74	CDP	62	Spanish	100	0
Combes	3,141	Town	2,948	English	48.2	48.2
Concepcion	14	CDP	14	Spanish	100	0
Cotulla	3,714	City	3,599	Spanish	60	40
Coyanosa	82	CDP	42	Spanish	100	0
Coyote Acres	678	CDP	642	Spanish	53.3	46.7
Crystal City	6,332	City	5,878	Spanish	72.6	27.4
Deerwood	1,649	CDP	1,542	Spanish	59.5	40.5
Dell City	82	City	82	Spanish	67.1	32.9
Delmita	164	CDP	159	Spanish	63.5	36.5
Del Rio	34,722	City	32,002	Spanish	66.9	32.7
Del Sol	267	CDP	267	Spanish	76.4	23.6
Denver City	4,418	Town	4,010	Spanish	64.7	34.9
Dilley	3,342	City	3,091	Spanish	51.2	48.6
Dimmitt	4,169	City	3,855	Spanish	58.6	40.6
Doffing	5,209	CDP	4,652	Spanish	93.1	6.9
Donna	16,742	City	15,384	Spanish	79.9	20
Doolittle	6,019	CDP	5,142	Spanish	97.4	2.6
Eagle Pass	28,166	City	25,495	Spanish	86.3	13.6
East Alto Bonito	522	CDP	489	Spanish	97.1	2.9
Edcouch	2,754	City	2,574	Spanish	95.9	4.1
Edgewater Estates	21	CDP	21	Spanish	100	0
Edinburg	100,964	City	93,710	Spanish	69.4	27.7
Edmonson	114	Town	111	Spanish	58.6	41.4
Eidson Road	9,685	CDP	8,667	Spanish	90.1	9.4
El Brazil	37	CDP	37	Spanish	100	0
El Castillo	140	CDP	87	Spanish	100	0
El Cenizo	426	CDP	358	Spanish	100	0
El Cenizo	2,226	City	2,024	Spanish	93.8	6.2
El Chaparral	153	CDP	142	Spanish	100	0
Elm Creek	3,559	CDP	3,350	Spanish	95.9	4.1
E. Lopez	84	CDP	84	Spanish	100	0
El Paso	677,181	City	631,697	Spanish	64.8	33
El Quiote	115	CDP	115	Spanish	94.8	5.2
El Refugio	737	CDP	629	Spanish	84.4	15.6
Elsa	5,721	City	5,286	Spanish	87.6	12.4
El Socio	27	CDP	27	Spanish	100	0
Encantada-Ranchito-El Calaboz	2,063	CDP	1,935	Spanish	87.9	12.1
Encinal	1,338	City	1,304	Spanish	72.7	27.3
Encino	102	CDP	102	Spanish	86.3	13.7
Escobares	2,578	City	2,311	Spanish	90.2	9.8
Eugenio Saenz	309	CDP	265	Spanish	100	0
Evergreen	88	CDP	88	Spanish	100	0
Fabens	5,303	CDP	5,076	Spanish	83.3	13.2
Fabrica	918	CDP	843	Spanish	100	0
Falconaire	19	CDP	19	Spanish	100	0
Falcon Lake Estates	1,037	CDP	1,009	Spanish	76.6	23.4
Falfurrias	4,348	City	4,149	Spanish	76.3	22.1
Fifth Street	1,523	CDP	1,450	Spanish	66	34
Flatonia	1,801	Town	1,721	Spanish	50.6	47.5
Flowella	25	CDP	25	Spanish	100	0
Floydada	2,670	City	2,454	Spanish	49.3	49.1
Fluvanna	72	CDP	72	Spanish	83.3	16.7
Fort Hancock	1,213	CDP	1,162	Spanish	92.9	7.1
Four Corners	11,504	CDP	10,997	English	38.4	38.4
Friona	4,125	City	3,888	Spanish	59	40.3
Fronton	264	CDP	225	Spanish	100	0
Fronton Ranchettes	140	CDP	140	Spanish	100	0
Galena Park	10,641	City	9,693	Spanish	81.7	18
Garceno	67	CDP	67	Spanish	100	0
Garciasville	223	CDP	197	Spanish	100	0
Garland	244,026	City	228,916	English	48.1	48.1
Garrett	1,069	Town	971	Spanish	51.7	48.1
Garza-Salinas II	513	CDP	443	Spanish	93	7
Granjeno	296	City	296	Spanish	93.6	6.4
Green Valley Farms	468	CDP	468	Spanish	81.4	18.6
Gregory	2,077	City	1,895	Spanish	60	39.9
Guadalupe Guerra	55	CDP	55	Spanish	100	0
Gutierrez	9	CDP	9	Spanish	100	0
Hargill	838	CDP	745	Spanish	83.9	16.1
Hart	1,070	City	978	Spanish	61.7	38.3
Havana	248	CDP	248	Spanish	100	0
Hebbronville	4,355	CDP	3,645	Spanish	59.5	39.1
Heidelberg	1,703	CDP	1,629	Spanish	90.5	9.5
Hereford	14,943	City	13,653	Spanish	57	42.8
Hidalgo	14,075	City	12,967	Spanish	95.3	4.5
Hillside Acres	7	CDP	7	Spanish	100	0
Hilltop (Starr County)	276	CDP	147	Spanish	100	0
Holiday Lakes	834	Town	801	Spanish	54.9	45.1
Homestead Meadows North	6,707	CDP	6,302	Spanish	83.6	16.1
Homestead Meadows South	7,861	CDP	6,847	Spanish	94.6	5.3
Horizon City	22,537	City	20,813	Spanish	76.9	22.7
Hornsby Bend	11,031	CDP	10,358	Spanish	50.2	42.9
Iglesia Antigua	92	CDP	92	Spanish	100	0
Impact	12	Town	12	Spanish	83.3	16.7
Indian Hills	3,188	CDP	2,918	Spanish	95.2	4.8
Irving	254,962	City	233,801	English	39.4	39.4
Jacinto City	9,589	City	9,016	Spanish	75.7	23.9
J.F. Villareal	329	CDP	329	Spanish	100	0
Juarez	655	CDP	655	Spanish	57.6	42.4
K-Bar Ranch	611	CDP	538	Spanish	81.8	18.2
Kermit	5,984	City	5,546	Spanish	53.5	46.5
La Blanca	3,326	CDP	2,953	Spanish	86.3	13.7
La Carla	85	CDP	85	Spanish	100	0
La Chuparosa	46	CDP	46	Spanish	100	0
La Coma Heights	172	CDP	150	Spanish	100	0
La Escondida	297	CDP	297	Spanish	89.2	10.8
La Esperanza	255	CDP	255	Spanish	100	0
La Feria	6,848	City	6,218	Spanish	51.4	48.6
La Feria North	243	CDP	227	Spanish	92.5	7.5
Lago	27	CDP	27	Spanish	100	0
Lago Vista	88	CDP	88	Spanish	85.2	14.8
La Grulla	1,375	City	1,325	Spanish	91.1	8.9
Laguna Seca	277	CDP	255	Spanish	83.9	16.1
La Homa	10,661	CDP	9,600	Spanish	91.9	7.6
La Joya	4,525	City	4,114	Spanish	88.9	8.3
La Loma de Falcon	51	CDP	51	Spanish	100	0
La Minita	187	CDP	187	Spanish	96.8	3.2
La Moca Ranch	34	CDP	34	Spanish	100	0
La Paloma	2,806	CDP	2,427	Spanish	88.3	11.7
La Paloma Ranchettes	25	CDP	25	Spanish	100	0
La Presa	220	CDP	185	Spanish	100	0
La Pryor	1,090	CDP	1,013	Spanish	71.9	28.1
La Puerta	714	CDP	585	Spanish	100	0
Laredo	255,293	City	233,753	Spanish	87.7	11.5
La Rosita	201	CDP	201	Spanish	100	0
Lasara	1,065	CDP	1,024	Spanish	73.8	26.2
Las Lomas	2,164	CDP	1,994	Spanish	88.3	11.7
Las Lomitas	56	CDP	45	Spanish	86.7	13.3
Las Palmas	46	CDP	46	Spanish	71.7	28.3
Las Palmas II	850	CDP	850	Spanish	62.1	37.9
Las Quintas Fronterizas	1,058	CDP	987	Spanish	96	4
La Tina Ranch	725	CDP	613	Spanish	98.5	1.5
Laureles	3,818	CDP	3,518	Spanish	71.7	28.3
La Victoria	156	CDP	156	Spanish	74.4	25.6
La Villa	2,872	City	2,708	Spanish	90.8	8.8
Lingleville	158	CDP	158	Spanish	53.8	46.2
Linn	759	CDP	744	Spanish	89.9	10.1
Llano Grande	2,065	CDP	1,957	Spanish	71.7	27.3
Loma Grande	210	CDP	186	Spanish	84.9	15.1
Loma Linda	203	CDP	203	Spanish	89.7	10.3
Loma Linda East	34	CDP	34	Spanish	70.6	29.4
Loma Vista	117	CDP	95	Spanish	100	0
Longoria	60	CDP	60	Spanish	100	0
Loop	172	CDP	172	Spanish	51.7	47.7
Lopeño	48	CDP	31	Spanish	100	0
Lopezville	1,845	CDP	1,761	Spanish	94.4	5.6
Los Altos	78	CDP	78	Spanish	100	0
Los Alvarez	181	CDP	181	Spanish	98.3	1.7
Los Angeles	430	CDP	430	Spanish	53.3	46.7
Los Arcos	41	CDP	41	Spanish	100	0
Los Barreras	351	CDP	351	Spanish	67	33
Los Ebanos (Hidalgo County)	44	CDP	44	Spanish	100	0
Los Ebanos (Starr County)	139	CDP	139	Spanish	100	0
Los Fresnos	8,081	City	7,449	Spanish	67.6	32.2
Los Fresnos	197	CDP	162	Spanish	100	0
Los Indios	1,012	Town	886	Spanish	73.1	26.9
Los Veteranos I	39	CDP	27	Spanish	100	0
Los Veteranos II	13	CDP	13	Spanish	100	0
Lozano	185	CDP	185	Spanish	100	0
Lyford	2,540	City	2,374	Spanish	74.7	25.2
McAllen	142,722	City	132,678	Spanish	72.2	25.3
McKinney Acres	868	CDP	839	Spanish	76	24
Manor	15,341	City	13,400	Spanish	50.8	43.2
Manuel Garcia	57	CDP	57	Spanish	100	0
Martinez	12	CDP	12	Spanish	100	0
Mathis	4,350	City	4,040	Spanish	57.4	42.3
Meadow	823	Town	666	Spanish	52	48
Medina	4,436	CDP	4,068	Spanish	90.6	9.4
Melvin	151	Town	151	Spanish	51	49
Mercedes	16,361	City	15,098	Spanish	77.8	21.7
Mesquite	145	CDP	145	Spanish	94.5	5.5
Midway North	4,033	CDP	3,825	Spanish	90.4	9.6
Midway South	2,419	CDP	2,174	Spanish	87.5	11.6
Miguel Barrera	138	CDP	138	Spanish	100	0
Mikes	1,364	CDP	1,328	Spanish	96.5	3.5
Mila Doce	7,554	CDP	6,919	Spanish	94.5	5.5
Miller's Cove	74	Town	74	Spanish	87.8	12.2
Mi Ranchito Estate	1,039	CDP	946	Spanish	92.7	7.3
Mirando City	199	CDP	187	Spanish	50.3	49.7
Mission	85,755	City	79,103	Spanish	79.4	18.8
Mission Bend	37,853	CDP	35,641	English	43.9	43.9
Mobile City	277	City	231	Spanish	91.8	8.2
Monte Alto	1,666	CDP	1,548	Spanish	87.6	12.4
Morgan Farm	434	CDP	346	Spanish	69.4	30.6
Morning Glory	427	CDP	392	Spanish	87.8	12.2
Morse	242	CDP	204	Spanish	55.4	44.6
Morton	1,572	City	1,442	Spanish	55.1	39.9
Muleshoe	5,515	City	4,962	Spanish	63.3	34
Muniz	772	CDP	611	Spanish	88.7	11.3
Murillo	8,744	CDP	7,957	Spanish	85.2	14.8
New Summerfield	668	City	635	Spanish	72.6	26.5
Nina	852	CDP	713	Spanish	97.3	2.7
Nixon	2,898	City	2,420	Spanish	59.5	40.5
Normandy	45	CDP	45	Spanish	100	0
North Alamo	5,130	CDP	4,847	Spanish	79	21
North Escobares	194	CDP	108	Spanish	100	0
North Pearsall	711	CDP	711	Spanish	67.7	32.3
Oilton	130	CDP	130	Spanish	87.7	12.3
Olivarez	6,853	CDP	5,161	Spanish	90.4	9.6
Olivia Lopez de Gutierrez	440	CDP	440	Spanish	100	0
Olmito	794	CDP	775	Spanish	94.5	5.5
Olmito and Olmito	284	CDP	220	Spanish	100	0
Olton	1,749	City	1,618	Spanish	56	44
Orason	597	CDP	597	Spanish	50.8	49.2
Owl Ranch	118	CDP	96	Spanish	65.6	34.4
Ozona	2,306	CDP	2,306	Spanish	66.7	33.3
Pablo Pena	309	CDP	309	Spanish	72.2	27.8
Palacios	4,411	City	4,149	Spanish	50.3	49
Palmer	1,523	CDP	1,425	Spanish	99.4	0.6
Palmhurst	2,597	City	2,427	Spanish	60.1	39.4
Palmview	15,245	City	14,646	Spanish	86.4	13.2
Palmview South	2,141	CDP	2,018	Spanish	93.8	6.2
Palo Blanco	19	CDP	19	Spanish	100	0
Pawnee	97	CDP	88	Spanish	65.9	34.1
Pearsall	8,870	City	8,246	Spanish	52.3	45.1
Pecos	11,919	City	11,148	Spanish	53.7	45.1
Pena	75	CDP	75	Spanish	100	0
Penitas	6,313	City	5,866	Spanish	91.4	8.6
Perezville	2,703	CDP	2,505	Spanish	59.8	35.5
Perryton	8,664	City	8,041	Spanish	54.4	45.1
Petersburg	827	City	775	Spanish	56.6	43.4
Petronila	69	City	68	Spanish	60.3	39.7
Pharr	79,434	City	72,210	Spanish	83.2	16.4
Pleasant Hill	975	CDP	975	Spanish	60.9	39.1
Plum Grove	1,613	City	1,521	Spanish	66.7	32.5
Port Isabel	5,137	City	4,813	Spanish	55.3	44.7
Prado Verde	424	CDP	424	Spanish	70.8	29.2
Premont	2,810	City	2,580	Spanish	69	30.3
Presidio	3,299	City	2,899	Spanish	100	0
Progreso	4,914	City	4,516	Spanish	92.6	7.4
Progreso Lakes	292	City	276	Spanish	70.3	28.3
Pueblo Nuevo	569	CDP	545	Spanish	97.1	2.9
Quemado	91	CDP	91	Spanish	100	0
Quesada	62	CDP	62	Spanish	100	0
Rafael Pena	12	CDP	12	Spanish	100	0
Ramos	31	CDP	29	Spanish	86.2	13.8
Ranchette Estates	173	CDP	173	Spanish	100	0
Ranchitos del Norte	214	CDP	106	Spanish	100	0
Ranchitos East	313	CDP	237	Spanish	100	0
Ranchitos Las Lomas	369	CDP	358	Spanish	96.9	3.1
Rancho Alegre	1,099	CDP	970	Spanish	75.6	24.4
Rancho Banquete	243	CDP	243	Spanish	59.3	40.7
Ranchos Penitas West	571	CDP	496	Spanish	97.8	2.2
Rancho Viejo	2,814	Town	2,724	Spanish	67.8	29.7
Rancho Viejo	148	CDP	148	Spanish	100	0
Rangerville	106	Village	106	Spanish	51.9	48.1
Raymondville	10,301	City	9,581	Spanish	57.6	42.4
Realitos	93	CDP	93	Spanish	86	14
Redwood	3,423	CDP	3,380	Spanish	59.2	40.8
Reid Hope King	926	CDP	835	Spanish	90.8	9.2
Relampago	292	CDP	292	Spanish	62.3	37.7
Rice Tracts	1,185	CDP	1,103	Spanish	52.9	47.1
Rio Bravo	4,437	City	4,088	Spanish	93.8	6.2
Rio Grande City	15,256	City	14,091	Spanish	88.1	11.7
Rio Hondo	2,295	City	2,125	Spanish	59.3	40.4
River Oaks	7,586	City	7,032	Spanish	50.1	48.9
Road Runner	648	Town	637	Spanish	55.6	44
Robstown	10,246	City	9,623	Spanish	61.1	38.9
Rocksprings	1,002	Town	957	Spanish	54.8	45.2
Roma	11,531	City	10,073	Spanish	95.1	4.9
Rosharon	1,689	CDP	1,652	Spanish	79.9	20.1
Rosita	3,717	CDP	3,442	Spanish	69.7	8.5
Salida del Sol Estates	6,172	CDP	5,520	Spanish	98.8	1.2
Salineño	98	CDP	98	Spanish	100	0
Salineño North	77	CDP	56	Spanish	100	0
Sammy Martinez	144	CDP	144	Spanish	60.4	39.6
San Benito	24,766	City	23,115	Spanish	57.4	42.2
San Carlos	4,069	CDP	3,859	Spanish	82.3	17.7
San Carlos I	233	CDP	233	Spanish	100	0
San Carlos II	272	CDP	227	Spanish	93.4	6.6
San Diego	3,801	City	3,507	Spanish	55.3	44.7
San Elizario	10,072	City	9,247	Spanish	93.2	6.5
San Isidro	255	CDP	255	Spanish	83.1	16.9
San Juan	35,463	City	32,113	Spanish	81.6	18.2
San Juan	95	CDP	95	Spanish	100	0
San Pedro	360	CDP	326	Spanish	58.9	41.1
San Perlita	784	City	748	Spanish	64.3	35.7
Sansom Park	5,387	City	4,902	Spanish	52	47.5
Santa Anna	3	CDP	3	Spanish	100	0
Santa Maria	587	CDP	553	Spanish	74.1	25.9
Santa Monica	8	CDP	8	Spanish	62.5	37.5
Santa Rosa	386	CDP	386	Spanish	98.7	1.3
Santel	10	CDP	10	Spanish	100	0
San Ygnacio	590	CDP	563	Spanish	94.3	5.7
Sarita	111	CDP	83	Spanish	88	12
Scissors	3,667	CDP	3,149	Spanish	94.2	5.8
Sebastian	1,276	CDP	1,260	Spanish	81.1	18.9
Seco Mines	1,274	CDP	1,243	Spanish	71.8	28.2
Sheldon	2,410	CDP	2,204	Spanish	71.6	28.4
Sierra Blanca	544	CDP	470	Spanish	52.3	40.4
Siesta Acres	1,636	CDP	1,473	Spanish	98.6	1.4
Siesta Shores	1,619	CDP	1,401	Spanish	78.3	21.7
Socorro	35,429	City	33,272	Spanish	87	12.7
Solis	688	CDP	688	Spanish	71.1	28.9
Sonora	2,852	City	2,675	Spanish	55.7	44.3
South Alamo	3,433	CDP	3,037	Spanish	89.5	10.5
South Fork Estates	55	CDP	55	Spanish	58.2	41.8
South Houston	16,169	City	14,855	Spanish	71.1	28.1
South Point	670	CDP	670	Spanish	89.1	10.9
Sparks	5,212	CDP	4,866	Spanish	93.2	6.8
Spofford	103	City	103	Spanish	63.1	36.9
Spring Gardens	727	CDP	678	Spanish	69.5	30.5
Springlake	91	Town	91	Spanish	54.9	45.1
Stowell	1,960	CDP	1,917	English	49	49
Study Butte	178	CDP	178	Spanish	79.2	20.8
Sullivan City	3,917	City	3,537	Spanish	95.7	4.3
Sunray	2,717	City	2,475	Spanish	54.4	44.9
Sunset (Starr County)	60	CDP	60	Spanish	100	0
Sunset Acres	25	CDP	25	Spanish	60	40
Taft Southwest	1,468	CDP	1,316	Spanish	53.5	46.5
Tanquecitos South Acres	216	CDP	216	Spanish	100	0
The Homesteads	2,988	CDP	2,900	Spanish	60.1	39.9
Tivoli	628	CDP	597	Spanish	65.7	34.3
Tornillo	1,548	CDP	1,542	Spanish	96.7	3.3
Toyah	30	Town	30	Spanish	100	0
Tradewinds	347	CDP	347	Spanish	51.9	48.1
Tynan	289	CDP	276	Spanish	76.1	23.9
Uvalde	15,342	City	14,195	Spanish	50.8	47.6
Uvalde Estates	2,819	CDP	2,679	Spanish	76.9	23.1
Valentine	110	Town	110	Spanish	82.7	17.3
Valera	54	CDP	54	Spanish	53.7	46.3
Valle Vista	816	CDP	745	Spanish	95	5
Val Verde Park	3,319	CDP	2,874	Spanish	78	20.3
Van Horn	2,075	Town	2,042	Spanish	68.1	31.5
Victoria Vera	26	CDP	26	Spanish	100	0
Villa del Sol	208	CDP	208	Spanish	69.2	30.8
Villa Pancho	452	CDP	421	Spanish	100	0
Villa Verde	155	CDP	155	Spanish	85.2	14.8
Vinton	2,692	Village	2,620	Spanish	68.9	28.1
Von Ormy	1,096	City	1,060	Spanish	66.3	33.7
Waelder	1,061	City	1,030	Spanish	68.7	31.3
Welch	294	CDP	181	English	44.8	44.8
Weslaco	40,858	City	37,693	Spanish	73	26.4
West Alto Bonito	505	CDP	405	Spanish	100	0
Western Lake	1,207	CDP	1,158	Spanish	72.5	24.4
Westminster	1,317	CDP	1,145	Spanish	61.8	37.5
West Odessa	30,904	CDP	28,679	Spanish	59.6	40.3
West Sharyland	1,718	CDP	1,676	Spanish	94.6	5.4
Westway	3,480	CDP	3,212	Spanish	90.2	9.8
Winfield	528	City	481	Spanish	64.9	35.1
Wyldwood	4,368	CDP	4,281	Spanish	51.4	48.6
Yancey	287	CDP	287	Spanish	50.2	49.8
Yznaga	44	CDP	44	Spanish	68.2	0
Zapata	5,110	CDP	4,676	Spanish	85.4	14.6
Zapata Ranch	246	CDP	246	Spanish	93.9	6.1

=== Utah ===
Community	Population	Type	Population of over five years	Plurality Language group	Percentage	English Percentage
Aneth	342	CDP	334	Other	64.1	35.9
Bryce Canyon City	229	Town	229	Other Indo-European	45.9	26.2
Garden	123	CDP	123	Spanish	72.4	27.6
Halchita	256	CDP	227	Other	67.8	32.2
Hideout	1,066	Town	933	Spanish	57	42.3
La Sal	270	CDP	270	Spanish	64.4	35.6
Mexican Hat	22	CDP	22	Other	100	0
Montezuma Creek	272	CDP	256	Other	55.1	42.6
Navajo Mountain	663	CDP	652	Other	89	9.7
Oljato-Monument Valley	729	CDP	701	Other	77.3	21.5
Ophir	41	CDP	41	Other	58.5	41.5
Randlett	62	CDP	62	Other	61.3	38.7
Tselakai Dezza	89	CDP	84	Other	73.8	26.2
Wendover	1,163	City	1,066	Spanish	69.1	30.9

=== Vermont ===
Community	Population	Type	Population of over five years	Plurality Language group	Percentage	English Percentage
Highgate Springs	3	CDP	3	Spanish	100	0

=== Virginia ===
Community	Population	Type	Population of over five years	Plurality Language group	Percentage	English Percentage
Annandale	42,330	CDP	39,697	English	42.1	42.1
Arcola	2,437	CDP	2,233	English	38.3	38.3
Bailey's Crossroads	24,785	CDP	22,355	English	38.1	38.1
Boswell's Corner	1,215	CDP	1,130	Spanish	49.9	47
Bull Run (Prince William County)	16,620	CDP	15,094	English	43.4	43.4
Chantilly	23,107	CDP	22,009	English	45.4	45.4
Dulles Town Center	5,884	CDP	5,511	English	49.4	49.4
Goose Creek Village	2,332	CDP	2,190	English	42.4	42.4
Herndon	24,456	Town	22,686	English	46.3	46.3
Hutchison	6,947	CDP	6,048	Spanish	49	32.8
Hybla Valley	18,104	CDP	16,091	English	47	47
Loch Lomond	3,851	CDP	3,735	Spanish	54.7	40.5
Loudoun Valley Estates	10,514	CDP	9,925	English	46.1	46.1
McNair	22,187	CDP	20,494	English	43.1	43.1
Manassas Park	17,123	City	15,946	English	48.1	48.1
Navy	3,638	CDP	3,489	English	47.9	47.9
North Springfield	6,916	CDP	6,302	English	45.6	45.6
Oak Grove	2,533	CDP	2,185	English	44.9	44.9
Pastoria	761	CDP	721	English	41.7	41.7
Seven Corners	9,141	CDP	8,349	English	39.3	39.3
Springfield	31,022	CDP	29,152	English	46.1	46.1
Sterling	31,058	CDP	28,830	Spanish	42.3	40.6
Sudley	19,289	CDP	17,571	Spanish	48.5	34.7
Sugarland Run	12,818	CDP	12,100	English	44.4	44.4
Sully Square	2,560	CDP	2,373	English	41.4	41.4
West Falls Church	31,121	CDP	28,652	English	46.7	46.7
Woodbridge	42,619	CDP	39,790	English	48.2	48.2
Woodlawn (Fairfax County)	22,966	CDP	21,466	English	43.3	43.3
Yorkshire	10,563	CDP	9,650	Spanish	52.5	40.2

=== Washington ===
Community	Population	Type	Population of over five years	Plurality Language group	Percentage	English Percentage
Basin City	1,570	CDP	1,233	Spanish	89.1	10.9
Beverly	308	CDP	276	Spanish	100	0
Brewster	2,241	City	1,932	Spanish	70.5	29.5
Bridgeport	2,416	City	2,116	Spanish	86.2	13.8
Desert Aire	2,714	CDP	2,454	Spanish	57.9	40.7
George	892	City	756	Spanish	73.5	23.7
Grandview	10,922	City	9,739	Spanish	71.1	27.6
Granger	3,632	City	3,385	Spanish	69.9	30.1
Harrah	640	Town	619	Spanish	55.6	42.5
Hatton	492	Town	476	Spanish	88.2	11.8
Mabton	2,314	City	2,116	Spanish	84.6	15.4
Mattawa	3,506	City	3,238	Spanish	96.9	3.1
Mesa	717	City	667	Spanish	70.8	27.7
Othello	8,582	City	7,564	Spanish	55.4	43.2
Outlook	340	CDP	283	Spanish	88	12
Parker	90	CDP	90	Spanish	88.9	11.1
Pasco	77,274	City	70,694	English	48.8	48.8
Pateros	668	City	606	Spanish	52.6	47.4
Quincy	7,754	City	6,980	Spanish	67.7	31.1
Royal City	2,060	City	1,932	Spanish	85.6	14.4
Schwana	351	CDP	320	Spanish	64.7	35.3
South Wenatchee	1,267	CDP	1,104	Spanish	72.5	25.4
Sunnyside	16,329	City	14,851	Spanish	72.4	26.5
Tieton	1,546	City	1,433	Spanish	69.2	30.8
Toppenish	8,820	City	8,000	Spanish	74.5	25.1
Wallula	88	CDP	68	Spanish	55.9	44.1
Wapato	4,600	City	4,187	Spanish	75	20.9
Warden	2,483	City	2,348	Spanish	60.4	39.4

=== West Virginia ===
Community	Population	Type	Population of over five years	Plurality Language group	Percentage	English Percentage
Glen White	194	CDP	194	Spanish	51.5	48.5

=== Wisconsin ===
Community	Population	Type	Population of over five years	Plurality Language group	Percentage	English Percentage
Big Foot Prairie	99	CDP	96	English	41.7	41.7
Curtiss	347	Village	295	Spanish	74.2	23.7
Yuba	44	Village	40	Other Indo-European	55	45

=== Wyoming ===
Community	Population	Type	Population of over five years	Plurality Language group	Percentage	English Percentage
Alpine Northwest	289	CDP	264	Spanish	79.2	20.8
Dixon	310	Town	288	Spanish	56.6	43.4
Washam	47	CDP	47	Other Indo-European	51.1	48.9

== See also ==
- Language education in the United States
- Language Spoken at Home
- List of multilingual presidents of the United States
- Muhlenberg legend
