= Flower Hill =

Flower Hill may refer to:

- Flower Hill, Maryland
- Flower Hill, New York
- Flower Hill, Texas

== See also ==
- Flower Hill Cemetery (disambiguation)
- Flower Hill Mass Grave
- Flowerhill (disambiguation)
