= Flowerhill =

Flowerhill may refer to three townlands in Ireland. See:

- List of townlands of County Galway
- List of townlands of County Sligo
- List of townlands of County Waterford

== See also ==
- Flower Hill (disambiguation)
