= Alto Bonito Heights, Texas =

- Unincorporated community Census-designated place
- Interactive map of Alto Bonito Heights, Texas
- Coordinates: 26°18′57″N 98°38′29″W
- Country: United States
- State: Texas
- County: Starr

Area
  - Total: 0.1 sq mi (0.26 km^{2})
  - Land: 0.1 sq mi (0.26 km^{2})
  - Water: 0.0 sq mi (0 km^{2})

Population (2020)
  - Total: 296
  - Density: 3,000/sq mi (1,100/km^{2})
- Time zone: UTC-6 (Central (CST))
  - Summer (DST): UTC-5 (CDT)
- Zip Code: 78582
- FIPS code: 48-02194

Alto Bonito Heights is an unincorporated community and census-designated place (CDP) in Starr County, Texas, United States. It is a new CDP, formed from part of the old La Victoria CDP prior to the 2010 census. As of the 2020 census, Alto Bonito Heights had a population of 296.

== Geography ==
Alto Bonito Heights is located at 26°18′57″N 98°38′29″W (26.315777, -98.641329).).

== Education ==
The CDP is within the Rio Grande City Grulla Independent School District (formerly Rio Grande City Consolidated Independent School District)

== Demographics ==
Historical population
Census	Pop.	Note	%±
2010	342		—
2020	296		−13.5%
U.S. Decennial Census; 1850–1900 1910; 1920 1930 1940; 1950 1960 1970; 1980 1990 2000; 2010 2020

Alto Bonito Heights along with 5 other census designated places (El Castillo, El Socio, Eugenio Saenz, Olmito and Olmito, and Valle Vista) was formed prior to the 2010 U.S. census from parts of La Victoria CDP.

=== 2020 census ===
Alto Bonito Heights CDP, Texas – Racial and ethnic composition Note: the US Census treats Hispanic/Latino as an ethnic category. This table excludes Latinos from the racial categories and assigns them to a separate category. Hispanics/Latinos may be of any race.
Race / Ethnicity (NH = Non-Hispanic)	Pop 2010	Pop 2020	% 2010	% 2020
White alone (NH)	0	1	0.00%	0.34%
Black or African American alone (NH)	0	0	0.00%	0.00%
Native American or Alaska Native alone (NH)	0	0	0.00%	0.00%
Asian alone (NH)	0	0	0.00%	0.00%
Pacific Islander alone (NH)	0	0	0.00%	0.00%
Some Other Race alone (NH)	0	0	0.00%	0.00%
Mixed Race or Multi-Racial (NH)	0	0	0.00%	0.00%
Hispanic or Latino (any race)	342	295	100.00%	99.66%
Total	342	296	100.00%	100.00%
