= Eugenio Saenz, Texas =

- Unincorporated community Census-designated place
- Interactive map of Eugenio Saenz, Texas
- Coordinates: 26°21′30″N 98°37′59″W
- Country: United States
- State: Texas
- County: Starr

Population (2020)
  - Total: 182
- Time zone: UTC-6 (Central (CST))
  - Summer (DST): UTC-5 (CDT)
- Zip Code: 78582

Eugenio Saenz is a census-designated place (CDP) in Starr County, Texas, United States. As of the 2020 census, Eugenio Saenz had a population of 182. It is a new CDP, formed from part of the old La Victoria CDP prior to the 2010 census.

== Geography ==
Eugenio Saenz is located at 26°21′30″N 98°37′59″W (26.358253, -98.633123).

== Demographics ==
Historical population
Census	Pop.	Note	%±
2010	159		—
2020	182		14.5%
U.S. Decennial Census; 1850–1900 1910; 1920 1930 1940; 1950 1960 1970; 1980 1990 2000; 2010 2020

Eugenio Saenz along with 5 other census designated places (Alto Bonito Heights, El Castillo, El Socio, Olmito and Olmito, and Valle Vista) was formed prior to the 2010 U.S. census from parts of La Victoria CDP.

=== 2020 census ===
Eugenio Saenz CDP, Texas – Racial and ethnic composition Note: the US Census treats Hispanic/Latino as an ethnic category. This table excludes Latinos from the racial categories and assigns them to a separate category. Hispanics/Latinos may be of any race.
Race / Ethnicity (NH = Non-Hispanic)	Pop 2010	Pop 2020	% 2010	% 2020
White alone (NH)	0	2	0.00%	1.10%
Black or African American alone (NH)	0	0	0.00%	0.00%
Native American or Alaska Native alone (NH)	0	0	0.00%	0.00%
Asian alone (NH)	0	0	0.00%	0.00%
Pacific Islander alone (NH)	0	0	0.00%	0.00%
Some Other Race alone (NH)	0	1	0.00%	0.55%
Mixed Race or Multi-Racial (NH)	0	2	0.00%	1.10%
Hispanic or Latino (any race)	159	177	100.00%	97.25%
Total	159	182	100.00%	100.00%

== Education ==
The CDP is within the Rio Grande City Grulla Independent School District (formerly Rio Grande City Consolidated Independent School District).
