= Rice Tracts, Texas =

- Census-designated place
- Location within Texas Location within the United States
- Coordinates: 26°3′30″N 97°37′37″W
- Country: United States
- State: Texas
- County: Cameron

Area
  - Total: 2.03 sq mi (5.25 km^{2})
  - Land: 1.87 sq mi (4.85 km^{2})
  - Water: 0.15 sq mi (0.40 km^{2})
- Elevation: 46 ft (14 m)
- Time zone: UTC-6 (Central (CST))
  - Summer (DST): UTC-5 (CDT)
- ZIP Code: 78586 (San Benito)
- Area code: 956
- FIPS code: 48-61766
- GNIS feature ID: 2805754

Rice Tracts is an unincorporated community and census-designated place (CDP) in Cameron County, Texas, United States. It was first listed as a CDP prior to the 2020 census. As of the 2020 census, Rice Tracts had a population of 733.

It is in the southern part of the county, bordered to the north and northeast by Brownsville, to the southeast, south, and southwest by Encantada-Ranchito-El Calaboz, and to the northwest by Palmer. It is 6 miles (10 km) south of San Benito and 15 miles (24 km) northwest of downtown Brownsville.

The Resaca del Rancho Viejo, a southeastward-flowing tributary of the Rio Grande, winds through the northern half of the community.

== Demographics ==
Historical population
Census	Pop.	Note	%±
2020	733		—
U.S. Decennial Census; 1850–1900 1910; 1920 1930 1940; 1950 1960 1970; 1980 1990 2000; 2010 2020

Rice Tracts first appeared as a census designated place in the 2020 U.S. census.

=== 2020 census ===
Rice Tracts CDP, Texas – Racial and ethnic composition Note: the US Census treats Hispanic/Latino as an ethnic category. This table excludes Latinos from the racial categories and assigns them to a separate category. Hispanics/Latinos may be of any race.
Race / Ethnicity (NH = Non-Hispanic)	Pop 2020	% 2020
White alone (NH)	94	12.82%
Black or African American alone (NH)	1	0.14%
Native American or Alaska Native alone (NH)	0	0.00%
Asian alone (NH)	0	0.00%
Native Hawaiian or Pacific Islander alone (NH)	0	0.00%
Other race alone (NH)	4	0.55%
Mixed race or Multiracial (NH)	6	0.82%
Hispanic or Latino (any race)	628	85.68%
Total	733	100.00%
