= Shipshewana Lake, Indiana =

- Census-designated place
- Location within Indiana Location within the United States
- Coordinates: 41°41′06″N 85°36′23″W
- Country: United States
- State: Indiana
- County: LaGrange
- Township: Newbury

Area
  - Total: 0.64 sq mi (1.7 km^{2})
  - Land: 0.33 sq mi (0.85 km^{2})
  - Water: 0.31 sq mi (0.80 km^{2})
- Elevation: 853 ft (260 m)
- Time zone: UTC-5 (Eastern (EST))
  - Summer (DST): UTC-4 (EDT)
- ZIP code: 46565 (Shipshewana)
- Area code: 260
- FIPS code: 18-69489
- GNIS feature ID: 2830439

Shipshewana Lake is an unincorporated community and census-designated place (CDP) in LaGrange County, Indiana, United States.

== Geography ==
The community is in western LaGrange County, surrounding the natural water body of Shipshewana Lake. It is 1 mile (1.6 km) northwest of the town of Shipshewana and 6 miles (10 km) east of Middlebury.

According to the U.S. Census Bureau, the Shipshewana Lake CDP has a total area of 0.64 square miles (1.66 km^{2}), of which 0.33 square miles (0.85 km^{2}) are land and 0.31 square miles (0.80 km^{2}), or 48.12%, are water. The lake drains at its southeast end into Page Ditch, which flows northeast to the Pigeon River, a west-flowing tributary of the St. Joseph River, leading to Lake Michigan.

== Demographics ==
Historical population
Census	Pop.	Note	%±
2023 (est.)	325

The United States Census Bureau defined Shipshewana Lake as a census designated place in the 2022 American Community Survey.
