= El Castillo, Texas =

- Unincorporated community Census-designated place
- Location of El Castillo, Texas
- Coordinates: 26°20′6″N 98°38′19″W
- Country: United States
- State: Texas

Area
  - Total: 0.027 sq mi (0.07 km^{2})
  - Land: 0.027 sq mi (0.07 km^{2})
  - Water: 0 sq mi (0.0 km^{2})
- Elevation: 0.23 ft (0.07 m)

Population (2010)
  - Total: 188
  - Density: 7,000/sq mi (2,700/km^{2})
- Time zone: UTC-6 (Central (CST): UTC-6)
  - Summer (DST): UTC-5 (CDT)
- ZIP code: 78582
- GNIS feature ID: 2584627

El Castillo (in Spanish: Castle) is a census-designated place located in Starr County, Texas, United States. It is a new CDP, formed from part of the old La Victoria CDP for the 2010 census. As of the 2020 census, El Castillo had a population of 219.

== Geography ==
El Castillo is located at 26°20′6″N 98°38′19″W (26.334926, -98.638659). According to the United States Census Bureau, El Castillo has a total area of 0.07 km^{2}, all land.

== Demographics ==
Historical population
Census	Pop.	Note	%±
2010	188		—
2020	219		16.5%
U.S. Decennial Census; 1850–1900 1910; 1920 1930 1940; 1950 1960 1970; 1980 1990 2000; 2010

El Castillo along with 5 other census designated places (Alto Bonito Heights, El Socio, Eugenio Saenz, Olmito and Olmito, and Valle Vista) was formed prior to the 2010 U.S. census from parts of La Victoria CDP.

=== 2020 census ===
El Castillo CDP, Texas – Racial and ethnic composition Note: the US Census treats Hispanic/Latino as an ethnic category. This table excludes Latinos from the racial categories and assigns them to a separate category. Hispanics/Latinos may be of any race.
Race / Ethnicity (NH = Non-Hispanic)	Pop 2010	Pop 2020	% 2010	% 2020
White alone (NH)	0	1	0.00%	0.46%
Black or African American alone (NH)	0	0	0.00%	0.00%
Native American or Alaska Native alone (NH)	0	0	0.00%	0.00%
Asian alone (NH)	0	0	0.00%	0.00%
Pacific Islander alone (NH)	0	0	0.00%	0.00%
Some Other Race alone (NH)	0	0	0.00%	0.00%
Mixed Race or Multi-Racial (NH)	0	0	0.00%	0.00%
Hispanic or Latino (any race)	188	218	100.00%	99.54%
Total	188	219	100.00%	100.00%

=== 2010 census ===
According to the 2010 US Census, there were 188 people residing in El Castillo. The density was 2,686 inhabitants/km^{2}. Populated for 188 inhabitants, El Castillo was composed of the 76.06% white, the 22.87% of other races and the 1.06% belonged to two or more races. Of the total population, 100% were Hispanic and Latino of any race.

== Education ==
The CDP is within the Rio Grande City Grulla Independent School District (formerly Rio Grande City Consolidated Independent School District)
