= Flower Hill Cemetery =

Flower Hill Cemetery may refer to:

- Flower Hill Cemetery (Flower Hill, New York)
- Flower Hill Cemetery (North Bergen, New Jersey)
- Flower Hill Cemetery, Fulton, Arkansas
- Flower Hill Cemetery, Bennington, Nebraska
- Flower Hill Cemetery, Grand Cane, Louisiana
- Flower Hill Cemetery, at the Amelia Court House, Virginia
