= Olmito and Olmito, Texas =

- Unincorporated community Census-designated place
- Interactive map of Olmito and Olmito, Texas
- Coordinates: 26°20′24″N 98°38′31″W
- Country: United States
- State: Texas
- County: Starr

Population (2020)
  - Total: 276
- Time zone: UTC-6 (Central (CST))
  - Summer (DST): UTC-5 (CDT)
- Zip Code: 78582

Olmito and Olmito is a census-designated place (CDP) in Starr County, Texas, United States. It is a new CDP, formed from part of the old La Victoria CDP prior to the 2010 census. As of the 2020 census, Olmito and Olmito had a population of 276.

== Geography ==
Olmito and Olmito is located at 26°20′24″N 98°38′31″W (26.340011, -98.641971).

== Demographics ==
Historical population
Census	Pop.	Note	%±
2010	271		—
2020	276		1.8%
U.S. Decennial Census; 1850–1900 1910; 1920 1930 1940; 1950 1960 1970; 1980 1990 2000; 2010 2020

Olmito and Olmito along with 5 other census designated places (Alto Bonito Heights, El Castillo, El Socio, Eugenio Saenz, and Valle Vista) was formed prior to the 2010 U.S. census from parts of La Victoria CDP.

=== 2020 census ===
Olmito and Olmito CDP, Texas – Racial and ethnic composition Note: the US Census treats Hispanic/Latino as an ethnic category. This table excludes Latinos from the racial categories and assigns them to a separate category. Hispanics/Latinos may be of any race.
Race / Ethnicity (NH = Non-Hispanic)	Pop 2010	Pop 2020	% 2010	% 2020
White alone (NH)	0	5	0.00%	1.81%
Black or African American alone (NH)	0	0	0.00%	0.00%
Native American or Alaska Native alone (NH)	0	0	0.00%	0.00%
Asian alone (NH)	0	0	0.00%	0.00%
Pacific Islander alone (NH)	0	0	0.00%	0.00%
Some Other Race alone (NH)	0	0	0.00%	0.00%
Mixed Race or Multi-Racial (NH)	0	0	0.00%	0.00%
Hispanic or Latino (any race)	271	271	100.00%	98.19%
Total	271	276	100.00%	100.00%

== Education ==
The CDP is within the Rio Grande City Grulla Independent School District (formerly Rio Grande City Consolidated Independent School District)
