= Valle Vista, Texas =

- Unincorporated community Census-designated place
- Interactive map of Valle Vista, Texas
- Coordinates: 26°18′58″N 98°39′17″W
- Country: United States
- State: Texas
- County: Starr

Area
  - Total: 0.1 sq mi (0.26 km^{2})
  - Land: 0.1 sq mi (0.26 km^{2})
  - Water: 0.0 sq mi (0 km^{2})

Population (2020)
  - Total: 545
  - Density: 5,500/sq mi (2,100/km^{2})
- Time zone: UTC-6 (Central (CST))
  - Summer (DST): UTC-5 (CDT)
- Zip Code: 78582

Valle Vista is a census-designated place (CDP) in Starr County, Texas, United States. It is a new CDP formed from part of the old La Victoria CDP prior to the 2010 census. As of the 2020 census, Valle Vista had a population of 545.

== Geography ==
Valle Vista is located at 26°18′58″N 98°39′17″W (26.316046, -98.654655).

== Demographics ==
Historical population
Census	Pop.	Note	%±
2010	469		—
2020	545		16.2%
U.S. Decennial Census; 1850–1900 1910; 1920 1930 1940; 1950 1960 1970; 1980 1990 2000; 2010 2020

Valle Vista along with 5 other census designated places (Alto Bonito Heights, El Castillo, El Socio, Eugenio Saenz, and Olmito and Olmito) was formed prior to the 2010 U.S. census from parts of La Victoria CDP.

=== 2020 census ===
Valle Vista CDP, Texas – Racial and ethnic composition Note: the US Census treats Hispanic/Latino as an ethnic category. This table excludes Latinos from the racial categories and assigns them to a separate category. Hispanics/Latinos may be of any race.
Race / Ethnicity (NH = Non-Hispanic)	Pop 2010	Pop 2020	% 2010	% 2020
White alone (NH)	0	0	0.00%	0.00%
Black or African American alone (NH)	0	0	0.00%	0.00%
Native American or Alaska Native alone (NH)	0	0	0.00%	0.00%
Asian alone (NH)	0	0	0.00%	0.00%
Pacific Islander alone (NH)	0	0	0.00%	0.00%
Some Other Race alone (NH)	0	0	0.00%	0.00%
Mixed Race or Multi-Racial (NH)	0	1	0.00%	0.18%
Hispanic or Latino (any race)	469	544	100.00%	99.82%
Total	469	545	100.00%	100.00%

== Education ==
The CDP is within the Rio Grande City Grulla Independent School District (formerly Rio Grande City Consolidated Independent School District)
