= Cottonwood, Kern County, California =

Census-designated place near Bakersfield, US

Cottonwood, California
- Unincorporated community Census-designated place
- Location in California Cottonwood, California (the United States)
- Coordinates: 35°20′44.12″N 118°59′9.08″W
- Country: United States
- State: California
- County: Kern

Area
  - Total: 0.463 sq mi (1.20 km^{2})
  - Land: 0.463 sq mi (1.20 km^{2})
  - Water: 0 sq mi (0 km^{2})
- Elevation: 387 ft (118 m)

Population (2020)
  - Total: 3,971
  - Density: 8,580/sq mi (3,310/km^{2})
- Time zone: UTC-8 (Pacific)
  - Summer (DST): UTC-7 (PDT)
- GNIS feature ID: 2804112

Cottonwood is an unincorporated community and census-designated place (CDP) in Kern County, California, United States. The CDP is within the Bakersfield's census county division, and borders the city of Bakersfield on every side except the west, where it abuts Casa Loma.

== Details ==
As listed in the Geographic Names Information System, its elevation is 387 feet.

Its population was 3,971 at the 2020 census, the first census it was included in.

== Demographics ==
Historical population
Census	Pop.	Note	%±
2020	3,971		—
U.S. Decennial Census; 1860–1870 1880-1890; 1900 1910 1920; 1930 1940 1950; 1960 1970 1980; 1990 2000 2010; 2020

Cottonwood first appeared as a census designated place in the 2020 U.S. census.

=== 2020 Census ===
Cottonwood CDP, California – Racial and ethnic composition Note: the US Census treats Hispanic/Latino as an ethnic category. This table excludes Latinos from the racial categories and assigns them to a separate category. Hispanics/Latinos may be of any race.
Race / Ethnicity (NH = Non-Hispanic)	Pop 2020	% 2020
White alone (NH)	172	4.33%
Black or African American alone (NH)	579	14.58%
Native American or Alaska Native alone (NH)	11	0.28%
Asian alone (NH)	12	0.30%
Native Hawaiian or Pacific Islander alone (NH)	0	0.00%
Other race alone (NH)	7	0.18%
Mixed race or Multiracial (NH)	76	1.91%
Hispanic or Latino (any race)	3,114	78.42%
Total	3,971	100.00%
