= Casa Loma, Kern County, California =

Casa Loma, California
- Unincorporated community Census designated place
- Location within California
- Coordinates: 35°20′35.63″N 118°59′55.36″W
- Country: United States
- State: California
- County: Kern
- County Subdivision: Bakersfield CCD

Area
  - Total: 0.389 sq mi (1.01 km^{2})
  - Land: 0.389 sq mi (1.01 km^{2})
  - Water: 0 sq mi (0 km^{2})
- Elevation: 404 ft (123 m)

Population (2020)
  - Total: 1,804
  - Density: 4,640/sq mi (1,790/km^{2})
- Time zone: UTC-8 (PST)
  - Summer (DST): UTC-7 (PDT)
- GNIS feature ID: 2805239

Casa Loma is an unincorporated community and census-designated place (CDP) in Kern County, California, United States. Although it is designated by the census as its own place, it is functionally a neighborhood of Bakersfield.

== Geography ==
Casa Loma sits at an elevation of 404 feet (123 m). Casa Loma is surrounded on three sides by the city of Bakersfield, but borders Cottonwood to the east.

== Demographics ==
Historical population
Census	Pop.	Note	%±
2020	1,804		—
U.S. Decennial Census; 1860–1870 1880-1890; 1900 1910 1920; 1930 1940 1950; 1960 1970 1980; 1990 2000 2010; 2020

Casa Loma was first listed as a census designated place in the 2020 U.S. census with a population of 1,804 people in 546 households.

=== 2020 Census ===
Casa Loma CDP, California – Racial and ethnic composition Note: the US Census treats Hispanic/Latino as an ethnic category. This table excludes Latinos from the racial categories and assigns them to a separate category. Hispanics/Latinos may be of any race.
Race / Ethnicity (NH = Non-Hispanic)	Pop 2020	% 2020
White alone (NH)	246	13.64%
Black or African American alone (NH)	63	3.49%
Native American or Alaska Native alone (NH)	11	0.61%
Asian alone (NH)	6	0.33%
Native Hawaiian or Pacific Islander alone (NH)	0	0.00%
Other race alone (NH)	2	0.11%
Mixed race or Multiracial (NH)	33	1.83%
Hispanic or Latino (any race)	1,443	79.99%
Total	1,804	100.00%
