= El Socio, Texas =

- Unincorporated community Census-designated place
- Interactive map of El Socio, Texas
- Coordinates: 26°20′26″N 98°38′14″W
- Country: United States
- State: Texas
- County: Starr

Population (2020)
  - Total: 104
- Time zone: UTC-6 (Central (CST))
  - Summer (DST): UTC-5 (CDT)
- Zip Code: 78582

El Socio is a census-designated place (CDP) in Starr County, Texas, United States. It is a newly-established CDP, formed from part of the former La Victoria CDP prior to the 2010 census. As of the 2020 census, El Socio had a population of 104.

== Geography ==
El Socio is located at 26°20′26″N 98°38′14″W (26.340454, -98.637097).

== Demographics ==
Historical population
Census	Pop.	Note	%±
2010	130		—
2020	104		−20.0%
U.S. Decennial Census; 1850–1900 1910; 1920 1930 1940; 1950 1960 1970; 1980 1990 2000; 2010 2020

El Socio along with 5 other census designated places (Alto Bonito Heights, El Castillo, Eugenio Saenz, Olmito and Olmito, and Valle Vista) was formed prior to the 2010 U.S. census from parts of La Victoria CDP.

=== 2020 census ===
El Socio CDP, Texas – Racial and ethnic composition Note: the US Census treats Hispanic/Latino as an ethnic category. This table excludes Latinos from the racial categories and assigns them to a separate category. Hispanics/Latinos may be of any race.
Race / Ethnicity (NH = Non-Hispanic)	Pop 2010	Pop 2020	% 2010	% 2020
White alone (NH)	0	0	0.00%	0.00%
Black or African American alone (NH)	0	0	0.00%	0.00%
Native American or Alaska Native alone (NH)	0	0	0.00%	0.00%
Asian alone (NH)	0	0	0.00%	0.00%
Native Hawaiian or Pacific Islander alone (NH)	0	0	0.00%	0.00%
Other race alone (NH)	0	0	0.00%	0.00%
Mixed race or Multiracial (NH)	0	1	0.00%	0.96%
Hispanic or Latino (any race)	130	103	100.00%	99.04%
Total	130	104	100.00%	100.00%

== Education ==
The CDP is within the Rio Grande City Grulla Independent School District (formerly Rio Grande City Consolidated Independent School District)
