= La Victoria, Texas =

- CDP
- Coordinates: 26°20′52.0″N 98°37′46.2″W
- Country: United States
- State: Texas
- County: Starr

Area
  - Total: 0.3 sq mi (0.78 km^{2})
  - Land: 0.3 sq mi (0.78 km^{2})
  - Water: 0.0 sq mi (0 km^{2})
- Elevation: 253 ft (77 m)

Population (2020)
  - Total: 176
  - Density: 590/sq mi (230/km^{2})
- Time zone: UTC-6 (Central (CST))
  - Summer (DST): UTC-5 (CDT)
- Zip Code: 78582
- FIPS code: 48-41782
- GNIS feature ID: 1852729

La Victoria is a census-designated place (CDP) in Starr County, Texas, United States. As of the 2020 census, La Victoria had a population of 176. La Victoria underwent some changes prior to the 2010 census. It gained area, had portions taken to form new CDPs, and lost additional area. Only a small part of 2010 La Victoria CDP was within the 2000 La Victoria CDP.

== Geography ==
La Victoria is located at 26°20′52.0″N 98°37′46.2″W (26.347791, -98.629488)

According to the United States Census Bureau, the CDP has a total area of 0.3 square miles (0.8 km^{2}), all land.

== Demographics ==
Historical population
Census	Pop.	Note	%±
2000	1,683		—
2010	171		−89.8%
2020	176		2.9%
U.S. Decennial Census; 1850–1900 1910; 1920 1930 1940; 1950 1960 1970; 1980 1990 2000; 2010 2020

La Victoria first appeared as a census designated place in the 2000 U.S. census. Prior to the 2020 U.S. census, six census designated places (Alto Bonito Heights, El Castillo, El Socio, Eugenio Saenz, Olmito and Olmito, and Valle Vista) were carved out of its existing territory.

=== 2020 census ===
La Victoria CDP, Texas – Racial and ethnic composition Note: the US Census treats Hispanic/Latino as an ethnic category. This table excludes Latinos from the racial categories and assigns them to a separate category. Hispanics/Latinos may be of any race.
Race / Ethnicity (NH = Non-Hispanic)	Pop 2000	Pop 2010	Pop 2020	% 2000	% 2010	% 2020
White alone (NH)	15	5	4	0.89%	0.00%	2.27%
Black or African American alone (NH)	0	0	0	0.00%	0.00%	0.00%
Native American or Alaska Native alone (NH)	0	0	0	0.00%	0.00%	0.00%
Asian alone (NH)	0	0	0	0.00%	0.00%	0.00%
Pacific Islander alone (NH)	0	0	0	0.00%	0.00%	0.00%
Some Other Race alone (NH)	0	0	0	0.00%	0.00%	0.00%
Mixed race or Multiracial (NH)	0	0	0	0.00%	0.00%	0.00%
Hispanic or Latino (any race)	1,668	166	172	99.11%	97.08%	97.73%
Total	1,683	171	176	100.00%	100.00%	100.00%

=== 2000 census ===
As of the census of 2000, there were 1,683 people, 423 households, and 401 families residing in the CDP. The population density was 462.2 inhabitants per square mile (178.5/km^{2}). There were 548 housing units at an average density of 150.5 per square mile (58.1/km^{2}). The racial makeup of the CDP was 96.20% White, 0.53% African American, 0.06% Native American, 0.06% Asian, 2.85% from other races, and 0.30% from two or more races. Hispanic or Latino of any race were 99.11% of the population.

There were 423 households, out of which 63.4% had children under the age of 18 living with them, 82.3% were married couples living together, 9.5% had a female householder with no husband present, and 5.0% were non-families. 4.3% of all households were made up of individuals, and 1.2% had someone living alone who was 65 years of age or older. The average household size was 3.98 and the average family size was 4.10.

In the CDP, the population was spread out, with 39.2% under the age of 18, 10.8% from 18 to 24, 29.8% from 25 to 44, 15.4% from 45 to 64, and 4.8% who were 65 years of age or older. The median age was 25 years. For every 100 females, there were 98.5 males. For every 100 females age 18 and over, there were 97.9 males.

The median income for a household in the CDP was $21,723, and the median income for a family was $22,708. Males had a median income of $16,667 versus $15,500 for females. The per capita income for the CDP was $5,733. About 39.6% of families and 41.5% of the population were below the poverty line, including 50.1% of those under age 18 and 50.0% of those age 65 or over.

== Education ==
La Victoria is served by the Rio Grande City Grulla Independent School District (formerly Rio Grande City Consolidated Independent School District)
