= Flower Hill, Maryland =

- Census-designated place
- Location within Maryland Location within the United States
- Country: United States of America
- State: Maryland
- County: Montgomery

Area
  - Total: 2.10 sq mi (5.43 km^{2})
  - Land: 2.09 sq mi (5.41 km^{2})
  - Water: 0.0039 sq mi (0.01 km^{2})
- Elevation: 466 ft (142 m)

Population (2020)
  - Total: 14,108
  - Density: 6,748.9/sq mi (2,605.76/km^{2})
- Time zone: UTC-5 (Eastern (EST))
  - Summer (DST): UTC-4 (EDT)
- ZIP code: 20879 (Gaithersburg)
- FIPS code: 24-28512
- GNIS feature ID: 2806303

Flower Hill is a census-designated place in Montgomery County, Maryland, United States. It has a population of 14,108 as of its first recording in the 2020 census.

== Demographics ==
Historical population
Census	Pop.	Note	%±
2020	14,108		—
U.S. Decennial Census; 2020

Flower Hill first appeared as a census designated place in the 2020 U.S. census.

=== 2020 census ===
As of the 2020 census, Flower Hill had a population of 14,108. The median age was 37.2 years. 24.0% of residents were under the age of 18 and 12.8% of residents were 65 years of age or older. For every 100 females there were 96.6 males, and for every 100 females age 18 and over there were 92.9 males age 18 and over.

100.0% of residents lived in urban areas, while 0.0% lived in rural areas.

There were 4,325 households in Flower Hill, of which 39.8% had children under the age of 18 living in them. Of all households, 56.3% were married-couple households, 13.2% were households with a male householder and no spouse or partner present, and 25.6% were households with a female householder and no spouse or partner present. About 16.0% of all households were made up of individuals and 5.6% had someone living alone who was 65 years of age or older.

There were 4,448 housing units, of which 2.8% were vacant. The homeowner vacancy rate was 0.8% and the rental vacancy rate was 3.1%.

Flower Hill CDP, Maryland – Racial and ethnic composition Note: the US Census treats Hispanic/Latino as an ethnic category. This table excludes Latinos from the racial categories and assigns them to a separate category. Hispanics/Latinos may be of any race.
Race / Ethnicity (NH = Non-Hispanic)	Pop 2020	% 2020
White alone (NH)	3,366	23.86%
Black or African American alone (NH)	2,731	19.36%
Native American or Alaska Native alone (NH)	19	0.13%
Asian alone (NH)	2,075	14.71%
Native Hawaiian or Pacific Islander alone (NH)	1	0.01%
Other race alone (NH)	147	1.04%
Mixed race or Multiracial (NH)	560	3.97%
Hispanic or Latino (any race)	5,209	36.92%
Total	14,108	100.00%
