= Montana's 1st congressional district =

U.S. House district for Montana

- Montana's 1st congressional district came into existence in January 2023 and comprises the western portion of the state. Points indicate major cities in the district, sorted by population: 1. Missoula 2. Bozeman 3. Butte 4. Kalispell
- Representative: Ryan Zinke; R–Whitefish
- Population (2025): 584,995
- Median household income: $79,982
- Ethnicity: 84.8% White; 5.0% Two or more races; 4.4% Native American; 4.1% Hispanic; 0.8% Asian; 0.5% other; 0.4% Black
- Cook PVI: R+5

Montana's 1st congressional district is a congressional district in the United States House of Representatives that was apportioned after the 2020 United States census. The first candidates ran in the 2022 elections for a seat in the 118th United States Congress.

This seat's representative is Republican Ryan Zinke, who did not run for reelection, and will be succeeded by Sam Forstag.

== History ==
From 1913 on forward, Montana has had two congressional seats. From 1913 to 1919, those seats were elected statewide at-large on a general ticket. After 1919, however, the state was divided into geographical districts, with the 1st district covering the western part of the state, including Missoula, Great Falls, Butte, and Helena. After 1993, the 2nd district was eliminated and the remaining seat was elected at-large.

Following the release of the 2020 United States census results, Montana was once again split into two congressional districts. The reconstituted 1st district covers the western third of the state, in a configuration similar to the 1983–1993 map. However, Helena was drawn into the reconstituted 2nd district.

The reconstituted 1st leans Republican, though not as overwhelmingly as the 2nd. Missoula, home of the University of Montana, and Butte are longstanding Democratic bastions, while Bozeman, home to Montana State University, is more of a swing area. The rural areas, especially the Flathead, are heavily Republican.

== Recent election results from statewide races ==
| Year | Office | Results |
|---|---|---|
| 2008 | President | Obama 49% - 47% |
| 2012 | Senate | Tester 50% - 43% |
| 2016 | President | Trump 52% - 40% |
| 2016 | Governor | Bullock 53% - 44% |
| 2016 | Secretary of State | Stapleton 53% - 43% |
| 2016 | Attorney General | Fox 62% - 38% |
| 2016 | Auditor | Rosendale 50.1% - 49.9% |
| 2018 | Senate | Tester 54% - 43% |
| 2020 | President | Trump 52% - 45% |
| 2020 | Senate | Daines 51% - 49% |
| 2020 | Governor | Gianforte 50% - 46% |
| 2020 | Secretary of State | Jacobsen 55% - 45% |
| 2020 | Attorney General | Knudsen 54% - 46% |
| 2020 | Auditor | Downing 50% - 44% |
| 2024 | President | Trump 54% - 43% |
| 2024 | Senate | Tester 50% - 49% |
| 2024 | Governor | Gianforte 54% - 43% |
| 2024 | Secretary of State | Jacobsen 57% - 40% |
| 2024 | Attorney General | Knudsen 56% - 44% |
| 2024 | Auditor | Brown 57% - 43% |

== Composition ==
The first district includes all of the following counties, with the exception of Pondera, which it shares with the 2nd. Pondera County communities in the 1st district include Birch Creek Colony, Dupuyer, Heart Butte, Kingsbury Colony, New Miami Colony, Pondera Colony, and Valier.

| # | County | Seat | Population |
|---|---|---|---|
| 1 | Beaverhead | Dillon | 9,885 |
| 23 | Deer Lodge | Anaconda | 9,673 |
| 29 | Flathead | Kalispell | 113,679 |
| 31 | Gallatin | Bozeman | 126,409 |
| 35 | Glacier | Cut Bank | 13,609 |
| 39 | Granite | Philipsburg | 3,595 |
| 47 | Lake | Polson | 33,338 |
| 53 | Lincoln | Libby | 21,895 |
| 57 | Madison | Virginia City | 9,521 |
| 61 | Mineral | Superior | 5,090 |
| 63 | Missoula | Missoula | 121,849 |
| 73 | Pondera | Conrad | 6,125 |
| 77 | Powell | Deer Lodge | 7,133 |
| 81 | Ravalli | Hamilton | 47,738 |
| 89 | Sanders | Thompson Falls | 13,684 |
| 93 | Silver Bow | Butte | 36,360 |

== List of members representing the district ==
| Member | Party | Years | Cong ress | Electoral history |
|---|---|---|---|---|
District established March 4, 1919
| John M. Evans (Missoula) | Democratic | March 4, 1919 – March 3, 1921 | | Redistricted from the at-large district and re-elected in 1918. Lost re-election. |
| Washington J. McCormick (Missoula) | Republican | March 4, 1921 – March 3, 1923 | | Elected in 1920. Lost re-election. |
| John M. Evans (Missoula) | Democratic | March 4, 1923 – March 3, 1933 | 68th 69th 70th 71st 72nd | Re-elected in 1922. Re-elected in 1924. Re-elected in 1926. Re-elected in 1928. Re-elected in 1930. Lost renomination. |
| Joseph P. Monaghan (Butte) | Democratic | March 4, 1933 – January 3, 1937 | 73rd 74th | Elected in 1932. Re-elected in 1934. Retired to run for U.S. senator. |
| Jerry J. O'Connell (Butte) | Democratic | January 3, 1937 – January 3, 1939 | | Elected in 1936. Lost re-election. |
| Jacob Thorkelson (Butte) | Republican | January 3, 1939 – January 3, 1941 | | Elected in 1938. Lost renomination. |
| Jeannette Rankin (Missoula) | Republican | January 3, 1941 – January 3, 1943 | | Elected in 1940. Retired. |
| Mike Mansfield (Missoula) | Democratic | January 3, 1943 – January 3, 1953 | 78th 79th 80th 81st 82nd | Elected in 1942. Re-elected in 1944. Re-elected in 1946. Re-elected in 1948. Re-elected in 1950. Retired to run for U.S. senator. |
| Lee Metcalf (Helena) | Democratic | January 3, 1953 – January 3, 1961 | 83rd 84th 85th 86th | Elected in 1952. Re-elected in 1954. Re-elected in 1956. Re-elected in 1958. Retired to run for U.S. senator. |
| Arnold Olsen (Helena) | Democratic | January 3, 1961 – January 3, 1971 | 87th 88th 89th 90th 91st | Elected in 1960. Re-elected in 1962. Re-elected in 1964. Re-elected in 1966. Re-elected in 1968. Lost re-election. |
| Richard G. Shoup (Missoula) | Republican | January 3, 1971 – January 3, 1975 | 92nd 93rd | Elected in 1970. Re-elected in 1972. Lost re-election. |
| Max Baucus (Missoula) | Democratic | January 3, 1975 – December 14, 1978 | 94th 95th | Elected in 1974. Re-elected in 1976. Retired to run for U.S. senator and resigned when appointed. |
| Vacant | | December 14, 1978 – January 3, 1979 | | |
| Pat Williams (Helena) | Democratic | January 3, 1979 – January 3, 1993 | 96th 97th 98th 99th 100th 101st 102nd | Elected in 1978. Re-elected in 1980. Re-elected in 1982. Re-elected in 1984. Re-elected in 1986. Re-elected in 1988. Re-elected in 1990. Redistricted to the at-large district. |
District eliminated January 3, 1993
District re-established January 3, 2023
| Ryan Zinke (Whitefish) | Republican | January 3, 2023 – present | 118th 119th | Elected in 2022. Re-elected in 2024. Retiring at the end of term. |
| Sam Forstag (Missoula) | Democratic | Assuming office on January 3, 2027 | 120th | Elected in 2026. |

== Recent election results ==
=== 2022 ===
2022 Montana's 1st congressional district election
| Party | Candidate | Votes | % |
|---|---|---|---|
| Republican | Ryan Zinke | 123,102 | 49.6 |
| Democratic | Monica Tranel | 115,265 | 46.5 |
| Libertarian | John Lamb | 9,593 | 3.9 |
| Total votes | | 247,960 | 100.0 |
| Republican win (new seat) | | | |

=== 2024 ===
2024 Montana's 1st congressional district election
| Party | Candidate | Votes | % |
|---|---|---|---|
| Republican | Ryan Zinke (incumbent) | 168,529 | 52.3 |
| Democratic | Monica Tranel | 143,783 | 44.6 |
| Libertarian | Dennis Hayes | 9,954 | 3.1 |
| Total votes | | 322,266 | 100.0 |
| Republican hold | | | |

== See also ==
- Montana's congressional districts
- List of United States congressional districts
