= Montana Highway 44 =

State highway in Montana, United States

Montana Highway 44
- Valier Highway
- MT 44 highlighted in red

Route information
- Maintained by MDT
- Length: 28.390 mi (45.689 km)

Major junctions
- West end: US 89 near Dupuyer
- East end: I-15 near Conrad

Location
- Country: United States
- State: Montana
- Counties: Pondera

Highway system
- Montana Highway System; Interstate; US; State; Secondary
← MT 43	→ MT 47

Montana Highway 44 is a state highway in the U.S. state of Montana. The route begins at US 89 near Dupuyer and ends as Interstate 15, intersecting with former US 91 along the way.

== Route description ==
Montana highway 44 begins at U.S. Route 89 about 10 miles (16 km) north of Dupuyer. Known as the Valier Highway, it proceeds due-east before intersecting with Original Road. A quick turn to the south east brings the intersection with Westwind Road. The highway executes another turn to the south before once again moving due-east. Shortly thereafter, an intersection with Dupuyer Cutoff Road occurs, before the highway intersects West Heights Road.

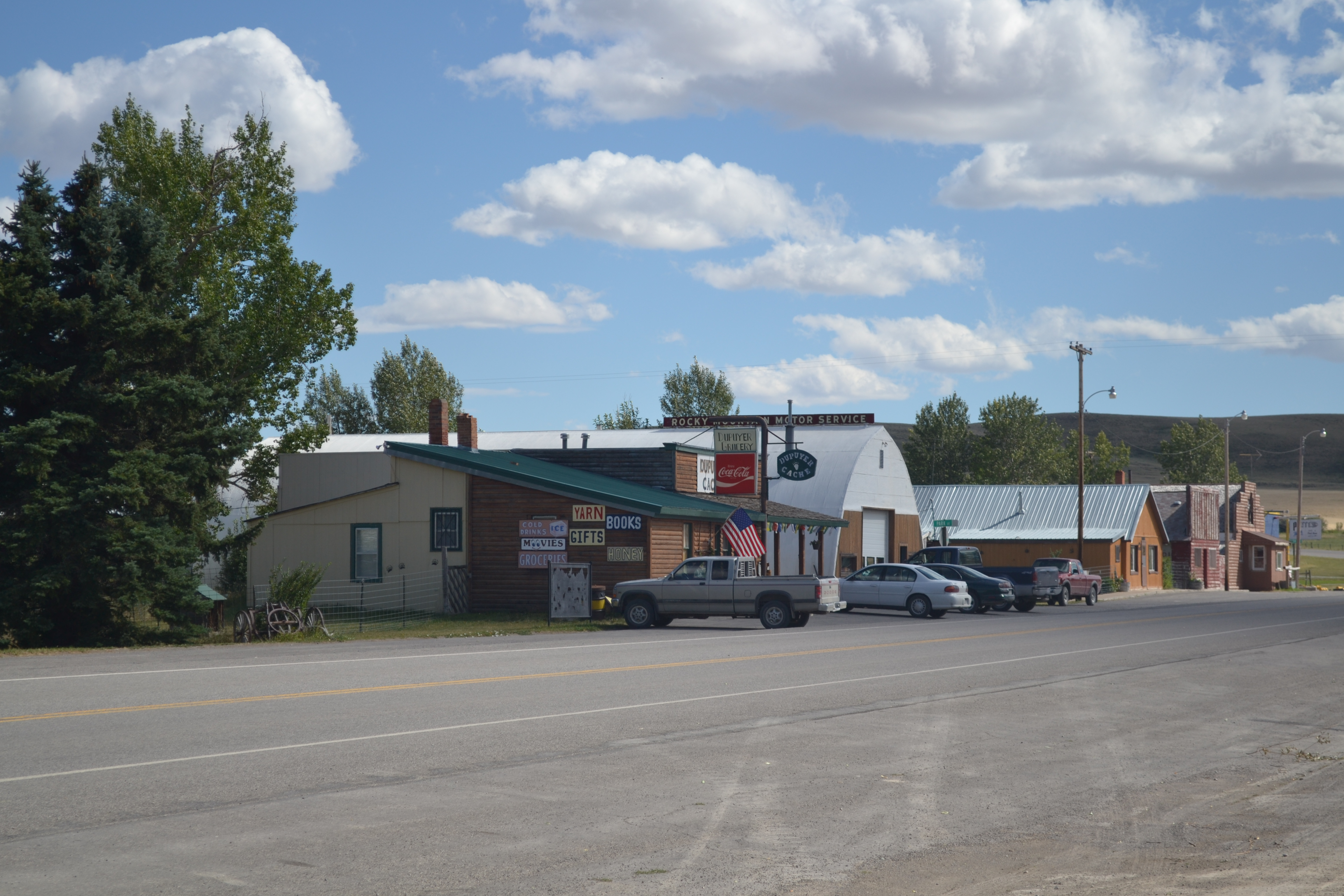
Highway through Dupuyer, Montana

The highway enters Valier, and intersects Montana Secondary Highway 358. As it does so, it travels along the northern shore of Lake Frances. An intersection with Division Street follows, and the highway continues east. After intersecting several local roads, Montana Highway 44 intersects with former U.S. Route 91 and terminates at Interstate 15.

== History ==
Montana Highway 44 was originally Montana Highway 216.

== Major intersections ==
The entire route is in Pondera County.

Location	mi	km	Destinations	Notes
	0.000	0.000	US 89 – Choteau, Browning, Glacier National Park	
Valier	13.896	22.363	S-358	
	28.390	45.689	I-15 – Great Falls, Shelby	I-15 exit 348
1.000 mi = 1.609 km; 1.000 km = 0.621 mi
