= Dupuyer Creek =

Location
- Country: Teton and Pondera counties in Montana

Physical characteristics
- Source
  - coordinates: 48°05′37″N 112°41′30″W
- Mouth
  - coordinates: 48°18′07″N 112°20′07″W
  - elevation: 3,704 feet (1,129 m)

Basin features
- River system: Missouri River

Dupuyer Creek is a tributary of Birch Creek in northwestern Montana in the United States.

It rises at the confluence of the South Fork, Middle Fork and North Fork in the Lewis and Clark National Forest east of the continental divide in northwestern Teton County at an elevation near 4750 feet. It flows northwest into Pondera County, past Dupuyer, and joins Birch Creek in Pondera County 3 mi (4.8 km) west of Valier.

== See also ==
- List of rivers of Montana
- Montana Stream Access Law
