= Kingsbury Colony, Montana =

- Census-designated place
- Location within Montana Location within the United States
- Coordinates: 48°18′16″N 112°29′05″W
- Country: United States
- State: Montana
- County: Pondera

Area
  - Total: 0.39 sq mi (1.00 km^{2})
  - Land: 0.39 sq mi (1.00 km^{2})
  - Water: 0 sq mi (0.00 km^{2})
- Elevation: 3,865 ft (1,178 m)

Population (2020)
  - Total: 96
  - Density: 249.5/sq mi (96.34/km^{2})
- Time zone: UTC-7 (Mountain (MST))
  - Summer (DST): UTC-6 (MDT)
- ZIP Code: 59486 (Valier)
- Area code: 406
- FIPS code: 30-40720
- GNIS feature ID: 2806656

Kingsbury Colony is a Hutterite community and census-designated place (CDP) in Pondera County, Montana, United States. It is in the west-central part of the county, just south of Montana Highway 44. The community is 12 miles (19 km) west of Valier, and 11 miles (18 km) north of Dupuyer (via U.S. Route 89).

Kingsbury Colony was first listed as a CDP prior to the 2020 census. As of the 2020 census, Kingsbury Colony had a population of 96.

== Demographics ==
Historical population
Census	Pop.	Note	%±
2020	96		—
U.S. Decennial Census

== Education ==
Valier Public Schools is the area school district. The school district is made of these components: Valier Elementary School District and the Valier High School District.
