= Midway Colony, Montana =

- Census-designated place
- Location within Montana Location within the United States
- Coordinates: 48°04′02″N 111°59′49″W
- Country: United States
- State: Montana
- County: Pondera

Area
  - Total: 0.53 sq mi (1.36 km^{2})
  - Land: 0.53 sq mi (1.36 km^{2})
  - Water: 0 sq mi (0.00 km^{2})
- Elevation: 3,862 ft (1,177 m)

Population (2020)
  - Total: 100
  - Density: 190.0/sq mi (73.35/km^{2})
- Time zone: UTC-7 (Mountain (MST))
  - Summer (DST): UTC-6 (MDT)
- ZIP Code: 59425 (Conrad)
- Area code: 406
- FIPS code: 30-49418
- GNIS feature ID: 2806658

Midway Colony is a Hutterite community and census-designated place (CDP) in Pondera County, Montana, United States. As of the 2020 census, Midway Colony had a population of 100. It is in the southeastern part of the county, 8 miles (13 km) southwest of Conrad, the county seat, and 9 miles (14 km) northwest of Brady.

The community was first listed as a CDP prior to the 2020 census.

== Demographics ==
Historical population
Census	Pop.	Note	%±
2020	100		—
U.S. Decennial Census

== Education ==
It is in a single K-12 school district, Dutton/Brady K-12 Schools.
