= Strawberry Fire (2017) =

2017 wildfire in Montana, United States

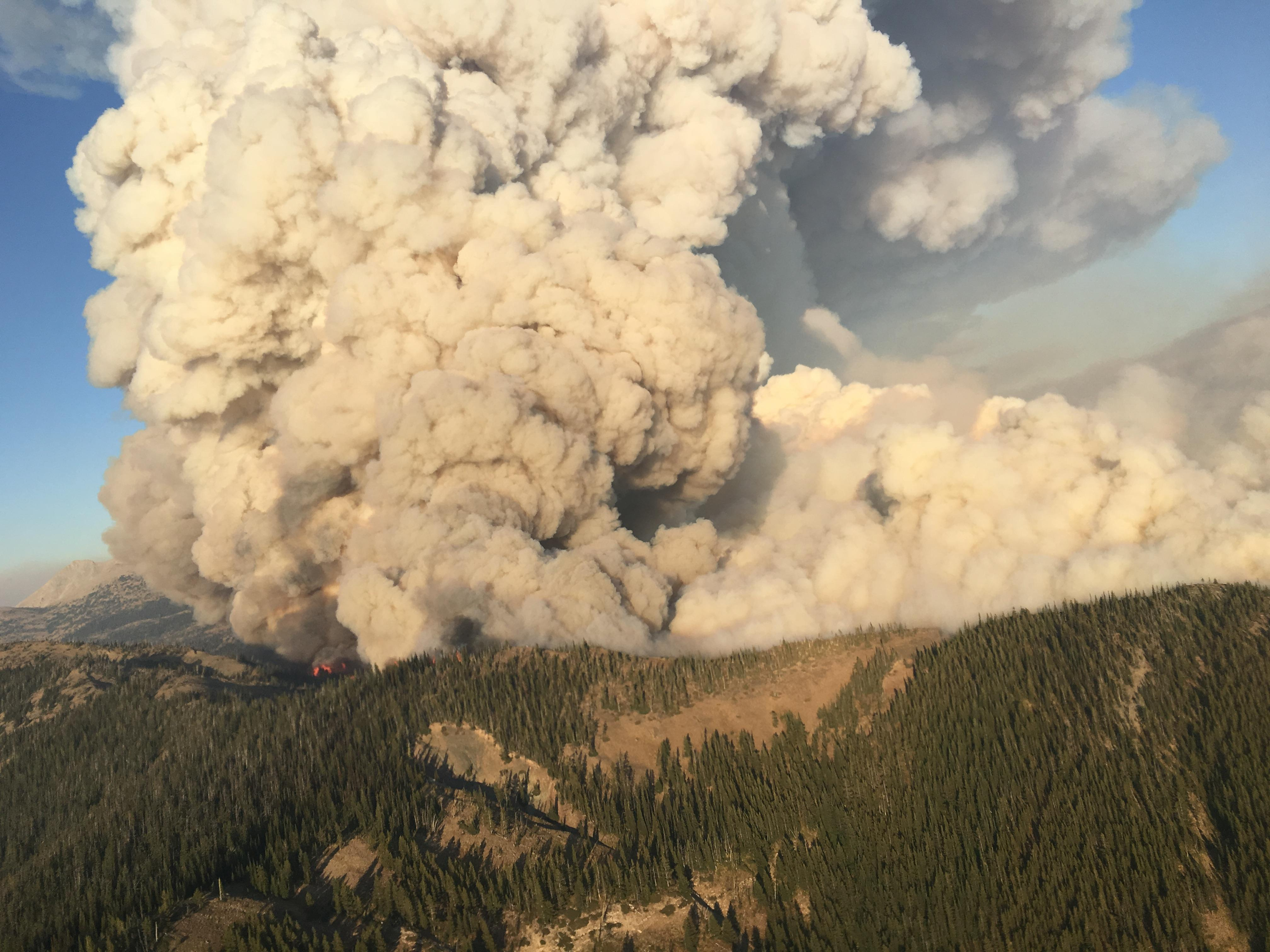
- Strawberry Fire on September 11, 2017
- Date: August 25, 2017 – November 1, 2017
- Location: Flathead National Forest, Montana, United States
- Coordinates: 48.089°N 113.015°W

Statistics
- Burned area: 30,461 acres (123 km^{2})

Ignition
- Cause: Lightning

Map
- Location of fire in Montana.

The Strawberry Fire was a wildfire burning eight miles south of Swift Reservoir in the Flathead National Forest in the Bob Marshall Wilderness in Montana in the United States. The fire was started by lightning and was reported on August 25, 2017. It has burned a total of 30,461 acres (123 km^{2}). The fire threatened communities around the Swift Reservoir, including tribal lands of the Blackfeet Nation and Heart Butte, Montana. Its estimated containment date was November 1, 2017.

== Events ==
The Strawberry Fire was started by a lightning strike on August 25, 2017, approximately 1.5 miles southwest of Swift Dam near Dupuyer, Montana. The fire moved up to the west side of Mount Richmond, one mile from the Swift Reservoir. The Swift Dam Campground was closed along with areas around the fire in Flathead National Forest.

By September 12, the fire had expanded rapidly to 11,325 acres (46 km^{2}) due to heavy winds. The fire burned in Birch Creek, resulting in mandatory evacuations of homes and ranches in an area from Heart Butte to Birch Creek and Birch Creek to Ben English Coulee. The next day, the fire was burning up Strawberry Creek and on a ridge between Cap Mountain and Winter Points. The area around the Cox Creek drainage was closed and structure protection was put in place at Sabido Cabin.

== Evacuations and closures ==
Closures were in place for forest areas surrounding the fire.
