= Poia =

Poia may refer to:

- Poia, Bihar, a village in Bihar, India
- Poia Lake, a lake in Montana, USA
- Poia, Trentino, a community in Lomaso, Trentino, Italy
- Mount Poia, a mountain in Pondera County, Montana, United States
- Poia, a community in Ponte di Legno, Val Camonica, Brescia, Lombardy, Italy
- Poia, a 1907 opera by American composer Arthur Nevin
- Poia, guitarist for Italian band Ufomammut

== See also ==
- Poias, one of the Argonauts in Greek mythology
