= George H. Shanley =

American architect

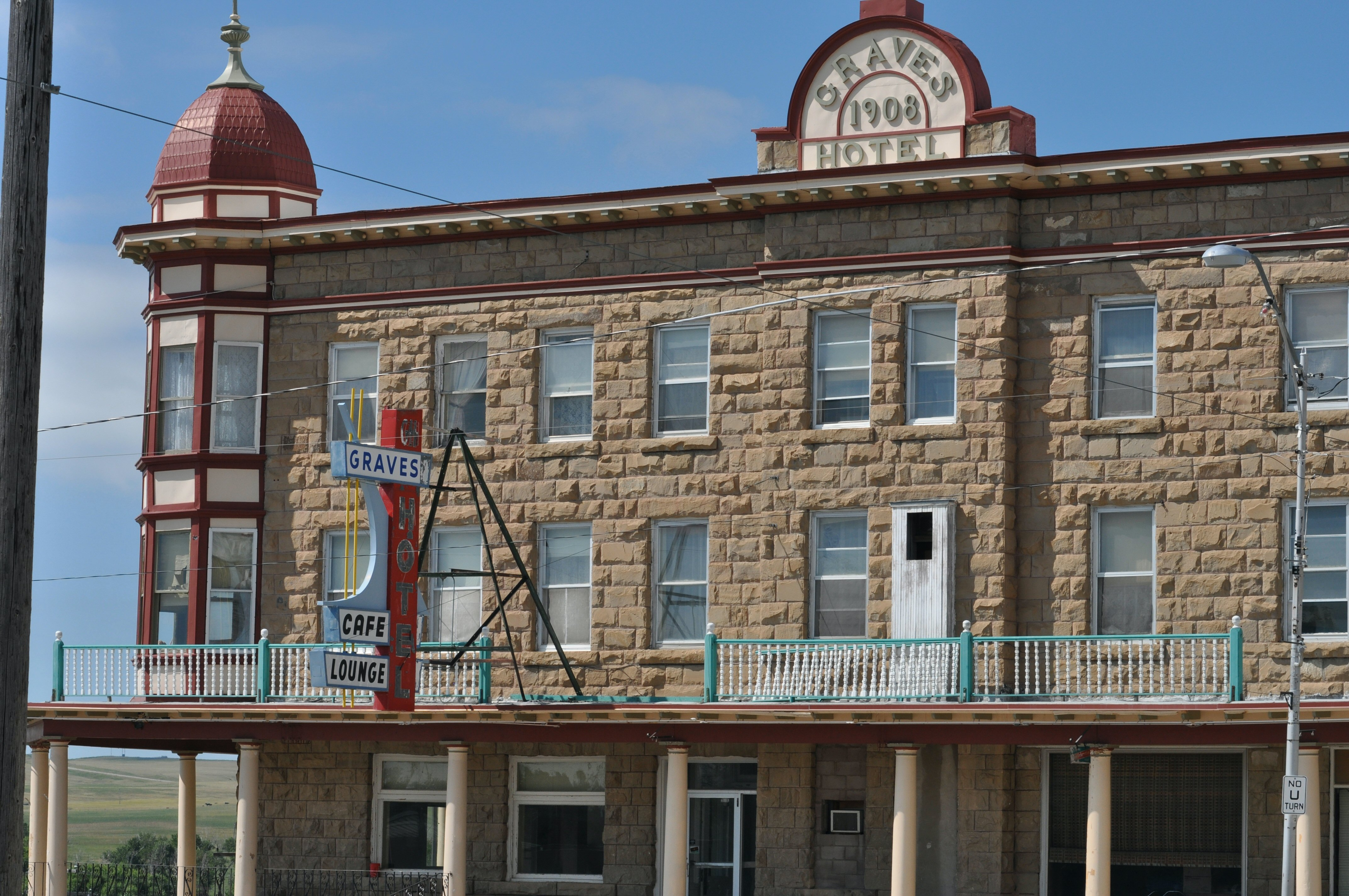
Graves Hotel, Montana

George H. Shanley was an architect of Great Falls, Montana.

According to a 1920 Bismarck, North Dakota newspaper article, Shanley was a specialist in designing newspaper publishing plants. He designed works from "education, commercial, residential, and hotel buildings to concrete arch bridges." He worked alone and with partners.

A number of his works are listed on the U.S. National Register of Historic Places.

Works include (with attribution):

- Bismarck Tribune Building, 22 N. 4th St. Bismarck, ND (Shanley, George H.), NRHP-listed
- Graves Hotel, (1908-1909), 106 S. Central Ave. Harlowton, MT (Kent & Shanley), NRHP-listed
- One or more works in Great Falls Central Business Historic District, Second Ave.N, First Ave.N, Central Ave., First Ave S. Great Falls, MT (Shanley, George), NRHP-listed
- One or more works in Great Falls Northside Residential Historic District, 200-900 blocks 4th Ave. N., 100-900 blocks 3rd Ave. N. and 500-900 blocks 2nd Ave. N. Great Falls, MT (Shanley, George), NRHP-listed
- Independent Telephone Company Building, 207 E. Main St. Missoula, MT Shanley, George), NRHP-listed
- One or more works in Main Street Commercial Historic District (Kalispell, Montana), 34-343 Main St. and 116-142 1st Ave. E. Kalispell, MT (Shanley, George), NRHP-listed
- Neihart School, 200 S. Main St. Neihart, MT Shanley, George), NRHP-listed
- One or more works in Northern Montana State Fairground Historic District, 3rd St., NW Great Falls, MT (Shanley, George M.), NRHP-listed
- Tenth Street Bridge, a concrete arch bridge bringing 10th St. across the Missouri River, Great Falls, MT (Shanley, George), NRHP-listed
- Teton County Courthouse (Choteau, Montana), 1 Main Ave. S Choteau, MT (Shanley, George H.), NRHP-listed
- Ursuline Academy (Great Falls, Montana), 2300 Central Ave. Great Falls, MT (Shanley, George H.), NRHP-listed
- Valier Public School, 820 3rd St. Valier, MT (Shanley, George H.), NRHP-listed
