= Rockport Colony, Montana =

- Census-designated place
- Location within Montana Location within the United States
- Coordinates: 48°4′0″N 112°28′32″W
- Country: United States
- State: Montana
- County: Teton

Area
  - Total: 0.22 sq mi (0.57 km^{2})
  - Land: 0.22 sq mi (0.57 km^{2})
  - Water: 0 sq mi (0.00 km^{2})
- Elevation: 4,410 ft (1,340 m)

Population (2020)
  - Total: 0
  - Density: 0/sq mi (0/km^{2})
- Time zone: UTC-7 (Mountain (MST))
  - Summer (DST): UTC-6 (MDT)
- ZIP Code: 59467 (Pendroy)
- Area code: 406
- FIPS code: 30-63590
- GNIS feature ID: 2806672

Rockport Colony is a Hutterite community and census-designated place (CDP) in Teton County, Montana, United States. It is in the northern part of the county, 10 miles (16 km) south of Dupuyer and 25 miles (40 km) northwest of Choteau, the Teton county seat.

Rockport Colony was first listed as a CDP prior to the 2020 census. As of the 2020 census, Rockport Colony had a population of 0.

== Demographics ==
Historical population
Census	Pop.	Note	%±
2020	0		—
U.S. Decennial Census
