= Lake Frances =

Lake Frances may refer to:

United States

- Lake Frances (Glacier County, Montana), a lake in Glacier County, Montana
- Lake Frances (Pondera County, Montana), a lake in Pondera County, Montana
- Lake Frances (Wayne County, Michigan), a manmade lake in Palmer Park in Detroit, Michigan

See also

- Frances Lake, a lake in Yukon, Canada
- Lake Francis (disambiguation)
- Francis Lake (disambiguation)
