= Scott Curry =

Scott Curry may refer to:

- Scott Curry (American football) (born 1975), American football offensive tackle
- Scott Curry (rugby union) (born 1988), New Zealand rugby union player
