= Pondera Colony, Montana =

- Census-designated place
- Location within Montana Location within the United States
- Coordinates: 48°14′24″N 112°25′05″W
- Country: United States
- State: Montana
- County: Pondera

Area
  - Total: 0.24 sq mi (0.61 km^{2})
  - Land: 0.24 sq mi (0.61 km^{2})
  - Water: 0 sq mi (0.00 km^{2})
- Elevation: 3,990 ft (1,220 m)

Population (2020)
  - Total: 113
  - Density: 483.0/sq mi (186.48/km^{2})
- Time zone: UTC-7 (Mountain (MST))
  - Summer (DST): UTC-6 (MDT)
- ZIP Code: 59486 (Valier)
- Area code: 406
- FIPS code: 30-58834
- GNIS feature ID: 2806660

Pondera Colony is a Hutterite community and census-designated place (CDP) in Pondera County, Montana, United States. As of the 2020 census, Pondera Colony had a population of 113. It is in the west-central part of the county, 8 miles (13 km) northeast of Dupuyer and 9 miles (14 km) southwest of Valier.

Pondera Colony was first listed as a CDP prior to the 2020 census.

== Demographics ==
Historical population
Census	Pop.	Note	%±
2020	113		—
U.S. Decennial Census

== Education ==
It is in the Dupuyer Elementary School District and the Valier High School District.
