= Birch Creek Colony, Montana =

- Census-designated place
- Location within Montana Location within the United States
- Coordinates: 48°14′56″N 112°28′11″W
- Country: United States
- State: Montana
- County: Pondera

Area
  - Total: 0.47 sq mi (1.23 km^{2})
  - Land: 0.47 sq mi (1.23 km^{2})
  - Water: 0 sq mi (0.00 km^{2})
- Elevation: 3,970 ft (1,210 m)

Population (2020)
  - Total: 120
  - Density: 251.8/sq mi (97.22/km^{2})
- Time zone: UTC-7 (Mountain (MST))
  - Summer (DST): UTC-6 (MDT)
- ZIP Code: 59486 (Valier)
- Area code: 406
- FIPS code: 30-06815
- GNIS feature ID: 2806655

Birch Creek Colony is a Hutterite community and census-designated place (CDP) in Pondera County, Montana, United States. As of the 2020 census, Birch Creek Colony had a population of 120. It is in the west-central part of the county, 5 miles (8 km) north of Dupuyer and 13 miles (21 km) southwest of Valier.

The community was first listed as a CDP prior to the 2020 census.

== Demographics ==
Historical population
Census	Pop.	Note	%±
2020	120		—
U.S. Decennial Census

== Education ==
It is in the Dupuyer Elementary School District and the Valier High School District.
