= New Rockport Colony, Montana =

- Census-designated place
- Location within Montana Location within the United States
- Coordinates: 47°52′12″N 112°01′46″W
- Country: United States
- State: Montana
- County: Teton

Area
  - Total: 3.51 sq mi (9.09 km^{2})
  - Land: 3.51 sq mi (9.09 km^{2})
  - Water: 0 sq mi (0.00 km^{2})
- Elevation: 3,730 ft (1,140 m)

Population (2020)
  - Total: 194
  - Density: 55.3/sq mi (21.34/km^{2})
- Time zone: UTC-7 (Mountain (MST))
  - Summer (DST): UTC-6 (MDT)
- ZIP Codes: 59422 (Choteau); 59433 (Dutton)
- Area code: 406
- FIPS code: 30-53500
- GNIS feature ID: 2806670

New Rockport Colony is a Hutterite community and census-designated place (CDP) in Teton County, Montana, United States. It is in the east-central part of the county, 11 miles (18 km) northeast of Choteau, the county seat, and 16 miles (26 km) west of Dutton. The colony sits on a bluff overlooking the Teton River to the southeast and Spring Coulee to the northeast. As of the 2020 census, New Rockport Colony had a population of 194.

The community was first listed as a CDP prior to the 2020 census.

== Demographics ==
Historical population
Census	Pop.	Note	%±
2020	194		—
U.S. Decennial Census
