= Birch Creek (Pondera County, Montana) =

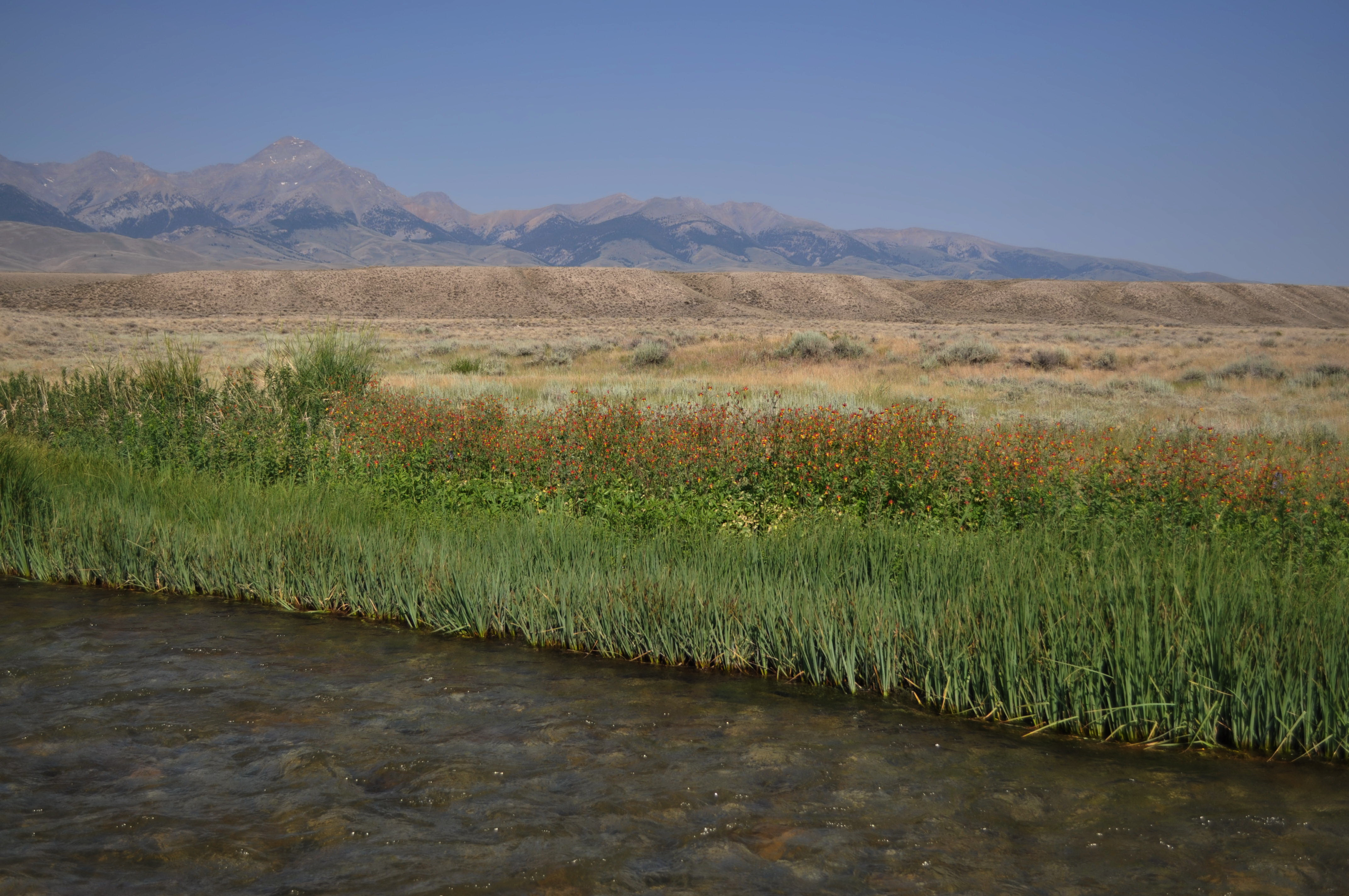
- Birch Creek and Lemhi Range

Location
- Country: Pondera County, Montana

Physical characteristics
- Source
  - coordinates: 48°08′44″N 113°01′33″W
- Mouth
  - coordinates: 48°26′34″N 112°15′40″W
  - elevation: 3,353 feet (1,022 m)
- Discharge
  - location: Valier
  - average: 85 cu ft/s (2.4 m^{3}/s)

Basin features
- River system: Missouri River

Birch Creek is a tributary of the Two Medicine River in Montana in the United States. It rises at the continental divide in the Lewis and Clark National Forest, and flows northeast, through Swift Reservoir. It receives Dupuyer Creek and joins the Two Medicine in northern Pondera County. It forms part of the southern border of the Blackfeet Indian Reservation.

== See also ==
- List of rivers of Montana
- Montana Stream Access Law
