= Scarface Mountain =

Scarface Mountain may refer to the following mountains in the United States:

- Scarface Mountain (Montana)
- Scarface Mountain (New York)
