= Francis Lake =

Francis Lake may refer to:

== Canada ==
- Francis Lake (Vancouver Island), in British Columbia

== United States ==
- Francis Lake (California), in El Dorado County, California
- Francis Lake (New York), in Lewis County, New York

== See also ==
- Frances Lake, in Yukon, Canada
- Francia Lake, in Bolivia
- Lake Frances (disambiguation)
- Lake Francis (disambiguation)
