= New Miami Colony, Montana =

- Census-designated place
- Location within Montana Location within the United States
- Coordinates: 48°11′28″N 112°16′50″W
- Country: United States
- State: Montana
- County: Pondera

Area
  - Total: 0.38 sq mi (0.98 km^{2})
  - Land: 0.38 sq mi (0.98 km^{2})
  - Water: 0 sq mi (0.00 km^{2})
- Elevation: 3,858 ft (1,176 m)

Population (2020)
  - Total: 297
  - Density: 783.7/sq mi (302.59/km^{2})
- Time zone: UTC-7 (Mountain (MST))
  - Summer (DST): UTC-6 (MDT)
- ZIP Code: 59425 (Conrad)
- Area code: 406
- FIPS code: 30-53476
- GNIS feature ID: 2806659

New Miami Colony is a Hutterite community and census-designated place (CDP) in Pondera County, Montana, United States. As of the 2020 census, New Miami Colony had a population of 297. It is near the center of the county, 10 miles (16 km) east of Dupuyer and 18 miles (29 km) west of Conrad, the county seat.

New Miami Colony was first listed as a CDP prior to the 2020 census.

== Demographics ==
Historical population
Census	Pop.	Note	%±
2020	297		—
U.S. Decennial Census

== Education ==
It is in the following school districts: Miami Elementary School District and Conrad High School District.
