= Strawberry Fire =

Strawberry Fire may refer to:

- Strawberry Fire (2016), a Nevada wildfire
- Strawberry Fire (2017), a Montana wildfire
