= Conrad City Hall =

- U.S. National Register of Historic Places
- Location within Montana Location within the United States
- Location: 15 4th Ave., SW. Conrad, Montana
- Coordinates: 48°10′10″N 111°56′49″W
- Area: 0.2 acres (0.081 ha)
- Built: 1916
- NRHP reference No.: 80002429
- Added to NRHP: February 1, 1980

Conrad City Hall is a site on the National Register of Historic Places located in Conrad, Montana. It was added to the Register on February 1, 1980. The building is the oldest government building surviving in Pondera County, and it is still used as the public library.

It was built at instigation of a women's club, the Conrad Woman's Club. It was built with architectural style and local brick which was standard for downtown buildings in Conrad in its era, but at date of NRHP listing was one of only four such buildings surviving. It was deemed significant for its association with social, political, and government activities of the region.
