= Lake Francis =

Lake Francis may refer to:

United States

- Lake Francis, in Dobbins, Yuba County, California
- Lake Francis (Murphy Dam), in Coös County, New Hampshire
- Lake Francis (South Dakota), in Deuel County, South Dakota
- Lake Frances (Pondera County, Montana)

== See also ==
- Francis Lake (disambiguation)
- Lake Frances (disambiguation)
- Frances Lake, in Yukon, Canada
