= Tenth Street Bridge =

Tenth Street Bridge may refer to:

- Tenth Street Bridge (Pittsburgh, Pennsylvania)
- Tenth Street Bridge (Great Falls, Montana)
