= Agawam, Montana =

Unincorporated community in Montana, U.S.

Coordinates: 48°59′53″N 112°10′05″W

Agawam is an unincorporated community in Teton County, in the U.S. state of Montana.

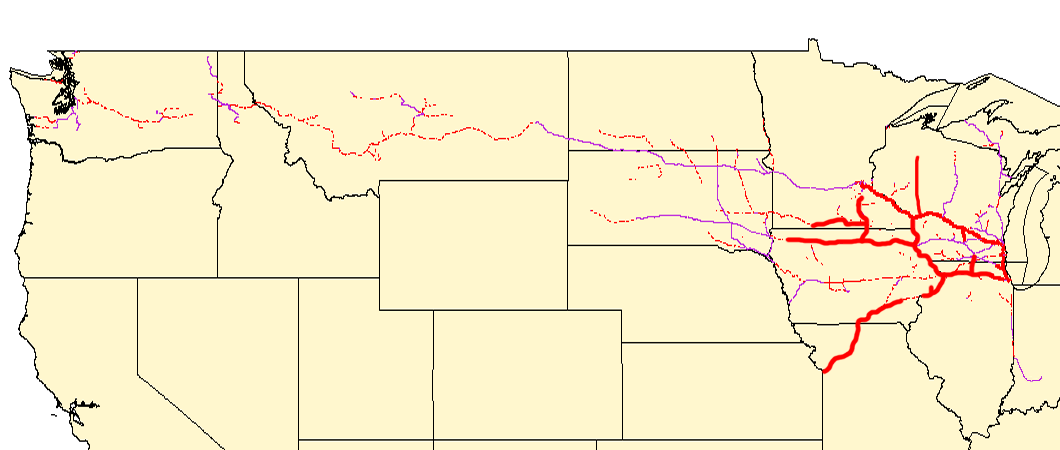
Agawam was the terminus station for the Northern Montana route.

== History ==
A post office was established at Agawam in 1913, and remained in operation until it was discontinued in 1956. The community took its name after Agawam, Massachusetts.

Agawam was home to the terminus station for the Milwaukee Road Northern Montana Division.
