= Bismarck Tribune Building =

- U.S. National Register of Historic Places
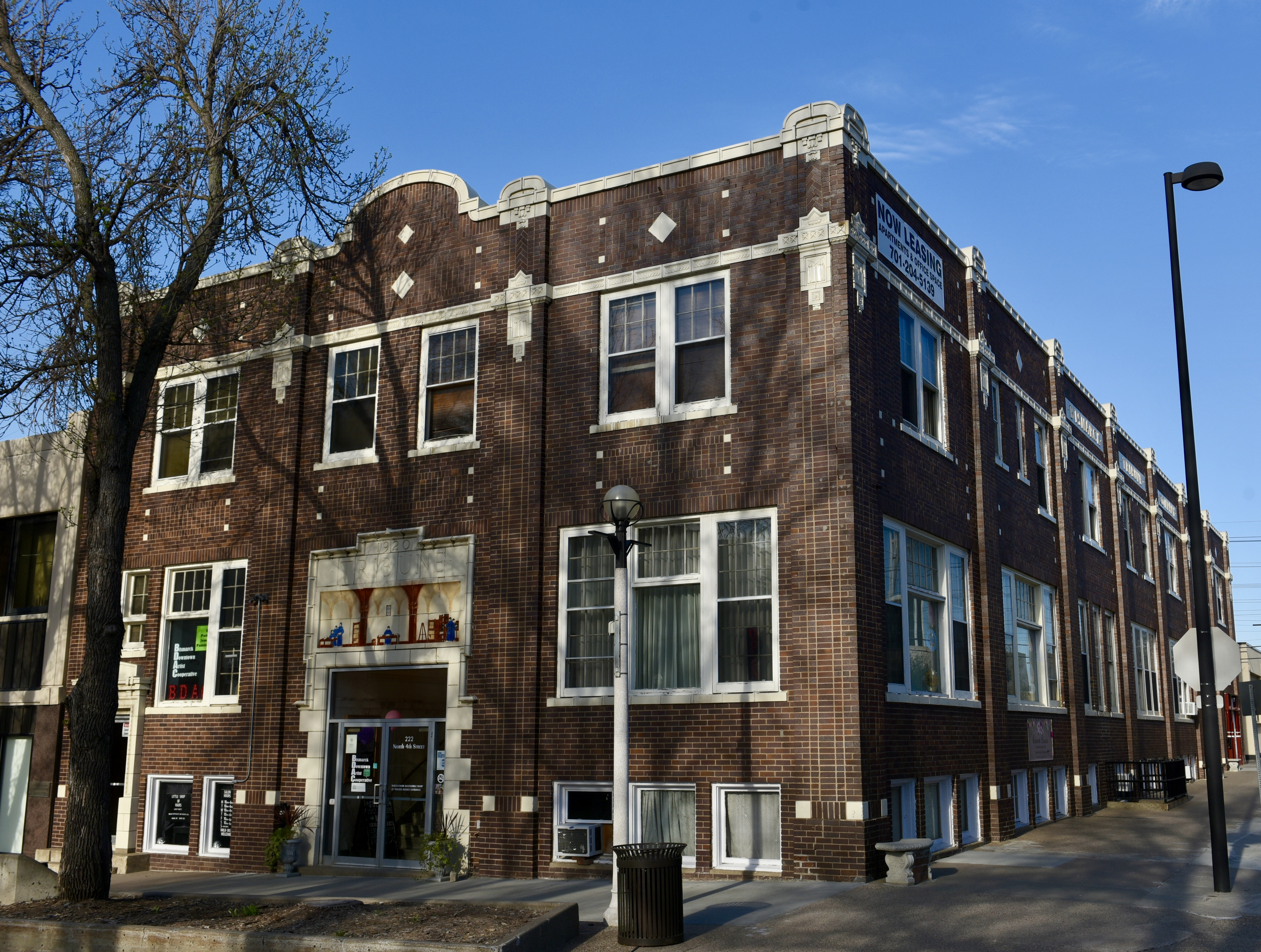

- Location within North Dakota Location within the United States
- Location: 22 N. 4th St. Bismarck, North Dakota
- Coordinates: 46°48′26″N 100°47′10″W
- Area: less than one acre
- Built: 1920
- Architect: Shanley, George H.
- Architectural style: Prairie School
- NRHP reference No.: 82001309
- Added to NRHP: October 22, 1982

The Bismarck Tribune Building on N. 4th St. in Bismarck, North Dakota was designed by architect George H. Shanley and was built in 1920.

It was listed on the National Register of Historic Places (NRHP) in 1982.

According to its NRHP nomination it is a "rare application" of Prairie School architecture in North Dakota.

The editor, George Douglas Mann, recruited a Great Falls, Montana, designer to plan this flame resistant structure with substantial casing and floors, primary mud tile dividers, and Hebron pressed block outside. The famous Prairie Style configuration accentuates flat extents and joins enhancing brickwork with applied earthenware decoration with themes of adapted lights, blossoms, leaves, and lotus buds. Block header courses emphasize the pilasters that help rectangular spandrels between the first-and second-floor windows. A particular polychrome earthenware bas-help board over the fundamental passage recreates a work of art of priests rehearsing the printer's art on a hand press. The Bismarck Tribune Building has filled in as office space since the newspaper relocated its operations in 1981.

== See also ==
- Link to photograph at State Historical Society of North Dakota
