= Frank Akins =

American football player (1919–1992)

No. 39, 18, 21
- Position: Running back

Personal information
- Born: March 31, 1919; Dutton, Montana, U.S.
- Died: July 6, 1992 (aged 73); Redding, California, U.S.
- Listed height: 5 ft 10 in (1.78 m)
- Listed weight: 208 lb (94 kg)

Career information
- High school: John R. Rogers (WA)
- College: Washington State (1939-1942)
- NFL draft: 1943: 30th round, 290th overall pick

Career history
- Washington Redskins (1943–1946); Los Angeles Bulldogs (1948)

Career NFL statistics
- Rushing yards: 1,142
- Rushing average: 4.7
- Touchdowns: 7
- Stats at Pro Football Reference

Frank Scott Akins (March 31, 1919 – July 6, 1992) was an American football running back who played for the Washington Redskins of the National Football League (NFL). He played college football at Washington State University and was drafted in the 30th round of the 1943 NFL draft. He taught history and drivers education at Anderson High School, Anderson, CA.

== NFL career statistics ==
Legend
	Led the league
**Bold**	Career high

Year	Team	Games		Rushing					Receiving				
Year	Team	GP	GS	Att	Yds	Avg	Lng	TD	Rec	Yds	Avg	Lng	TD
1943	WAS	6	0	10	25	2.5	11	0	1	51	**51.0**	**51**	0
1944	WAS	6	1	46	154	3.3	15	1	5	27	5.4	9	0
1945	WAS	10	2	**147**	**797**	**5.4**	**45**	**6**	**8**	**57**	7.1	18	0
1946	WAS	6	2	41	166	4.0	16	0	2	15	7.5	8	0
Career		28	5	244	1,142	4.7	45	7	16	150	9.4	51	0
