= Teton County Courthouse (Montana) =

- U.S. National Register of Historic Places
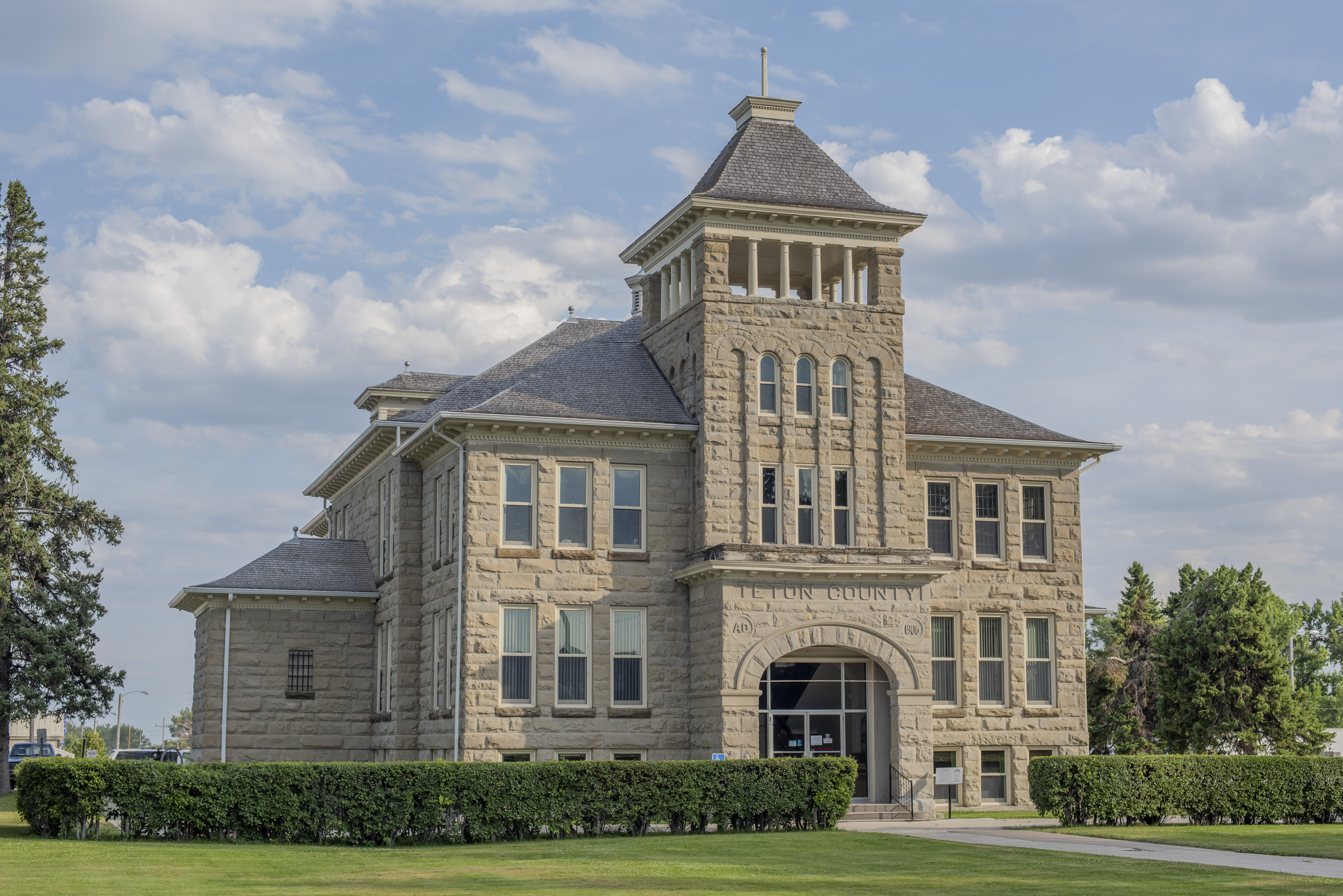

- Location within Montana Location within the United States
- Interactive map showing the location of Teton County Courthouse
- Location: 1 Main Ave. S, Choteau, Montana
- Coordinates: 47°48′39″N 112°10′53″W
- Area: less than one acre
- Built: 1906
- Architect: Gibson, Joseph B.; Shanley, George H.
- Architectural style: Renaissance
- NRHP reference No.: 06001093
- Added to NRHP: November 29, 2006

The Teton County Courthouse, located at 1 Main Ave. S. in Choteau, is the county courthouse serving Teton County, Montana. Built in 1906, thirteen years after Teton County was formed, the building was the county's first permanent courthouse. Architects Joseph B. Gibson and George H. Shanley designed the courthouse in the Renaissance Revival style. The 2 1/2-story building was built using locally quarried ashlar sandstone. The building's design features an arched entrance topped by a square tower, dentillated eaves, and a hip roof with three dormers.

The courthouse was listed on the National Register of Historic Places on November 29, 2006.
