= Miller Colony, Montana =

- Census-designated place
- Location within Montana Location within the United States
- Coordinates: 47°55′33″N 112°17′30″W
- Country: United States
- State: Montana
- County: Teton

Area
  - Total: 0.37 sq mi (0.95 km^{2})
  - Land: 0.37 sq mi (0.95 km^{2})
  - Water: 0 sq mi (0.00 km^{2})
- Elevation: 4,036 ft (1,230 m)

Population (2020)
  - Total: 9
  - Density: 24.6/sq mi (9.51/km^{2})
- Time zone: UTC-7 (Mountain (MST))
  - Summer (DST): UTC-6 (MDT)
- ZIP Code: 59422 (Choteau)
- Area code: 406
- FIPS code: 30-49750
- GNIS feature ID: 2806669

Miller Colony is a Hutterite community and census-designated place (CDP) in Teton County, Montana, United States. It is in the north-central part of the county, just west of U.S. Route 89, 10 miles (16 km) northwest of Choteau, the county seat, and 4 miles (6 km) south of Bynum.

As of the 2020 census, Miller Colony had a population of nine.

Miller Colony was first listed as a CDP prior to the 2020 census.

== Demographics ==
Historical population
Census	Pop.	Note	%±
2020	9		—
U.S. Decennial Census
