= Dutton/Brady Public School District =

School district in Montana, United States

Dutton/Brady Public School District is a school district headquartered in Dutton, Montana.

It is a single K-12 school district. Part of the district is in Teton County, where it includes Dutton. Another part is in Pondera County, where it includes Brady and Midway Colony.

== History ==
Erica Allen was superintendent until 2022, when she resigned so she work in an education program by the University of Montana. Jeremy Locke, previously the principal of the elementary school, became the superintendent replacing Allen.

== Schools ==
Three of the institutions, Dutton/Brady Elementary School, Dutton/Brady Middle School, and Dutton/Brady High School, are at the same school building, the Dutton/Brady School in Dutton. It also has a PK-8 school at Midway Colony.

Previously it had a separate middle school in Brady. In 2008 the school district board of trustees voted to close it. Two board members from Brady opposed the closure but the three other board members voted to close the school. Of the employers in Brady, the school provided the most jobs.
