= Dutton, Montana =

- Town
- Location of Dutton, Montana
- Coordinates: 47°50′51″N 111°42′52″W
- Country: United States
- State: Montana
- County: Teton
- Incorporated: 1935

Area
  - Total: 0.32 sq mi (0.82 km^{2})
  - Land: 0.32 sq mi (0.82 km^{2})
  - Water: 0 sq mi (0.00 km^{2})
- Elevation: 3,701 ft (1,128 m)

Population (2020)
  - Total: 303
  - Density: 958.1/sq mi (369.91/km^{2})
- Time zone: UTC-7 (Mountain (MST))
  - Summer (DST): UTC-6 (MDT)
- ZIP code: 59433
- Area code: 406
- FIPS code: 30-22600
- GNIS feature ID: 2412453
- Website: townofdutton.com

Dutton is a town in Teton County, Montana, United States. The population was 303 at the 2020 census.

The town was named for Charles E. Dutton, a general agent for Great Northern Railway. The town was originally a station on the branch line between Great Falls and Conrad.

== Geography ==
According to the United States Census Bureau, the town has a total area of 0.31 square miles (0.80 km^{2}), all land.

The landscape has rolling hills along with grassy meadows. The area is heavily given to agricultural pursuits. It is located in what is referred to as the "Golden Triangle", a region renowned for its wheat and barley production.

== Demographics ==
Historical population
| Census | Pop. | Note | %± |
|---|---|---|---|
| 1940 | 447 | | — |
| 1950 | 431 | | −3.6% |
| 1960 | 504 | | 16.9% |
| 1970 | 415 | | −17.7% |
| 1980 | 359 | | −13.5% |
| 1990 | 392 | | 9.2% |
| 2000 | 389 | | −0.8% |
| 2010 | 316 | | −18.8% |
| 2020 | 303 | | −4.1% |
U.S. Decennial Census

=== 2010 census ===
As of the census of 2010, there were 316 people, 149 households, and 92 families residing in the town. The population density was 1,019.4 inhabitants per square mile (393.6/km^{2}). There were 172 housing units at an average density of 554.8 units per square mile (214.2 units/km^{2}). The racial makeup of the town was 96.8% White, 0.3% Native American, and 2.8% from two or more races. Hispanic or Latino of any race were 4.1% of the population.

There were 149 households, of which 24.8% had children under the age of 18 living with them, 49.7% were married couples living together, 8.7% had a female householder with no husband present, 3.4% had a male householder with no wife present, and 38.3% were non-families. 36.9% of all households were made up of individuals, and 20.2% had someone living alone who was 65 years of age or older. The average household size was 2.12 and the average family size was 2.76.

The median age in the town was 48.9 years. 20.6% of residents were under the age of 18; 5.3% were between the ages of 18 and 24; 16.1% were from 25 to 44; 34.1% were from 45 to 64; and 23.7% were 65 years of age or older. The gender makeup of the town was 47.8% male and 52.2% female.

=== 2000 census ===
As of the census of 2000, there were 389 people, 158 households, and 111 families residing in the town. The population density was 1,242.7 inhabitants per square mile (479.8/km^{2}). There were 177 housing units at an average density of 565.5 units per square mile (218.3 units/km^{2}). The racial makeup of the town was 94.60% White, 0.26% African American, 1.29% Native American, 0.51% Asian, 1.54% from other races, and 1.80% from two or more races. Hispanic or Latino of any race were 2.83% of the population.

There were 158 households, out of which 31.6% had children under the age of 18 living with them, 61.4% were married couples living together, 5.1% had a female householder with no husband present, and 29.7% were non-families. 26.6% of all households were made up of individuals, and 17.7% had someone living alone who was 65 years of age or older. The average household size was 2.46 and the average family size was 2.99.

The age spread of the population is 27.5% under the age of 18, 3.1% from 18 to 24, 26.7% from 25 to 44, 25.2% from 45 to 64, and 17.5% who were 65 years of age or older. The median age was 41 years. For every 100 females there were 90.7 males. For every 100 females age 18 and over, there were 89.3 males.

The median income for a household in the town was $34,063, and the median income for a family was $43,068. Males had a median income of $31,563 versus $16,250 for females. The per capita income for the town was $14,638. About 11.3% of families and 8.0% of the population were below the poverty line, including 9.8% of those under age 18 and 2.5% of those age 65 or over.

== Arts and culture ==
Dutton Library serves the town.

== Education ==
The students of Brady, 15 miles (24 km) north, combine with Dutton to form one school district. Dutton/Brady Public School District educates students from kindergarten through 12th grade. In 2022, there were 134 students total enrolled in the district. Dutton/Brady High School's team name is the Diamond Backs.

== Media ==
Dutton is part of the Great Falls media market.

Dutton had its own print newspaper, The Dutton Wheat Center News, which was acquired by Fairfield Sun Times. The Sun Times maintains an archive of some of the original copies of The Wheat Center News.

The FM radio station KVVR is licensed in Dutton. It has an adult contemporary format.

== Infrastructure ==
Interstate 15 passes through the community, with access from Exit 313. Highway 221, travelling from Choteau, has its eastern terminus in Dutton.

== Notable people ==
- Frank Akins, Washington Redskins running back, was born in Dutton
- Lloyd J. Andrews, Washington state politician and businessman, was born in Dutton
