= List of mountains in Pondera County, Montana =

There are at least 28 named mountains in Pondera County, Montana.

- Black Buttes, 48°09′46″N 112°17′13″W, el. 4,167 feet (1,270 m)
- Bruin Peaks, 48°11′56″N 113°09′05″W, el. 7,703 feet (2,348 m)
- Bullshoe Mountain, 48°13′31″N 113°13′32″W, el. 8,008 feet (2,441 m)
- Conrad Butte, 48°17′59″N 111°41′25″W, el. 3,668 feet (1,118 m)
- Curly Bear Mountain, 48°11′49″N 113°04′50″W, el. 7,903 feet (2,409 m)
- Elbow Mountain, 48°10′37″N 113°06′54″W, el. 7,139 feet (2,176 m)
- Elkcalf Mountain, 48°17′05″N 113°17′52″W, el. 7,569 feet (2,307 m)
- Family Peak, 48°08′55″N 113°01′25″W, el. 8,094 feet (2,467 m)
- Feather Woman Mountain, 48°13′40″N 112°57′35″W, el. 7,592 feet (2,314 m)
- Flag Butte, 48°26′08″N 112°29′57″W, el. 4,176 feet (1,273 m)
- Flattop Mountain, 48°17′43″N 113°19′48″W, el. 6,614 feet (2,016 m)
- Goat Mountain, 48°13′08″N 113°08′30″W, el. 8,182 feet (2,494 m)
- Half Dome Crag, 48°16′15″N 113°04′46″W, el. 8,045 feet (2,452 m)
- Heart Butte, 48°14′31″N 112°55′17″W, el. 6,821 feet (2,079 m)
- Kiyo Crag, 48°17′37″N 113°06′29″W, el. 7,743 feet (2,360 m)
- Little Plume Peak, 48°16′32″N 113°00′35″W, el. 6,985 feet (2,129 m)
- Lookout Butte, 48°28′32″N 112°16′35″W, el. 3,734 feet (1,138 m)
- Morningstar Mountain, 48°11′25″N 113°01′50″W, el. 8,376 feet (2,553 m)
- Mount Poia, 48°10′57″N 112°59′56″W, el. 8,271 feet (2,521 m)
- Mount Richmond, 48°08′26″N 112°56′09″W, el. 8,166 feet (2,489 m)
- Running Crane Mountain, 48°14′51″N 113°14′13″W, el. 7,746 feet (2,361 m)
- Running Owl Mountain, 48°13′28″N 113°11′42″W, el. 7,828 feet (2,386 m)
- Sam George Hill, 48°10′47″N 112°02′20″W, el. 3,947 feet (1,203 m)
- Scarface Mountain, 48°10′48″N 113°01′12″W, el. 8,277 feet (2,523 m)
- Scoffin Butte, 48°08′43″N 112°41′46″W, el. 5,128 feet (1,563 m)
- Split Mountain, 48°08′26″N 112°48′51″W, el. 6,171 feet (1,881 m)
- Spotted Eagle Mountain, 48°11′16″N 113°04′21″W, el. 8,038 feet (2,450 m)
- Telephone Hill, 48°19′52″N 112°02′22″W, el. 4,019 feet (1,225 m)

== See also ==
- List of mountains in Montana
- List of mountain ranges in Montana
