= Valier Public School =

- U.S. National Register of Historic Places
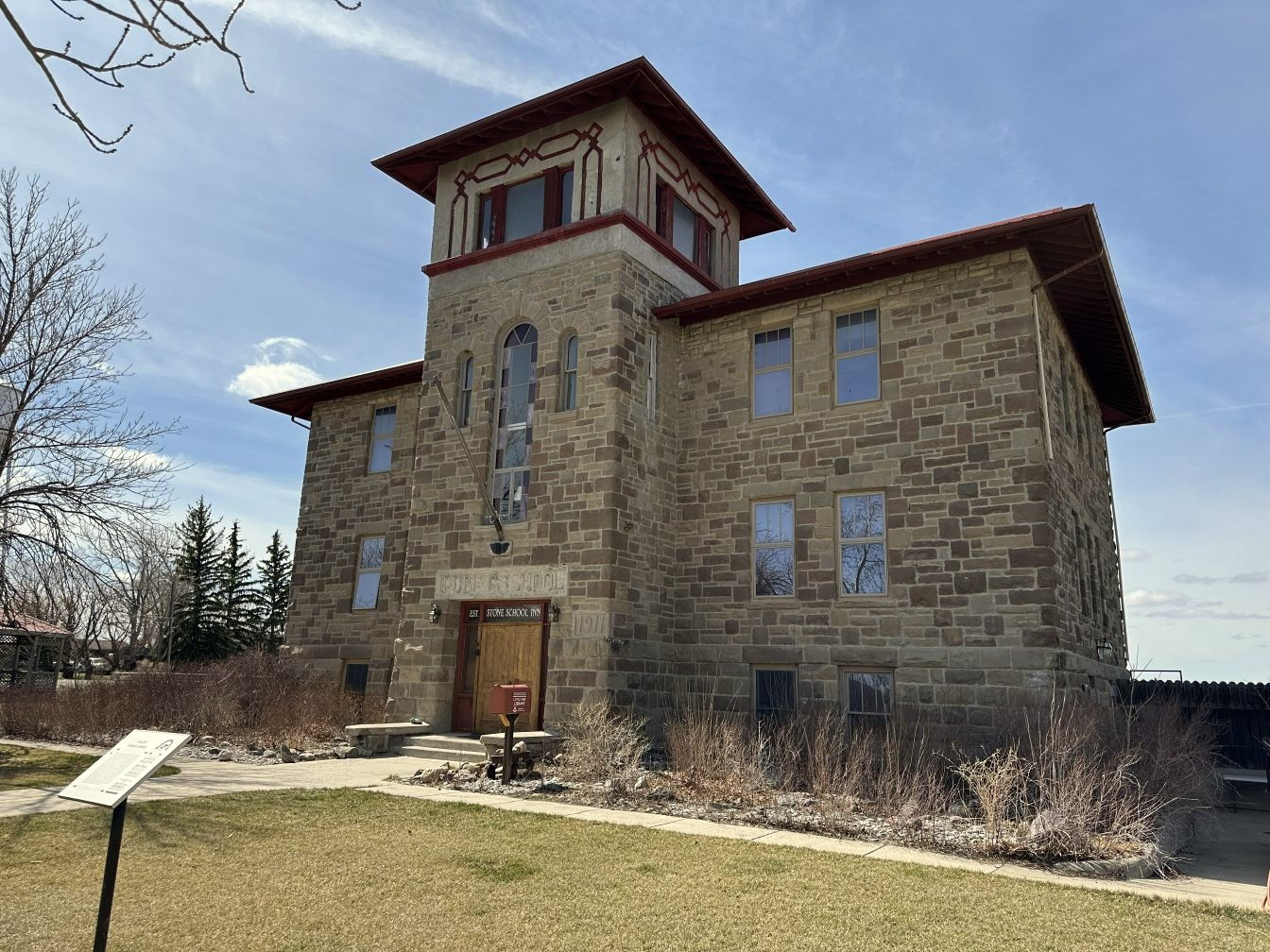

- Location within Montana Location within the United States
- Location: 820 3rd St., Valier, Montana
- Coordinates: 48°18′16″N 112°15′21″W
- Area: less than one acre
- Built: 1911
- Architect: Shanley, George H.
- NRHP reference No.: 85000646
- Added to NRHP: March 28, 1985

Valier Public School, also known as Old School House, is a site on the National Register of Historic Places located in Valier, Montana. It was added to the Register on March 28, 1985. The site is no longer in use.

It was built in 1911. In 1985 it was deemed significant "for its historical association with the early development of the town of Valier and as a fine example of stone architecture, designed by the prominent Montana architect, George H. Shanley of Great Falls. The construction of the 1911 school building in Valier demonstrates the high aspirations the citizens of Valier had for the future growth and prosperity of their community."
