= Teton County, Montana =

County in Montana, United States

- County
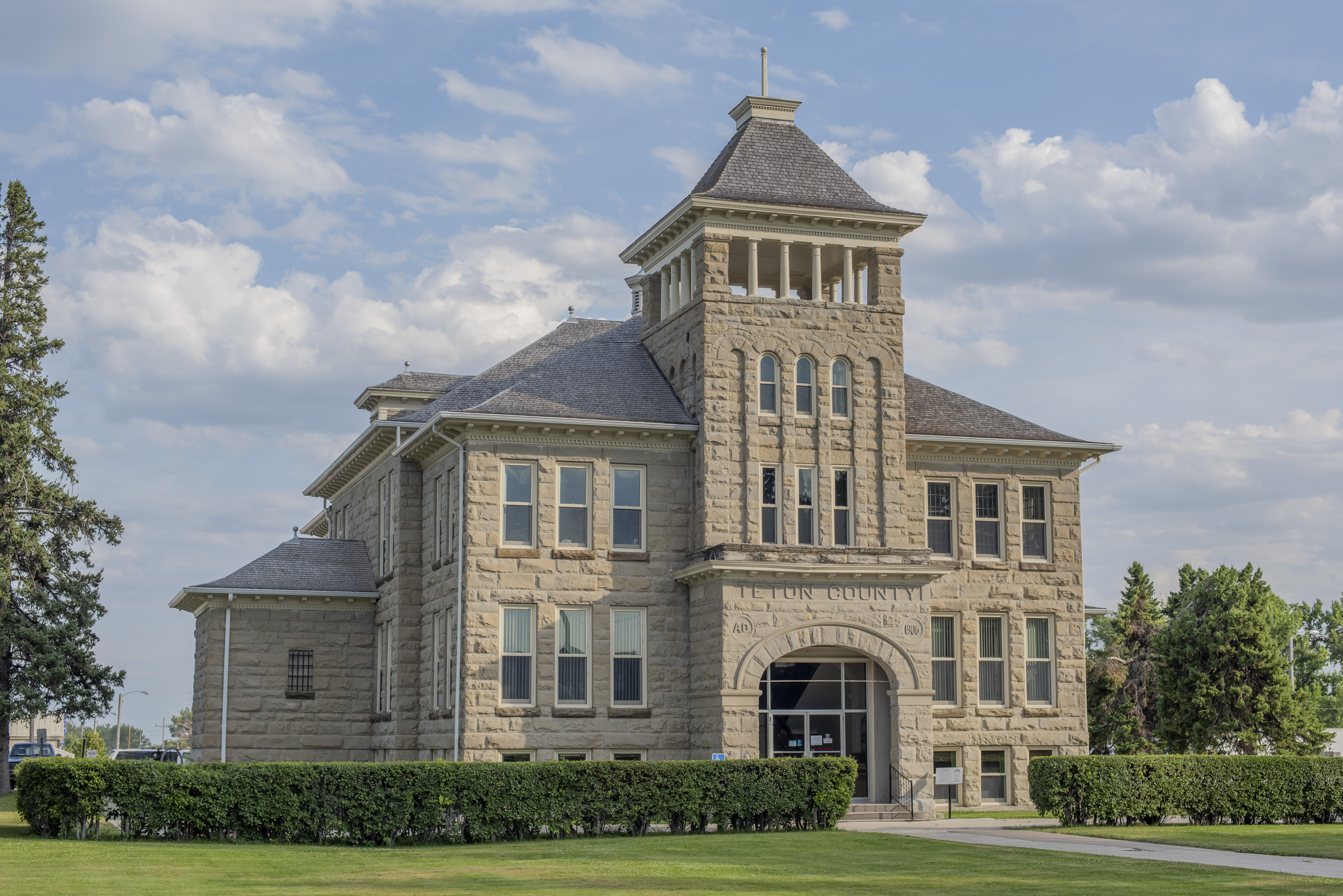
- Teton County Courthouse in Choteau

- Location within the U.S. state of Montana
- Coordinates: 47°51′N 112°14′W
- Country: United States
- State: Montana
- Founded: 1893
- Seat: Choteau
- Largest city: Choteau

Area
  - Total: 2,293 sq mi (5,940 km^{2})
  - Land: 2,272 sq mi (5,880 km^{2})
  - Water: 20 sq mi (52 km^{2}) 0.9%

Population (2020)
  - Total: 6,226
  - Estimate (2025): 6,496 ▲
  - Density: 2.8/sq mi (1.1/km^{2})
- Time zone: UTC−7 (Mountain)
  - Summer (DST): UTC−6 (MDT)
- Congressional district: 2nd
- Website: tetoncountymt.gov
- Montana county number 31

Teton County is a county in the U.S. state of Montana. As of the 2020 census, the population was 6,226. Its county seat is Choteau. The county was founded in 1893.

== Geography ==
According to the United States Census Bureau, the county has a total area of 2,293 square miles (5,940 km^{2}), of which 2,272 square miles (5,880 km^{2}) is land and 20 square miles (52 km^{2}) (0.9%) is water.

=== Adjacent counties ===
- Pondera County – north
- Chouteau County – east
- Cascade County – southeast
- Lewis and Clark County – south
- Flathead County – west

=== National protected area ===
- Lewis and Clark National Forest (part)
- Rocky Mountain Front Conservation Area (part)

== Demographics ==
Historical population
Census	Pop.	Note	%±
1900	5,080		—
1910	9,546		87.9%
1920	5,870		−38.5%
1930	6,068		3.4%
1940	6,922		14.1%
1950	7,232		4.5%
1960	7,295		0.9%
1970	6,116		−16.2%
1980	6,491		6.1%
1990	6,271		−3.4%
2000	6,445		2.8%
2010	6,073		−5.8%
2020	6,226		2.5%
2025 (est.)	6,496	▲	4.3%
U.S. Decennial Census

=== 2020 census ===
As of the 2020 census, the county had a population of 6,226.

Of the residents, 23.4% were under the age of 18 and 23.8% were 65 years of age or older; the median age was 45.1 years. For every 100 females there were 99.4 males, and for every 100 females age 18 and over there were 99.6 males.

0.0% of residents lived in urban areas and 100.0% lived in rural areas.

The racial makeup of the county was 91.3% White, 0.3% Black or African American, 1.6% American Indian and Alaska Native, 0.3% Asian, 0.7% from some other race, and 5.6% from two or more races. Hispanic or Latino residents of any race comprised 1.4% of the population.

There were 2,490 households in the county, of which 26.6% had children under the age of 18 living with them and 21.5% had a female householder with no spouse or partner present. About 30.3% of all households were made up of individuals and 16.3% had someone living alone who was 65 years of age or older.

There were 2,935 housing units, of which 15.2% were vacant. Among occupied housing units, 74.1% were owner-occupied and 25.9% were renter-occupied. The homeowner vacancy rate was 1.3% and the rental vacancy rate was 8.3%.

=== 2010 census ===
As of the 2010 census, there were 6,073 people, 2,450 households, and 1,643 families residing in the county. The population density was 2.7 inhabitants per square mile (1.0/km^{2}). There were 2,892 housing units at an average density of 1.3 units per square mile (0.50 units/km^{2}). The racial makeup of the county was 96.3% white, 1.4% American Indian, 0.1% Asian, 0.2% from other races, and 1.9% from two or more races. Those of Hispanic or Latino origin made up 1.3% of the population. In terms of ancestry, 40.2% were German, 14.7% were Norwegian, 14.5% were Irish, 11.9% were English, 6.4% were Swedish, 6.0% were Dutch, and 4.3% were American.

Of the 2,450 households, 25.7% had children under the age of 18 living with them, 58.2% were married couples living together, 6.0% had a female householder with no husband present, 32.9% were non-families, and 29.3% of all households were made up of individuals. The average household size was 2.29 and the average family size was 2.83. The median age was 45.8 years.

The median income for a household in the county was $39,516 and the median income for a family was $49,102. Males had a median income of $34,824 versus $24,419 for females. The per capita income for the county was $20,509. About 11.0% of families and 12.8% of the population were below the poverty line, including 13.3% of those under age 18 and 13.5% of those age 65 or over.

== Politics ==
Teton County voters have not selected the Democratic Party candidate in a national election since 1964.

United States presidential election results for Teton County, Montana
Year	Republican		Democratic		Third party(ies)	
Year	No.	%	No.	%	No.	%
1904	808	64.23%	420	33.39%	30	2.38%
1908	622	60.39%	358	34.76%	50	4.85%
1912	612	30.74%	646	32.45%	733	36.82%
1916	1,603	38.41%	2,273	54.47%	297	7.12%
1920	1,319	62.25%	671	31.67%	129	6.09%
1924	775	40.36%	396	20.63%	749	39.01%
1928	1,263	60.58%	804	38.56%	18	0.86%
1932	875	36.04%	1,496	61.61%	57	2.35%
1936	604	23.69%	1,917	75.18%	29	1.14%
1940	1,132	39.12%	1,735	59.95%	27	0.93%
1944	1,074	41.29%	1,508	57.98%	19	0.73%
1948	1,005	36.95%	1,632	60.00%	83	3.05%
1952	1,978	58.56%	1,389	41.12%	11	0.33%
1956	1,728	51.58%	1,622	48.42%	0	0.00%
1960	1,623	49.54%	1,648	50.31%	5	0.15%
1964	1,388	43.39%	1,808	56.52%	3	0.09%
1968	1,697	54.58%	1,228	39.50%	184	5.92%
1972	1,991	59.95%	1,121	33.75%	209	6.29%
1976	1,730	51.72%	1,506	45.02%	109	3.26%
1980	2,415	67.76%	902	25.31%	247	6.93%
1984	2,257	66.70%	1,102	32.57%	25	0.74%
1988	1,876	57.83%	1,303	40.17%	65	2.00%
1992	1,364	40.06%	1,043	30.63%	998	29.31%
1996	1,701	51.14%	1,188	35.72%	437	13.14%
2000	2,294	69.22%	847	25.56%	173	5.22%
2004	2,232	66.45%	1,047	31.17%	80	2.38%
2008	1,874	57.27%	1,294	39.55%	104	3.18%
2012	2,113	64.40%	1,082	32.98%	86	2.62%
2016	2,170	68.07%	808	25.35%	210	6.59%
2020	2,608	70.89%	1,007	27.37%	64	1.74%
2024	2,533	70.99%	927	25.98%	108	3.03%

== Communities ==
=== City ===
- Choteau (county seat)

=== Towns ===
- Dutton
- Fairfield

=== Census-designated places ===
- Bynum
- Miller Colony
- New Rockport Colony
- Pendroy
- Power
- Rockport Colony

=== Unincorporated communities ===
- Agawam
- Blackleaf Montana
- Collins
- Diamond Valley Montana
- Farmington Montana
- Golden Ridge Montana
- Koyl Montana
- Saypo

== Education ==
There is one PK-12 school district with territory in the county: Dutton/Brady Public School District.

High school districts include:

- Choteau High School District
- Fairfield High School District
- Power High School District

Elementary school districts include:

- Bynum Elementary School District
- Choteau Elementary School District
- Fairfield Elementary School District
- Golden Ridge Elementary School District
- Greenfield Elementary School District
- Pendroy Elementary School District
- Power Elementary School District

== Notable people ==
- Joe De Yong, artist, sculptor, illustrator, Hollywood movie technical advisor and protégé of Charles M. Russell; lived in Choteau, 1924
- John Edward Erickson, Teton County Attorney (1897–1905), governor of Montana
- Jill Barta, Overseas professional basketball player and coach.
- Gordon McOmber, Montana lieutenant governor

== See also ==
- List of lakes in Teton County, Montana
- List of mountains in Teton County, Montana
- National Register of Historic Places listings in Teton County, Montana
