= Francis Lake (Vancouver Island) =

- Location within Vancouver Island
- Location: Vancouver Island, British Columbia
- Coordinates: 48°57′00″N 124°42′00″W
- Lake type: Natural lake
- Basin countries: Canada

Francis Lake is a lake located on Vancouver Island west of Little Nitinat River and 40 km south of Port Alberni.

== See also ==
- List of lakes of British Columbia
