= Scarface Mountain (Montana) =

Mountain in Montana, United States

- Location within Montana

Highest point
- Elevation: 8,282 ft (2,524 m)
- Prominence: 682 ft (208 m)
- Isolation: 0.86 mi (1.38 km)
- Coordinates: 48°10′47″N 113°01′13″W

Geography
- Location: Pondera County; Montana, United States

Scarface Mountain is a mountain summit located in Pondera County, Montana.
