= Tenth Street Bridge (Great Falls, Montana) =

- U.S. National Register of Historic Places
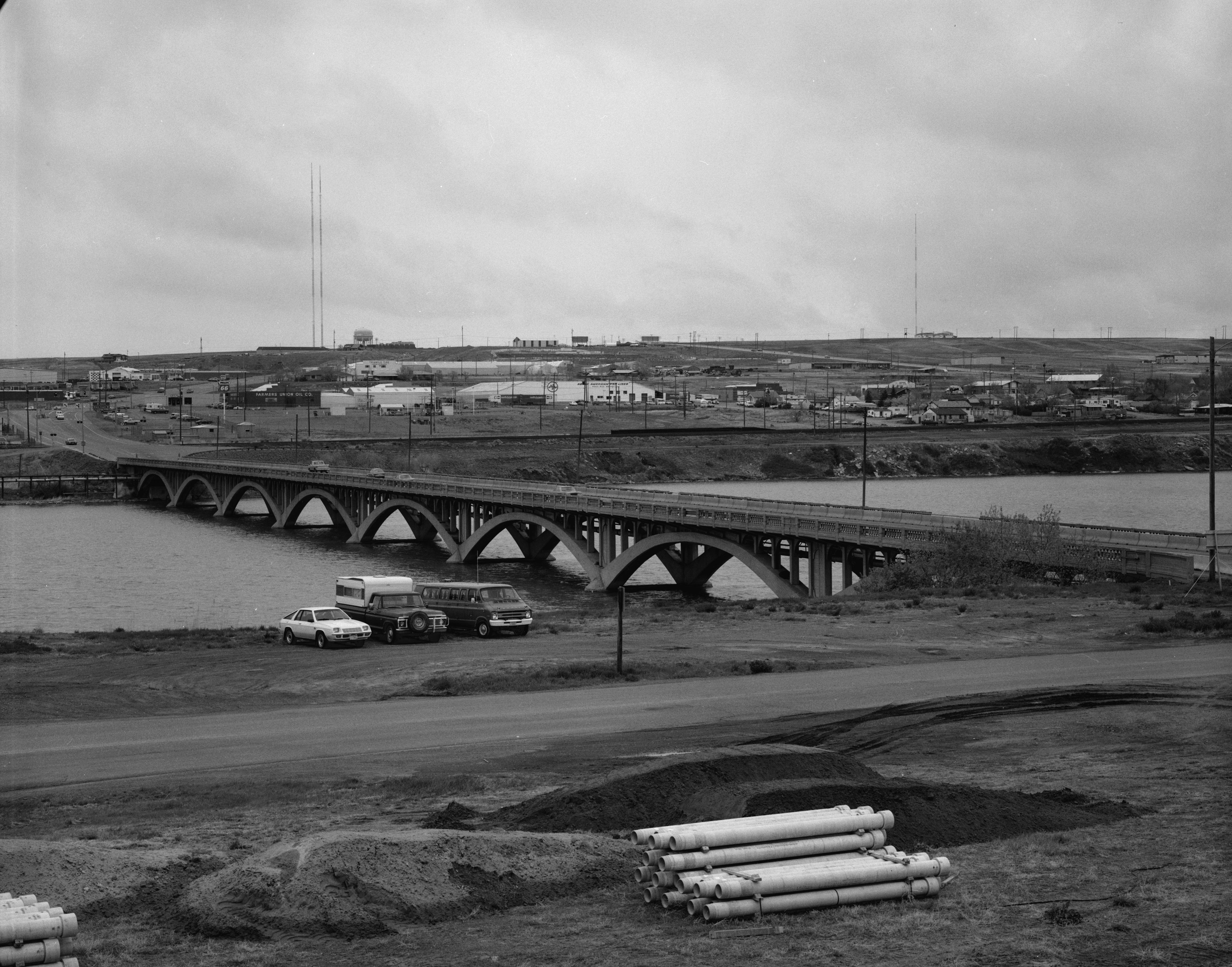
- Tenth Street Bridge in 1980

- Location within Montana Location within the United States
- Location: Great Falls, Montana
- Coordinates: 47°31′14″N 111°17′25″W
- Built: 1920
- Architect: George Shanley, Ralph Adams
- NRHP reference No.: 96000480
- Added to NRHP: April 25, 1996

The Tenth Street Bridge is a concrete arch bridge in Great Falls, Montana, spanning the Missouri River. The bridge was designed by engineer Ralph Adams of Spokane, Washington and Great Falls architect George Shanley, and was completed in 1920. It was the longest open-spandrel ribbed concrete arch bridge in Montana.

The construction of a new bridge at Ninth Street in the 1990s made the bridge redundant, and it was proposed for demolition. Preservationists successfully diverted demolition funds to bridge preservation, and the bridge was renovated to function as a pedestrian bridge between Great Falls and the Black Eagle community.

== See also ==
- List of bridges documented by the Historic American Engineering Record in Montana
