= Graves Hotel =

- U.S. National Register of Historic Places
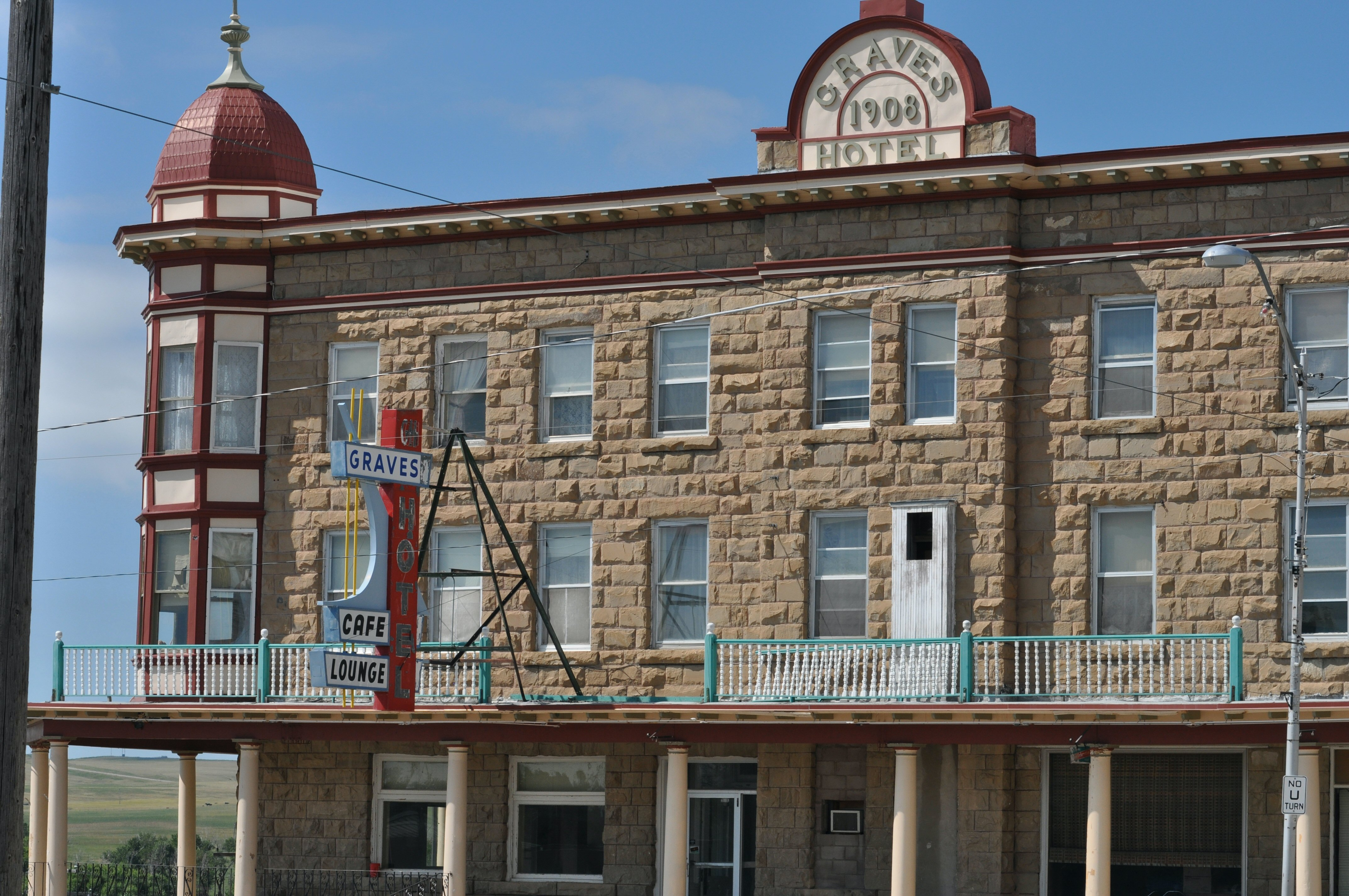

- Location within Montana Location within the United States
- Location: 106 S. Central Ave., Harlowton, Montana
- Coordinates: 46°26′01″N 109°49′50″W
- NRHP reference No.: 80002434
- Added to NRHP: August 6, 1980

The Graves Hotel was a historic hotel located at 106 South Central Avenue in Harlowton, Montana. A. C. Graves, a leading figure in Harlowton's early development, had the hotel built in 1909; it was one of the first businesses to be built after a fire destroyed much of downtown Harlowton in 1907. The hotel was the first sandstone building in Harlowton, though the stone eventually became a common building material; its design featured a projecting corner oriel window topped by a metal cupola. In addition to hosting visitors and railroad travelers, the hotel also served as a community meeting place and business center.

The hotel was added to the National Register of Historic Places on August 6, 1980.

The hotel was destroyed by a fire on February 12, 2023.
