= Swift Dam (Montana) =

Coordinates: 48°09′47″N 112°52′19″W

Swift Dam (National Inventory of Dams ID MT00581) is a dam in Pondera County, Montana, United States, on the southern end of the Blackfeet Indian Reservation.

The dam at was originally constructed around 1910, with a height of 157 feet (48 m). The embankment structure gave way on June 10, 1964, after heavy rains caused flooding on Birch Creek. The dam collapsed and sent a 30-foot (9.1 m) wall of water down the creek bed. The nearby dam at Lower Two Medicine Lake also failed, and at least 28 people were killed.

The current concrete-arch structure was completed in 1967, with a height of 205 feet (62 m), and a length at its crest of 573 feet (175 m). The reservoir is also contained by a secondary earthen dike (National Inventory of Dams ID MT00580) with a height of 53 feet (16 m) and a length of 457 feet (139 m), also completed in 1967. The dams and reservoir are owned and operated by the local Pondera Canal & Reservoir Company.

The reservoir, Swift Reservoir, has a maximum storage capacity of 34,000 acre-feet (42,000,000 m^{3}), normal storage of 30,000 acre-feet (37,000,000 m^{3}), and a normal elevation of 4,890 feet (1,490 m). Recreation is restricted to hiking in the area, with a parking area that requires Blackfeet Nation permission.
