= Brady, Montana =

- Census-designated place

- Location within Montana
- Coordinates: 48°02′08″N 111°50′24″W
- Country: United States
- State: Montana
- County: Pondera

Area
  - Total: 3.09 sq mi (8.00 km^{2})
  - Land: 3.09 sq mi (8.00 km^{2})
  - Water: 0 sq mi (0.00 km^{2})
- Elevation: 3,530 ft (1,080 m)

Population (2020)
  - Total: 116
  - Density: 37.5/sq mi (14.49/km^{2})
- Time zone: UTC-7 (Mountain (MST))
  - Summer (DST): UTC-6 (MDT)
- ZIP code: 59416
- Area code: 406
- GNIS feature ID: 802053

Brady is a census-designated place and unincorporated community in Pondera County, Montana, United States. As of the 2020 census, Brady had a population of 116. Brady has a post office with ZIP code 59416. The community is located along Interstate 15.

The post office was established in 1910. The town is likely named after the Brady brothers. Charles A. Brady was a physician, and Thomas E. Brady was an attorney.

Brady is a grain marketing and distribution center. The area is heavily given to agricultural pursuits. It is located in what is referred to as the "Golden Triangle", a region renowned for its wheat and barley production.

== Geography ==
=== Climate ===
According to the Köppen Climate Classification system, Brady has a semi-arid climate, abbreviated "BSk" on climate maps.

Climate data for Brady, Montana, 1991–2020 normals, extremes 1912–1982, 2013–present
Month	Jan	Feb	Mar	Apr	May	Jun	Jul	Aug	Sep	Oct	Nov	Dec	Year
Record high °F (°C)	66 (19)	70 (21)	77 (25)	89 (32)	102 (39)	106 (41)	110 (43)	110 (43)	102 (39)	92 (33)	78 (26)	70 (21)	110 (43)
Mean daily maximum °F (°C)	32.4 (0.2)	36.5 (2.5)	43.6 (6.4)	54.6 (12.6)	63.8 (17.7)	71.9 (22.2)	83.2 (28.4)	83.4 (28.6)	72.2 (22.3)	57.5 (14.2)	44.9 (7.2)	34.1 (1.2)	56.5 (13.6)
Daily mean °F (°C)	23.6 (−4.7)	26.2 (−3.2)	33.2 (0.7)	43.5 (6.4)	52.4 (11.3)	60.2 (15.7)	68.4 (20.2)	68.1 (20.1)	58.5 (14.7)	46.0 (7.8)	35.5 (1.9)	25.9 (−3.4)	45.1 (7.3)
Mean daily minimum °F (°C)	14.8 (−9.6)	15.9 (−8.9)	22.8 (−5.1)	32.4 (0.2)	40.9 (4.9)	48.4 (9.1)	53.6 (12.0)	52.7 (11.5)	44.8 (7.1)	34.5 (1.4)	26.1 (−3.3)	17.6 (−8.0)	33.7 (0.9)
Record low °F (°C)	−49 (−45)	−43 (−42)	−35 (−37)	−15 (−26)	5 (−15)	27 (−3)	29 (−2)	29 (−2)	10 (−12)	−12 (−24)	−33 (−36)	−46 (−43)	−49 (−45)
Average precipitation inches (mm)	0.41 (10)	0.37 (9.4)	0.48 (12)	1.24 (31)	1.99 (51)	2.67 (68)	1.22 (31)	1.13 (29)	1.14 (29)	0.87 (22)	0.48 (12)	0.49 (12)	12.49 (316.4)
Average snowfall inches (cm)	7.5 (19)	6.1 (15)	7.4 (19)	5.6 (14)	1.5 (3.8)	0.0 (0.0)	0.0 (0.0)	0.0 (0.0)	0.1 (0.25)	2.0 (5.1)	6.1 (15)	6.2 (16)	42.5 (107.15)
Average precipitation days (≥ 0.01 in)	4.3	4.3	5.5	7.8	9.7	10.7	6.9	5.9	6.0	5.6	3.4	4.6	74.7
Average snowy days (≥ 0.1 in)	3.5	3.5	3.3	2.2	0.7	0.0	0.0	0.0	0.1	1.2	2.0	3.6	20.1
Source 1: NOAA
Source 2: National Weather Service

== Demographics ==
Historical population
Census	Pop.	Note	%±
2020	116		—
U.S. Decennial Census

== Education ==
The students of Dutton, 15 miles (24 km) south, are combined with those of Brady to form one school district. Dutton/Brady Public School District, located in Dutton, educates students from kindergarten through 12th grade. In 2022, there were 134 students total enrolled in the district. Dutton/Brady High School's team name is the Diamond Backs.

Previously it had a separate middle school in Brady. In 2008 the school district board of trustees voted to close it. Two board members from Brady opposed the closure but the three other board members voted to close the school. Of the employers in Brady, the school provided the most jobs.

== Notable person ==
- George Montgomery, actor known for his roles in Westerns
