= Scott Curry (American football) =

American football player (born 1975)

No. 61
- Position: Offensive tackle

Personal information
- Born: December 25, 1975 (age 50); Conrad, Montana, U.S.
- Listed height: 6 ft 5 in (1.96 m)
- Listed weight: 300 lb (136 kg)

Career information
- High school: Valier (MT)
- College: Montana
- NFL draft: 1999: 6th round, 203rd overall pick

Career history
- Green Bay Packers (1999–2000)

Career NFL statistics
- Games: 5
- Games started: 0
- Stats at Pro Football Reference

Scott Curry (born December 25, 1975) was an American professional football offensive tackle in the National Football League (NFL). He was drafted by the Green Bay Packers in the sixth round of the 1999 NFL draft. Curry played in 5 games for the Packers in 1999. He was active with the Packers in 2000 but did not play, and he left the NFL after the 2000 season. He attended high school in Valier, Montana and college at the University of Montana.
