= Poia, Bihar =

Poia
- Village
- Location within Bihar
- Coordinates: 27.108°N 84.464°E
- Country: India
- State: Bihar
- District: West Champaran district

Languages
  - Official: Hindi
- Time zone: UTC+5:30 (IST)
- ISO 3166 code: IN-BR

Poia is a village in West Champaran district in the Indian state of Bihar.

== Demographics ==
As of the 2011 census of India, Poia had a population of 438 in 70 households. Males constitute 50.9% of the population and females 49%. Poia has an average literacy rate of 29.2%, lower than the national average of 74%: male literacy is 65.6%, and female literacy is 34.3%. In Poia, 16.891% of the population is under 6 years of age.
