= Lake Frances (Pondera County, Montana) =

- The top of the photo is southeast.

- Location within Montana Location within the United States
- Location: Pondera County, Montana
- Coordinates: 48°17′11.42″N 112°15′51.07″W
- Type: reservoir
- Basin countries: United States
- Surface area: 3,618 acres (14.64 km^{2})
- Surface elevation: 3,816 ft (1,163 m)

Lake Frances is a lake located southwest of Valier, Montana in Pondera County. Lake Frances is 3,618 acres (14.64 km^{2}) in size. The lake is a common destination for fisherman and water recreationists. The lake has Northern Pike, Walleye, and Perch as the major game fish. The lake has other fish as well. This lake previously required a warm water fish stamp to fish in Montana. Now Fish, Wildlife and Parks encourages donations to the warm water fish stamp funds, but does not require it. The lake is a hot spot for many ice fisherman. Valier is a small agriculture based town that is located right off the lake. There is a small island on the lake located on the north east side. There are animals that call this lake home such as the beaver, geese, ducks, deer, raccoons, and other small rodents.
