= Valier, Montana =

- Town
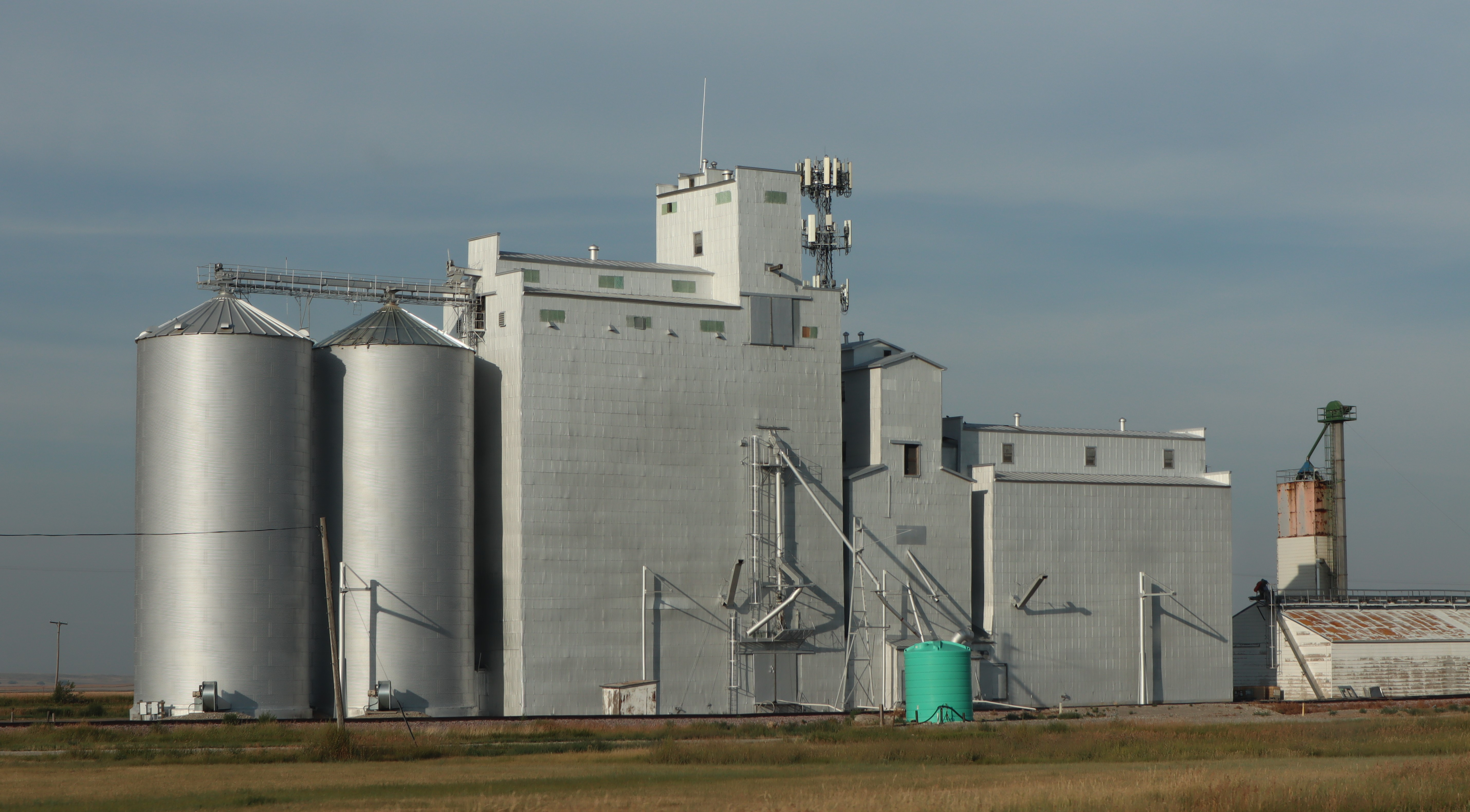
- Railroad grain elevator in Valier

- Location of Valier, Montana
- Coordinates: 48°18′18″N 112°14′57″W
- Country: United States
- State: Montana
- County: Pondera

Area
  - Total: 0.86 sq mi (2.24 km^{2})
  - Land: 0.86 sq mi (2.24 km^{2})
  - Water: 0 sq mi (0.00 km^{2})
- Elevation: 3,822 ft (1,165 m)

Population (2020)
  - Total: 530
  - Density: 612.4/sq mi (236.44/km^{2})
- Time zone: UTC-7 (Mountain (MST))
  - Summer (DST): UTC-6 (MDT)
- ZIP code: 59486
- Area code: 406
- FIPS code: 30-76225
- GNIS feature ID: 2413417
- Website: www.townofvalier.com

Valier is a town in Pondera County, Montana, United States. The population was 530 at the 2020 census.

== History ==
The town was named for Peter Valier, who supervised construction of the Montana Western Railway's railroad line between Valier and Conrad, the county seat of Pondera County. The town was incorporated in 1909.

== Geography ==
Valier borders Lake Frances. Pike, perch, walleye, and rainbow trout can all be found in the lake. The Swift Dam and its reservoir are also nearby.

The town is situated with the Rocky Mountain Front to the west and plains to the east.

According to the United States Census Bureau, the town has a total area of 0.92 square miles (2.38 km^{2}), all land.

=== Climate ===
According to the Köppen Climate Classification system, Valier has a semi-arid climate, abbreviated "BSk" on climate maps.

Climate data for Valier, Montana (1991–2020 normals, extremes 1911–present)
Month	Jan	Feb	Mar	Apr	May	Jun	Jul	Aug	Sep	Oct	Nov	Dec	Year
Record high °F (°C)	64 (18)	69 (21)	77 (25)	85 (29)	91 (33)	101 (38)	102 (39)	103 (39)	99 (37)	88 (31)	78 (26)	74 (23)	103 (39)
Mean daily maximum °F (°C)	35.1 (1.7)	37.3 (2.9)	45.5 (7.5)	55.1 (12.8)	64.4 (18.0)	71.4 (21.9)	81.5 (27.5)	81.2 (27.3)	71.6 (22.0)	57.1 (13.9)	43.1 (6.2)	34.9 (1.6)	56.5 (13.6)
Daily mean °F (°C)	24.0 (−4.4)	25.8 (−3.4)	33.3 (0.7)	42.6 (5.9)	51.7 (10.9)	59.1 (15.1)	66.8 (19.3)	66.0 (18.9)	57.3 (14.1)	44.9 (7.2)	32.9 (0.5)	25.0 (−3.9)	44.1 (6.7)
Mean daily minimum °F (°C)	13.0 (−10.6)	14.4 (−9.8)	21.1 (−6.1)	30.2 (−1.0)	39.0 (3.9)	46.7 (8.2)	52.2 (11.2)	50.7 (10.4)	43.1 (6.2)	32.8 (0.4)	22.7 (−5.2)	15.1 (−9.4)	31.8 (−0.1)
Record low °F (°C)	−43 (−42)	−49 (−45)	−35 (−37)	−21 (−29)	8 (−13)	28 (−2)	30 (−1)	28 (−2)	4 (−16)	−15 (−26)	−29 (−34)	−42 (−41)	−49 (−45)
Average precipitation inches (mm)	0.25 (6.4)	0.31 (7.9)	0.44 (11)	1.25 (32)	2.23 (57)	3.09 (78)	1.05 (27)	1.33 (34)	1.25 (32)	0.74 (19)	0.43 (11)	0.26 (6.6)	12.63 (321)
Average precipitation days (≥ 0.01 in)	3.8	4.2	4.7	6.4	8.2	10.6	5.8	5.9	5.3	4.9	4.2	3.5	67.5
Source: NOAA

== Demographics ==
Historical population
Census	Pop.	Note	%±
1920	613		—
1930	575		−6.2%
1940	641		11.5%
1950	710		10.8%
1960	724		2.0%
1970	651		−10.1%
1980	640		−1.7%
1990	519		−18.9%
2000	498		−4.0%
2010	509		2.2%
2020	530		4.1%
U.S. Decennial Census

=== 2010 census ===
As of the census of 2010, there were 509 people, 234 households, and 138 families living in the town. The population density was 553.3 inhabitants per square mile (213.6/km^{2}). There were 284 housing units at an average density of 308.7 units per square mile (119.2 units/km^{2}). The racial makeup of the town was 87.4% White, 8.1% Native American, 0.6% Asian, and 3.9% from two or more races. Hispanic or Latino of any race were 1.0% of the population.

There were 234 households, of which 22.6% had children under the age of 18 living with them, 46.6% were married couples living together, 8.5% had a female householder with no husband present, 3.8% had a male householder with no wife present, and 41.0% were non-families. 37.6% of all households were made up of individuals, and 17.1% had someone living alone who was 65 years of age or older. The average household size was 2.18 and the average family size was 2.88.

The median age in the town was 47.3 years. 21.8% of residents were under the age of 18; 7.3% were between the ages of 18 and 24; 17.6% were from 25 to 44; 31.9% were from 45 to 64; and 21.4% were 65 years of age or older. The gender makeup of the town was 48.1% male and 51.9% female.

=== 2000 census ===
As of the census of 2000, there were 498 people, 220 households, and 143 families living in the town. The population density was 418.5 inhabitants per square mile (161.6/km^{2}). There were 275 housing units at an average density of 231.1 units per square mile (89.2 units/km^{2}). The racial makeup of the town was 92.17% White, 5.22% Native American, and 2.61% from two or more races. Hispanic or Latino of any race were 1.20% of the population.

There were 220 households, out of which 29.5% had children under the age of 18 living with them, 53.2% were married couples living together, 7.3% had a female householder with no husband present, and 35.0% were non-families. 33.2% of all households were made up of individuals, and 18.6% had someone living alone who was 65 years of age or older. The average household size was 2.26 and the average family size was 2.87.

In the town, the population was spread out, with 24.5% under the age of 18, 5.0% from 18 to 24, 24.1% from 25 to 44, 26.1% from 45 to 64, and 20.3% who were 65 years of age or older. The median age was 43 years. For every 100 females there were 105.8 males. For every 100 females age 18 and over, there were 94.8 males.

The median income for a household in the town was $30,000, and the median income for a family was $36,750. Males had a median income of $25,156 versus $16,875 for females. The per capita income for the town was $14,862. About 7.9% of families and 8.4% of the population were below the poverty line, including 3.5% of those under age 18 and 17.0% of those age 65 or over.

== Economy ==
Agriculture, including cattle ranching, is the main industry in the area. There are three Hutterite colonies nearby.

== Government ==
Valier has a mayor-council form of government. In 2023 there were 4 aldermen and Glenn Wunderlich was mayor.

== Education ==
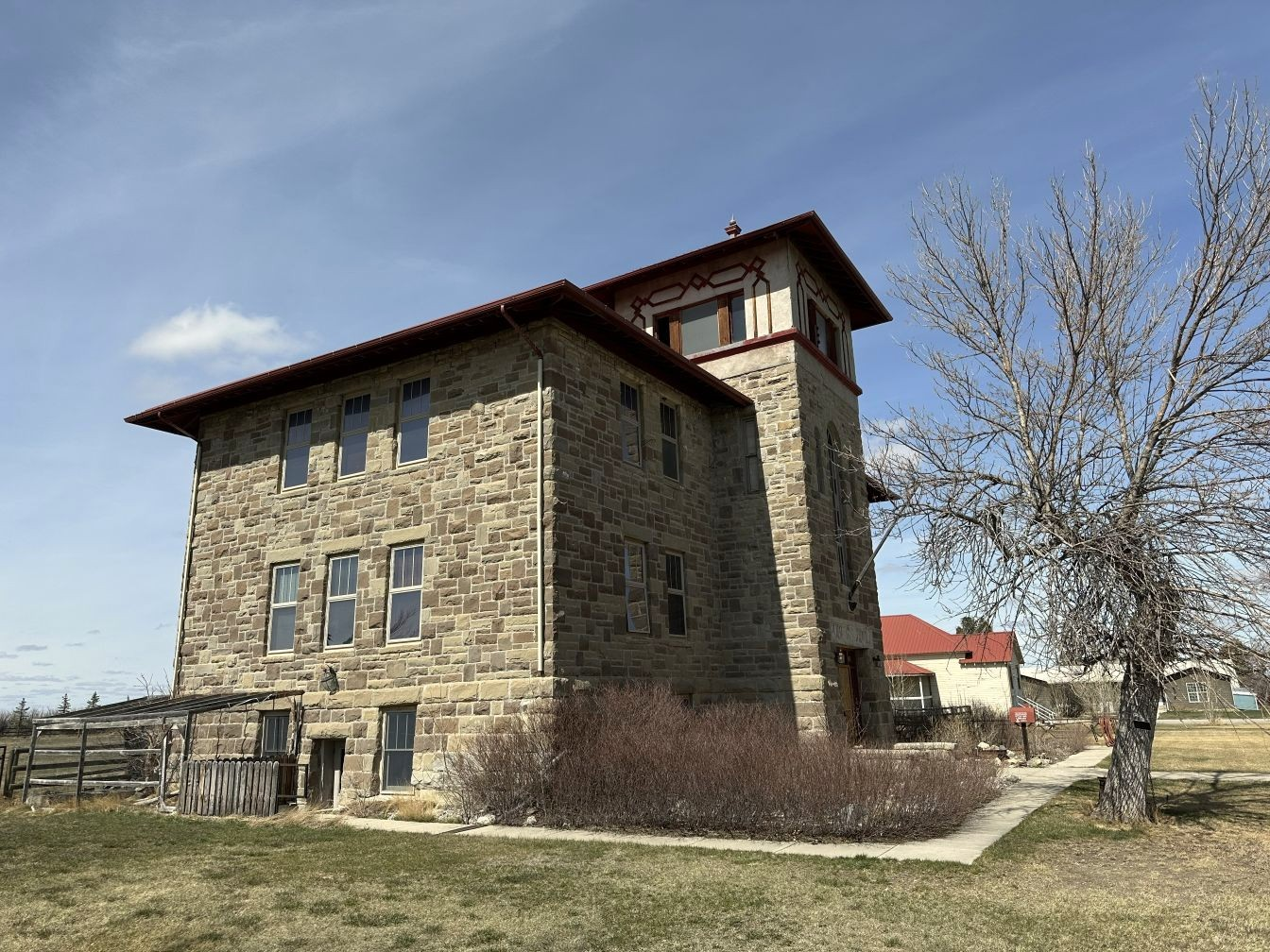
Valier Old School House, built 1911, listed on the National Register of Historic Places

Valier Public Schools educates students from kindergarten through 12th grade. The school district is made of these components: Valier Elementary School District and the Valier High School District.

Valier High School's team name is the Panthers.

Valier Public Library serves the area.

== Media ==
The local newspaper is The Valierian. It is published weekly both in print and as an e-edition.

== Infrastructure ==
Valier is on Highway 44, an east–west roadway that connects I-15 and US 89 at the midpoint between Glacier National Park and Great Falls. The local airport has a 3,000-foot (910 m) grass landing strip; also, water planes can land on the lake. It is a public use airport.

== Notable people ==
- Scott Curry American Football player, attended high school in Valier.
- Ivan Doig Author, graduated from Valier High School.
