= Conrad, Montana =

City in Montana, United States

Conrad
- City
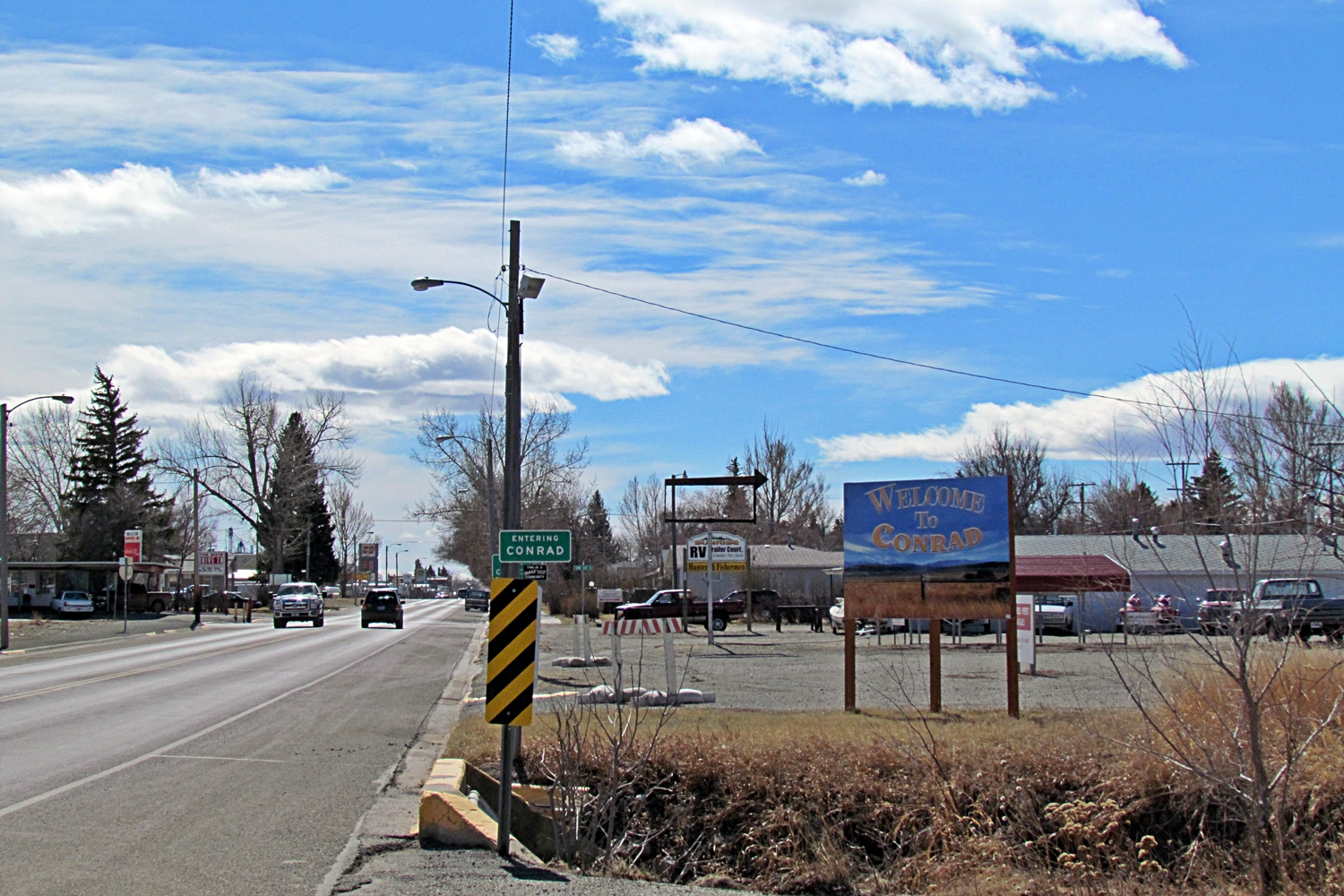
- Conrad, Montana
- Nickname: As Country as They Come
- Motto: "The Heart Of The Golden Triangle"
- Location of Conrad, Montana
- Coordinates: 48°10′27″N 111°56′48″W
- Country: United States
- State: Montana
- County: Pondera

Area
  - Total: 1.27 sq mi (3.29 km^{2})
  - Land: 1.27 sq mi (3.29 km^{2})
  - Water: 0 sq mi (0.00 km^{2})
- Elevation: 3,514 ft (1,071 m)

Population (2020)
  - Total: 2,318
  - Density: 1,823/sq mi (703.7/km^{2})
- Time zone: UTC-7 (Mountain (MST))
  - Summer (DST): UTC-6 (MDT)
- ZIP code: 59425
- Area code: 406
- FIPS code: 30-17275
- GNIS feature ID: 2410217
- Website: http://cityofconrad.com/

Conrad is a city in and the county seat of Pondera County, Montana, United States. The population was 2,318 at the 2020 census. Each June, the Whoop Up Days, a town wide celebration that includes a parade and rodeo, takes place in Conrad.

The town was incorporated in 1908.

== Geography ==
Interstate 15 passes through the community, with access from Exits 335 and 339.

According to the United States Census Bureau, the city has a total area of 1.25 square miles (3.24 km^{2}), all land.

Conrad is located one hour from the Rocky Mountain Front and within two hours of Glacier National Park.

=== Climate ===
Conrad experiences a semi-arid climate (Köppen BSk) with cold, dry winters and hot, wetter summers.

Climate data for Conrad, Montana (1991–2020 normals, extremes 1911–present)
Month	Jan	Feb	Mar	Apr	May	Jun	Jul	Aug	Sep	Oct	Nov	Dec	Year
Record high °F (°C)	65 (18)	72 (22)	79 (26)	88 (31)	93 (34)	101 (38)	103 (39)	105 (41)	100 (38)	91 (33)	82 (28)	72 (22)	105 (41)
Mean maximum °F (°C)	55.2 (12.9)	56.9 (13.8)	65.6 (18.7)	76.0 (24.4)	82.7 (28.2)	87.4 (30.8)	93.6 (34.2)	93.4 (34.1)	87.8 (31.0)	78.3 (25.7)	65.1 (18.4)	53.9 (12.2)	95.2 (35.1)
Mean daily maximum °F (°C)	34.2 (1.2)	36.8 (2.7)	46.1 (7.8)	56.6 (13.7)	66.1 (18.9)	73.2 (22.9)	82.4 (28.0)	81.7 (27.6)	71.3 (21.8)	57.2 (14.0)	43.1 (6.2)	34.3 (1.3)	56.9 (13.8)
Daily mean °F (°C)	22.6 (−5.2)	24.9 (−3.9)	33.3 (0.7)	43.0 (6.1)	52.4 (11.3)	59.8 (15.4)	67.0 (19.4)	65.6 (18.7)	56.4 (13.6)	44.0 (6.7)	31.8 (−0.1)	23.5 (−4.7)	43.7 (6.5)
Mean daily minimum °F (°C)	11.1 (−11.6)	12.9 (−10.6)	20.5 (−6.4)	29.5 (−1.4)	38.7 (3.7)	46.4 (8.0)	51.5 (10.8)	49.6 (9.8)	41.5 (5.3)	30.8 (−0.7)	20.4 (−6.4)	12.6 (−10.8)	30.5 (−0.8)
Mean minimum °F (°C)	−18.2 (−27.9)	−12.2 (−24.6)	−4.4 (−20.2)	12.6 (−10.8)	24.5 (−4.2)	34.6 (1.4)	41.0 (5.0)	38.3 (3.5)	27.2 (−2.7)	9.2 (−12.7)	−5.0 (−20.6)	−13.5 (−25.3)	−26.1 (−32.3)
Record low °F (°C)	−42 (−41)	−45 (−43)	−32 (−36)	−19 (−28)	9 (−13)	27 (−3)	30 (−1)	20 (−7)	0 (−18)	−16 (−27)	−32 (−36)	−46 (−43)	−46 (−43)
Average precipitation inches (mm)	0.44 (11)	0.45 (11)	0.56 (14)	1.48 (38)	2.08 (53)	2.59 (66)	1.07 (27)	0.99 (25)	1.07 (27)	0.81 (21)	0.64 (16)	0.44 (11)	12.62 (321)
Average snowfall inches (cm)	6.7 (17)	8.0 (20)	6.8 (17)	5.5 (14)	1.1 (2.8)	0.0 (0.0)	0.0 (0.0)	0.3 (0.76)	0.7 (1.8)	4.0 (10)	7.5 (19)	6.2 (16)	46.8 (119)
Average extreme snow depth inches (cm)	5.8 (15)	4.5 (11)	4.6 (12)	3.2 (8.1)	0.5 (1.3)	0.0 (0.0)	0.0 (0.0)	0.0 (0.0)	0.6 (1.5)	2.9 (7.4)	5.3 (13)	5.6 (14)	9.3 (24)
Average precipitation days (≥ 0.01 in)	4.6	5.4	5.0	6.7	8.9	10.1	6.1	6.5	5.8	5.1	5.0	4.6	73.8
Average snowy days (≥ 0.1 in)	4.5	4.8	3.6	2.1	0.4	0.0	0.0	0.1	0.2	1.5	3.7	4.2	25.1
Source: NOAA

== Demographics ==
Historical population
Census	Pop.	Note	%±
1910	888		—
1920	988		11.3%
1930	1,499		51.7%
1940	1,471		−1.9%
1950	1,865		26.8%
1960	2,665		42.9%
1970	2,770		3.9%
1980	3,074		11.0%
1990	2,891		−6.0%
2000	2,753		−4.8%
2010	2,570		−6.6%
2020	2,318		−9.8%
U.S. Decennial Census

=== 2020 census ===
As of the 2020 census, Conrad had a population of 2,318. The median age was 43.5 years. 21.4% of residents were under the age of 18 and 25.8% of residents were 65 years of age or older. For every 100 females there were 92.2 males, and for every 100 females age 18 and over there were 89.8 males age 18 and over.

0.0% of residents lived in urban areas, while 100.0% lived in rural areas.

There were 1,043 households in Conrad, of which 25.4% had children under the age of 18 living in them. Of all households, 42.9% were married-couple households, 20.5% were households with a male householder and no spouse or partner present, and 29.1% were households with a female householder and no spouse or partner present. About 38.4% of all households were made up of individuals and 18.5% had someone living alone who was 65 years of age or older.

There were 1,282 housing units, of which 18.6% were vacant. The homeowner vacancy rate was 4.1% and the rental vacancy rate was 15.9%.

Racial composition as of the 2020 census
Race	Number	Percent
White	2,126	91.7%
Black or African American	5	0.2%
American Indian and Alaska Native	38	1.6%
Asian	9	0.4%
Native Hawaiian and Other Pacific Islander	5	0.2%
Some other race	6	0.3%
Two or more races	129	5.6%
Hispanic or Latino (of any race)	50	2.2%

=== 2010 census ===
As of the census of 2010, there were 2,570 people, 1,113 households, and 676 families residing in the city. The population density was 2,056.0 inhabitants per square mile (793.8/km^{2}). There were 1,266 housing units at an average density of 1,012.8 units per square mile (391.0 units/km^{2}). The racial makeup of the city was 95.1% White, 0.2% African American, 1.8% Native American, 0.3% Asian, 0.2% from other races, and 2.4% from two or more races. Hispanic or Latino of any race were 1.5% of the population.

There were 1,113 households, of which 28.6% had children under the age of 18 living with them, 45.9% were married couples living together, 10.7% had a female householder with no husband present, 4.1% had a male householder with no wife present, and 39.3% were non-families. 35.1% of all households were made up of individuals, and 17.3% had someone living alone who was 65 years of age or older. The average household size was 2.19 and the average family size was 2.82.

The median age in the city was 45.7 years. 22.7% of residents were under the age of 18; 6.4% were between the ages of 18 and 24; 19.9% were from 25 to 44; 26.9% were from 45 to 64; and 24.2% were 65 years of age or older. The gender makeup of the city was 45.8% male and 54.2% female.

=== 2000 census ===
As of the census of 2000, there were 2,753 people, 1,154 households, and 755 families residing in the city. The population density was 2,338.5 inhabitants per square mile (902.9/km^{2}). There were 1,332 housing units at an average density of 1,131.5 units per square mile (436.9 units/km^{2}). The racial makeup of the city was 95.75% White, 0.11% African American, 2.29% Native American, 0.18% Asian, 0.11% Pacific Islander, 0.22% from other races, and 1.34% from two or more races. Hispanic or Latino of any race were 0.94% of the population.

There were 1,154 households, out of which 32.1% had children under the age of 18 living with them, 52.6% were married couples living together, 9.4% had a female householder with no husband present, and 34.5% were non-families. 31.3% of all households were made up of individuals, and 16.2% had someone living alone who was 65 years of age or older. The average household size was 2.33 and the average family size was 2.92.

In the city, the population was spread out, with 26.3% under the age of 18, 5.9% from 18 to 24, 25.7% from 25 to 44, 21.1% from 45 to 64, and 21.0% who were 65 years of age or older. The median age was 40 years. For every 100 females there were 87.9 males. For every 100 females age 18 and over, there were 85.0 males.

The median income for a household in the city was $29,432, and the median income for a family was $42,056. Males had a median income of $31,908 versus $19,286 for females. The per capita income for the city was $15,742. About 10.6% of families and 13.4% of the population were below the poverty line, including 15.3% of those under age 18 and 5.7% of those age 65 or over.

== Arts and culture ==
The Conrad Transportation and Historical Museum includes several replicas of the early town history.

== Government ==
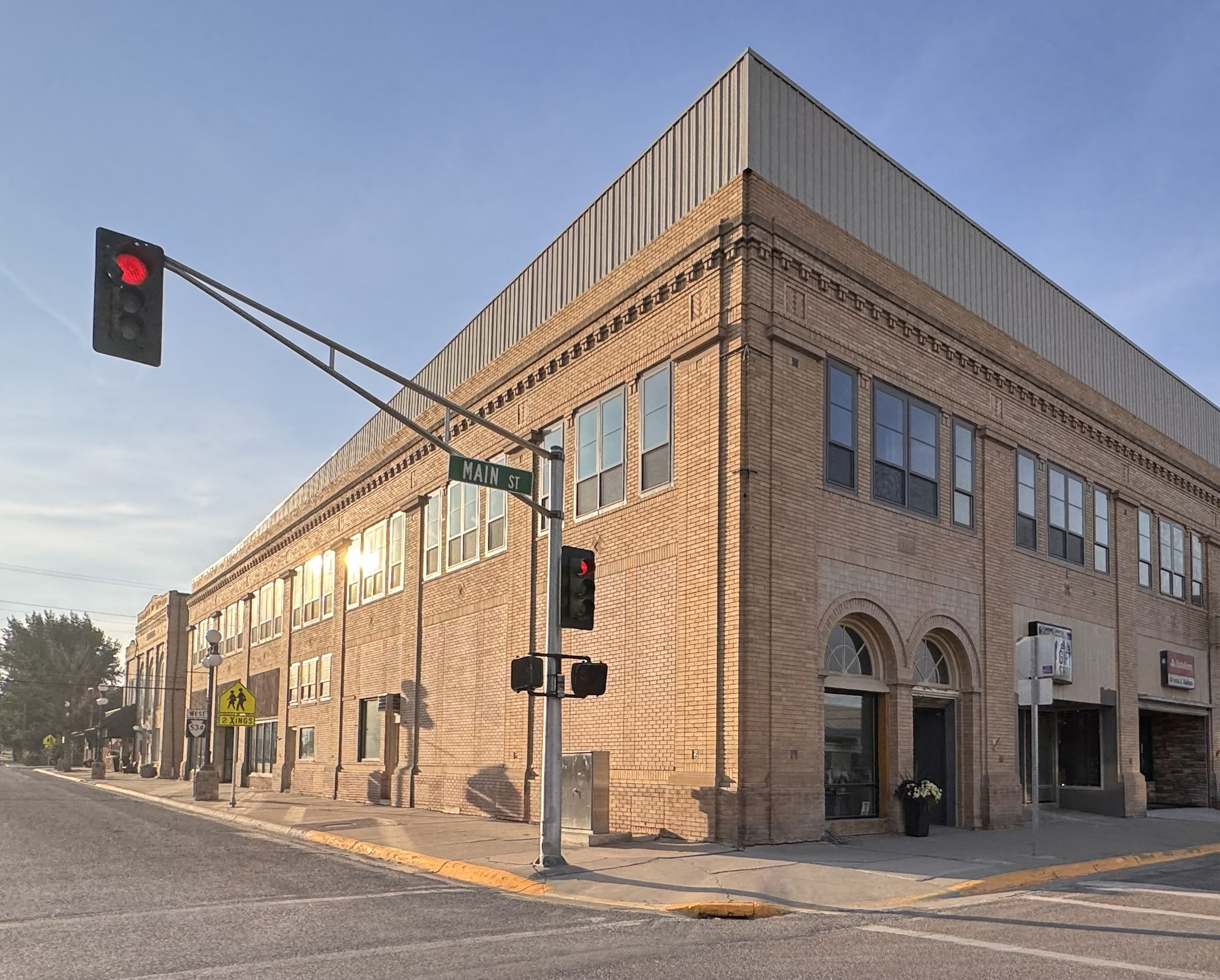
Downtown Conrad

Conrad operates under a Charter form of government. It has a mayor and four elected council members. Conrad City Hall, which is used as the public library, is listed on the National Register of Historic Places.

A. David Cates was elected mayor in November 2025. Cates replaced Jamie Miller who began her term in 2022. In November 2023 the city council voted unanimously to remove Miller from office. Council President Nathan Hunsucker then served as interim mayor. In January 2024 a judge voided the vote due to violating Montana right-to-know requirements. The Ninth District Court later ruled that the council could re-vote which resulted in Miller resigning in February 2024.

== Education ==
Conrad Public Schools educates students from kindergarten through 12th grade. The school system has two components: Conrad Elementary School District and Conrad High School District. Conrad High School's team name is the Cowboys/Cowgirls.

== Media ==
The weekly newspaper is The Independent-Observer. It is available as either a print or e-edition.

The radio station KHSI-LP, a religious teaching channel, is licensed in Conrad.

== Infrastructure ==
Conrad Airport is a public use airport located 1 mile west of town.

Logan Health operates a critical access care, rural clinic, and a health center in Conrad.

== Notable people ==
- LeRoy H. Anderson, U.S. representative from Montana
- Scott Curry, NFL offensive tackle
- Carol D'Onofrio, public health researcher
- Wylie Gustafson, country and western singer
- Llew Jones, Montana state legislator
- Kristen Juras, lieutenant governor of Montana
- Duncan McKenzie, convicted murderer
- Shannen Rossmiller, youngest female judge in United States history
