= Dupuyer, Montana =

- Census-designated place & Unincorporated community
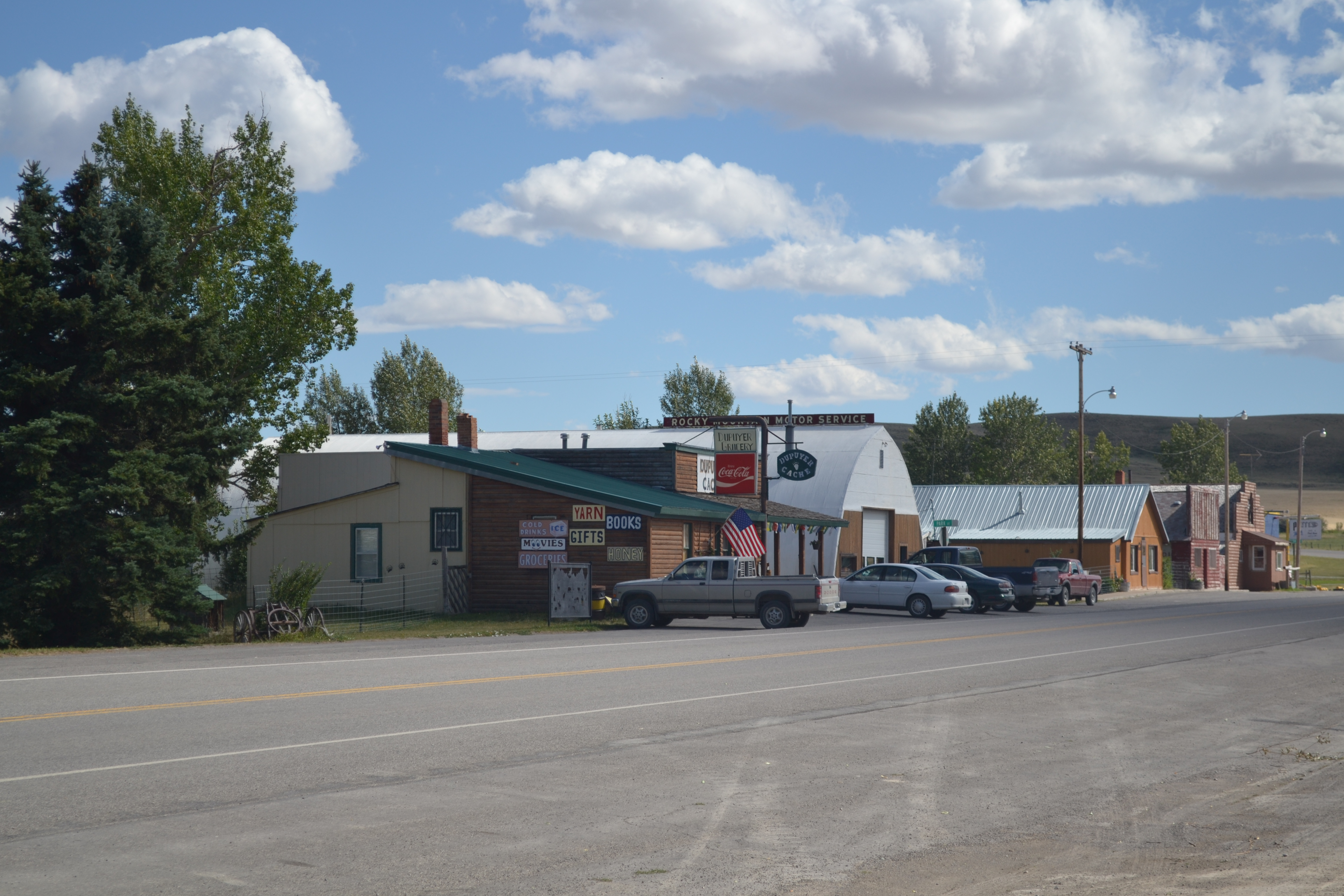

- Location within Montana Location within the United States
- Coordinates: 48°11′23″N 112°29′28″W
- Country: United States
- State: Montana
- County: Pondera

Area
  - Total: 4.65 sq mi (12.05 km^{2})
  - Land: 4.65 sq mi (12.04 km^{2})
  - Water: 0.0039 sq mi (0.01 km^{2})
- Elevation: 4,177 ft (1,273 m)

Population (2020)
  - Total: 93
  - Density: 20.0/sq mi (7.73/km^{2})
- Time zone: UTC-7 (Mountain (MST))
  - Summer (DST): UTC-6 (MDT)
- ZIP code: 59432
- Area code: 406
- GNIS feature ID: 2583804

Dupuyer (/dəˈpuːjər/) is a census-designated place and unincorporated community in Pondera County, Montana, United States. As of the 2020 census, Dupuyer had a population of 93. The community is located along U.S. Route 89 and Dupuyer Creek. Dupuyer has a post office with ZIP code 59432.

The community takes its name from Dupuyer Creek, which borders the town. It began as a stagecoach stop in 1877 on the Fort Benton–Fort Browning road.

== Geography ==
=== Climate ===
According to the Köppen Climate Classification system, Dupuyer has a semi-arid climate, abbreviated "BSk" on climate maps.

== Demographics ==
Historical population
Census	Pop.	Note	%±
2020	93		—
U.S. Decennial Census

== Education ==
It is in the Dupuyer Elementary School District and the Valier High School District.
