= Pondera County, Montana =

County in Montana, United States

- County
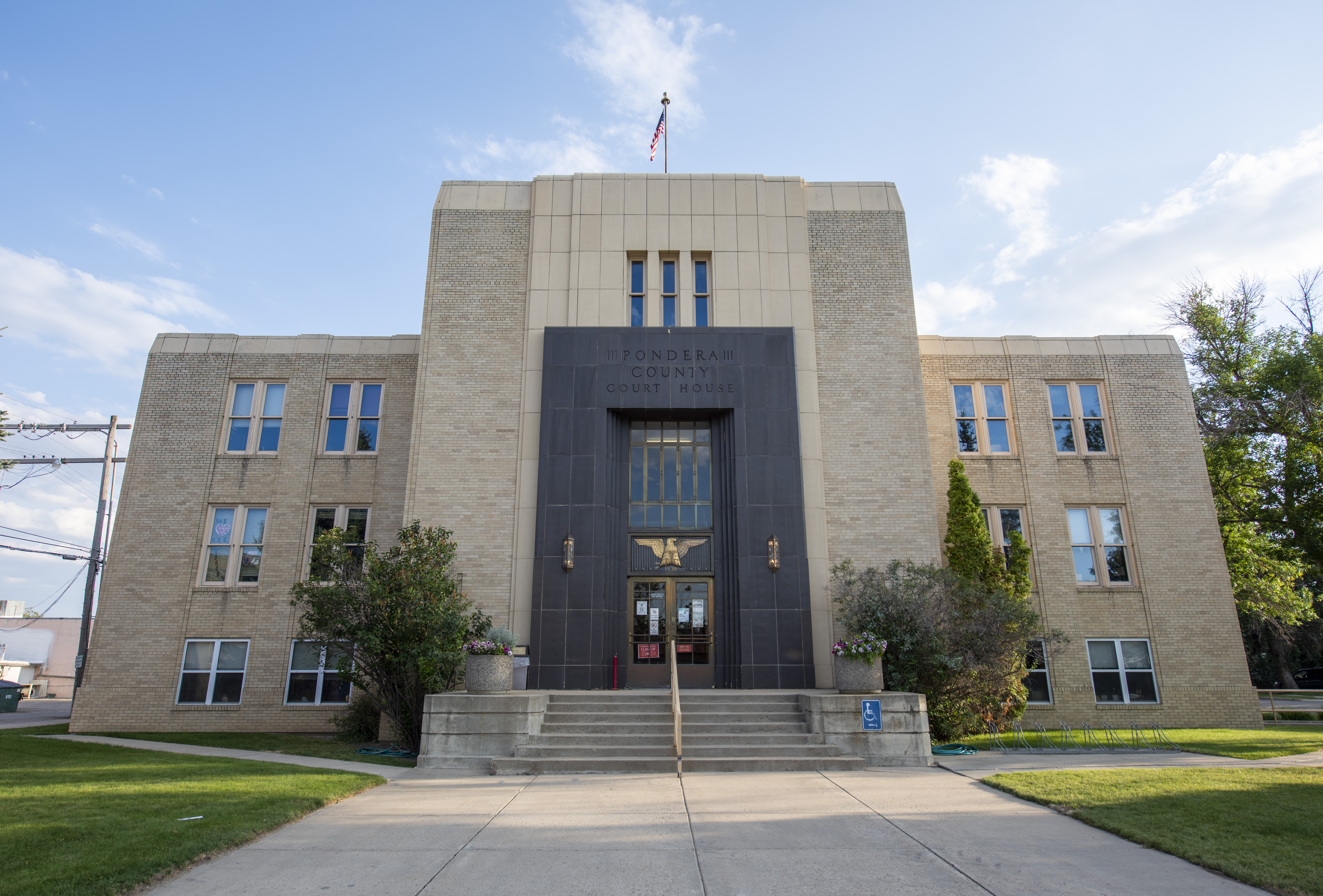
- Pondera County Courthouse

- Location within the U.S. state of Montana
- Coordinates: 48°14′N 112°13′W
- Country: United States
- State: Montana
- Founded: April 1, 1919
- Named for: Pend d'Oreilles people
- Seat: Conrad
- Largest city: Conrad

Area
  - Total: 1,640 sq mi (4,200 km^{2})
  - Land: 1,623 sq mi (4,200 km^{2})
  - Water: 17 sq mi (44 km^{2}) 1.0%

Population (2020)
  - Total: 5,898
  - Estimate (2025): 6,072 ▲
  - Density: 3.7/sq mi (1.4/km^{2})
- Time zone: UTC−7 (Mountain)
  - Summer (DST): UTC−6 (MDT)
- Congressional districts: 1st, 2nd
- Website: www.ponderacountymt.gov
- Montana county number 26

Pondera County (/ˌpɒndəˈreɪ/ POND-ə-RAY) is a county in the U.S. state of Montana. As of the 2020 census, the population was 5,898. Its county seat is Conrad.

== Geography ==
According to the United States Census Bureau, the county has a total area of 1,640 square miles (4,200 km^{2}), of which 1,623 square miles (4,200 km^{2}) is land and 17 square miles (44 km^{2}) (1.0%) is water.

=== National protected area ===
- Lewis and Clark National Forest (part)
- Rocky Mountain Front Conservation Area (part)

== Demographics ==
Historical population
Census	Pop.	Note	%±
1920	5,741		—
1930	6,964		21.3%
1940	6,716		−3.6%
1950	6,392		−4.8%
1960	7,653		19.7%
1970	6,611		−13.6%
1980	6,731		1.8%
1990	6,433		−4.4%
2000	6,424		−0.1%
2010	6,153		−4.2%
2020	5,898		−4.1%
2025 (est.)	6,072	▲	3.0%
U.S. Decennial Census:

=== 2020 census ===
As of the 2020 census, the county had a population of 5,898. Of the residents, 24.4% were under the age of 18 and 22.4% were 65 years of age or older; the median age was 42.1 years. For every 100 females there were 99.3 males, and for every 100 females age 18 and over there were 96.4 males. 0.0% of residents lived in urban areas and 100.0% lived in rural areas.

The racial makeup of the county was 79.3% White, 0.1% Black or African American, 15.4% American Indian and Alaska Native, 0.4% Asian, 0.3% from some other race, and 4.4% from two or more races. Hispanic or Latino residents of any race comprised 1.6% of the population.

There were 2,254 households in the county, of which 28.2% had children under the age of 18 living with them and 23.9% had a female householder with no spouse or partner present. About 31.2% of all households were made up of individuals and 15.8% had someone living alone who was 65 years of age or older.

There were 2,759 housing units, of which 18.3% were vacant. Among occupied housing units, 66.5% were owner-occupied and 33.5% were renter-occupied. The homeowner vacancy rate was 2.8% and the rental vacancy rate was 10.4%.

=== 2010 census ===
As of the 2010 census, there were 6,153 people, 2,285 households, and 1,528 families residing in the county. The population density was 3.8 inhabitants per square mile (1.5/km^{2}). There were 2,659 housing units at an average density of 1.6 units per square mile (0.62 units/km^{2}). The racial makeup of the county was 82.7% white, 14.5% American Indian, 0.2% Asian, 0.1% black or African American, 0.2% from other races, and 2.4% from two or more races. Those of Hispanic or Latino origin made up 1.4% of the population. In terms of ancestry, 31.9% were German, 14.7% were Norwegian, 13.2% were Irish, 9.3% were English, 5.7% were Dutch, and 5.6% were American.

Of the 2,285 households, 30.0% had children under the age of 18 living with them, 53.3% were married couples living together, 9.4% had a female householder with no husband present, 33.1% were non-families, and 29.9% of all households were made up of individuals. The average household size was 2.41 and the average family size was 3.01. The median age was 42.8 years.

The median income for a household in the county was $36,419 and the median income for a family was $47,656. Males had a median income of $34,259 versus $26,903 for females. The per capita income for the county was $18,989. About 14.9% of families and 21.5% of the population were below the poverty line, including 32.5% of those under age 18 and 10.7% of those age 65 or over.

== Politics ==
From its creation until 1964, voters of Pondera County were fairly balanced; they selected Democratic Party candidates in 58% of national elections. Since 1964, the Republican presidential candidate has garnered the county's vote in every election. The eastern part of the county reaches into the Blackfeet Reservation, which votes strongly Democratic; otherwise the county is strongly Republican-leaning. A Republican trend on the Reservation in 2024, which also occurred in neighboring Glacier County and other majority Native American counties in Montana, led to Donald Trump performing better than any other Republican in county history that year.

United States presidential election results for Pondera County, Montana
Year	Republican		Democratic		Third party(ies)	
Year	No.	%	No.	%	No.	%
1920	1,654	62.49%	893	33.74%	100	3.78%
1924	764	37.67%	414	20.41%	850	41.91%
1928	1,324	57.99%	944	41.35%	15	0.66%
1932	930	32.35%	1,805	62.78%	140	4.87%
1936	658	22.43%	2,213	75.43%	63	2.15%
1940	1,038	34.83%	1,899	63.72%	43	1.44%
1944	890	37.70%	1,448	61.33%	23	0.97%
1948	902	35.37%	1,555	60.98%	93	3.65%
1952	1,719	57.45%	1,246	41.64%	27	0.90%
1956	1,651	53.45%	1,438	46.55%	0	0.00%
1960	1,452	46.76%	1,653	53.24%	0	0.00%
1964	1,110	38.58%	1,759	61.14%	8	0.28%
1968	1,530	52.98%	1,149	39.79%	209	7.24%
1972	1,890	57.41%	1,215	36.91%	187	5.68%
1976	1,666	52.89%	1,413	44.86%	71	2.25%
1980	2,270	66.14%	897	26.14%	265	7.72%
1984	2,239	67.52%	1,039	31.33%	38	1.15%
1988	1,795	57.64%	1,245	39.98%	74	2.38%
1992	1,252	39.56%	1,046	33.05%	867	27.39%
1996	1,438	48.53%	1,123	37.90%	402	13.57%
2000	1,948	67.27%	792	27.35%	156	5.39%
2004	1,853	64.79%	956	33.43%	51	1.78%
2008	1,588	55.04%	1,223	42.39%	74	2.56%
2012	1,673	61.53%	975	35.86%	71	2.61%
2016	1,799	66.07%	738	27.10%	186	6.83%
2020	2,031	67.81%	903	30.15%	61	2.04%
2024	1,972	69.14%	782	27.42%	98	3.44%

== Communities ==
=== City ===
- Conrad (county seat)

=== Town ===
- Valier

=== Census-designated places ===
- Birch Creek Colony
- Brady
- Dupuyer
- Heart Butte
- Kingsbury Colony
- Midway Colony
- New Miami Colony
- Pondera Colony

=== Other unincorporated communities ===
- East Community
- Fowler
- Gallup City
- Ledger
- Manson
- Williams

== Education ==
K-12 school districts include:

- Dutton/Brady Public School District
- Heart Butte K-12 Schools

High school districts include:

- Conrad High School District
- Valier High School District

Elementary school districts include:

- Conrad Elementary School District
- Dupuyer Elementary School District
- Miami Elementary School District
- Valier Elementary School District

== Notable people ==
- Ivan Doig, author; resided in Dupuyer
- George Montgomery – film/television actor; born and raised in Brady

== See also ==
- List of lakes in Pondera County, Montana
- List of mountains in Pondera County, Montana
- National Register of Historic Places listings in Pondera County MT
