= Tornado outbreak of November 22–24, 2004 =

Weather event in the United States

Meteorological history
- Formed: November 22, 2004
- Dissipated: November 24, 2004

Tornado outbreak
- Tornadoes: 104
- Max. rating: F3 tornado
- Duration: ~3 Days, 16 hours
- Lowest pressure: 997 hPa (mbar); 29.44 inHg

Overall effects
- Fatalities: 4
- Injuries: 39
- Damage: $34.265 million (2004 USD)
- Areas affected: Southern United States
- Part of Tornadoes of 2004

A record-breaking large and destructive tornado outbreak impacted the Southern United States at the end of November 2004. The outbreak started with numerous weak tornadoes from Central Texas through Louisiana from November 22 through the afternoon of November 23 before more significant tornadoes occurred through November 24. Over a dozen intense tornadoes touched down, including four deadly tornadoes in Texas, Louisiana, Mississippi, and Alabama. Overall, 104 tornadoes were confirmed, tying the 1981 United Kingdom tornado outbreak record for largest tornado outbreak in November.

== Meteorological synopsis ==
In November and December 2004, the prevailing pattern was conducive for severe weather across the Southern United States, with a large ridge over the northern Pacific Ocean supporting a southerly storm track toward the Gulf Coast. The fall season contributed to an already active year, solidifying 2004 as the busiest year for tornadoes on record in the United States.

This particular tornado outbreak began on November 22 as a potent cold-core low over Southern California began to move eastward toward Texas, where the Storm Prediction Center (SPC) issued a Slight risk of severe weather. At the surface, a warm front became increasingly defined stretching from Central Louisiana westward through Central Texas. To the south of this boundary, a weakening capping inversion, dewpoints reaching the lower 70s °F, and mixed layer convective available potential energy upwards of 1,500 J/kg indicated an environment supportive of damaging winds and isolated tornadoes. Series of strong to severe thunderstorms developed along this boundary, including a persistent supercell near the Houston metropolitan area. Low-level wind shear was locally enhanced along this front, allowing the storms to produce brief tornadoes as they interacted with it throughout the afternoon.

On November 23, the cold-core low and associated mid- to upper-level winds of 90 kn (105 mph; 165 km/h) shifted eastward from the Texas Panhandle toward the Mississippi River Valley. With a low-pressure area forming over North Texas and advancing toward Arkansas, the warm front began the day just inland from the northwestern Gulf Coast but soon began to lift northward. South of this boundary, MLCAPE values of 2,000-2,500 J/kg were prevalent, while initially weak shear profiles improved as the upper-level disturbance approached from the west. By the afternoon hours, tornadic supercells developed north of I-10 before spreading eastward into Louisiana and Mississippi with time. Trailing this activity, an intense squall line developed across coastal sections of Texas and progressed eastward with increasing damaging wind potential. Even as this line overtook previously discrete supercells, additional ones developed across Mississippi and Alabama through the morning hours. Finally, as convection spread eastward into Georgia and the Carolinas, the combination of continued strong shear but marginal instability caused the event to transition to more of a damaging wind episode.

Complimenting the Moderate risk that shifted eastward into Alabama, Georgia, and the Florida Panhandle early on November 24, the SPC issued another Moderate risk for a secondary threat of severe weather farther north. Here, the deepening surface low supported an arced warm front across Indiana, Ohio, and Kentucky. In the presence of strong wind shear and MLCAPE values of 500-800 J/kg, bands of convection developed across the region, particularly focused along a pre-frontal trough. Tornadic supercells tracked across southeastern Indiana toward the Ohio border over ensuing hours. By the evening, these storms were undercut by a surging cold front, and loss of daytime heating eroded the instability necessary for severe storms to continue.

== Confirmed tornadoes ==
Confirmed tornadoes by Fujita rating
FU	F0	F1	F2	F3	F4	F5	Total
0	61	25	15	3	0	0	104

=== November 22 event ===
List of confirmed tornadoes – Monday, November 22, 2004 (Note: All dates are based on the local time zone where the tornado touched down; however, all times are in Coordinated Universal Time for consistency.)
F#	Location	County / Parish	State	Start Coord.	Time (UTC)	Path length	Max width	Summary
F0	Pasadena	Harris	TX	29.7°N 95.2°W	18:30	0.1 mi (0.16 km)	20 yd (18 m)	A power pole was downed.
F0	Iowa	Calcasieu	LA	30.2333°N 93.0167°W	19:30–19:35	1 mi (1.6 km)	10 yd (9.1 m)	A small, narrow tornado touched down briefly, destroying a brick dugout, damaging a shed, a porch, and a trampoline at nearby buildings.
F0	SW of Fenton	Jefferson Davis	LA	30.3167°N 92.95°W	20:05	1 mi (1.6 km)	10 yd (9.1 m)	Two doors and a roof were ripped off a home near Woodlawn.
F0	Jersey Village	Harris	TX	29.8833°N 95.5667°W	20:42	0.2 mi (0.32 km)	20 yd (18 m)	A trained storm spotter reported a brief tornado.
F0	Houston	Harris	TX	29.7333°N 95.3667°W	21:53	0.5 mi (0.80 km)	25 yd (23 m)	Local residents reported a tornado.
F0	NW of Iota	Acadia	LA	30.45°N 92.6167°W	22:42	1 mi (1.6 km)	10 yd (9.1 m)	A roof was blown off of a tin building.

=== November 23 event ===
List of confirmed tornadoes – Tuesday, November 23, 2004
F#	Location	County / Parish	State	Start Coord.	Time (UTC)	Path length	Max width	Summary
F0	NW of Taylor	Williamson	TX	30.5833°N 97.4333°W	16:40–16:41	0.1 mi (0.16 km)	20 yd (18 m)	A member of the public reported a brief tornado; it did not cause damage.
F0	NW of Round Rock	Williamson	TX	30.5333°N 97.7167°W	16:51–16:52	0.1 mi (0.16 km)	20 yd (18 m)	Members of the publics reported another brief tornado; it did not cause damage.
F0	SSW of Jonah	Williamson	TX	30.6167°N 97.55°W	17:05–17:06	0.3 mi (0.48 km)	30 yd (27 m)	An amateur radio spotter reported a small tornado.
F0	E of Cut and Shoot	Montgomery	TX	30.3333°N 95.3333°W	19:10	0.2 mi (0.32 km)	20 yd (18 m)	Roof damage occurred to a flea market and several nearby homes.
F0	La Grange	Fayette	TX	29.9°N 96.8667°W	19:34–19:36	0.3 mi (0.48 km)	30 yd (27 m)	A small structure was knocked over, and several cars and buildings sustained damage.
F0	Lake Livingston	Polk	TX	30.6333°N 95°W	19:49	0.1 mi (0.16 km)	15 yd (14 m)	A waterspout came ashore from Lake Livingston, crossing over the Lake Livingston Dam.
F0	S of West Livingston	San Jacinto	TX	30.65°N 95.0°W	19:55	0.1 mi (0.16 km)	20 yd (18 m)	A tornado was spotted north of Lake Livingston Dam.
F0	Brenham	Washington	TX	30.1667°N 96.4°W	20:20	0.1 mi (0.16 km)	20 yd (18 m)	A tornado downed trees, along with residential and vehicle damage.
F0	ESE of Stilson	Liberty	TX	30.0°N 94.8833°W	20:52	0.1 mi (0.16 km)	20 yd (18 m)	The public reported a brief tornado over open land; it did not cause damage.
F0	Todd Mission	Grimes	TX	30.2667°N 95.8333°W	21:25	0.2 mi (0.32 km)	25 yd (23 m)	Law enforcement reported a brief tornado over open land; it did not cause damage.
F0	N of Montgomery	Montgomery	TX	30.4°N 95.6833°W	21:30	0.3 mi (0.48 km)	25 yd (23 m)	A couple of trees were downed.
F0	N of Elm Creek	Maverick	TX	28.9333°N 100.5°W	21:35–21:36	0.1 mi (0.16 km)	20 yd (18 m)	Deputies with the Maverick County Sheriff's Department reported a small and brief tornado in open country.
F0	Willis	Montgomery	TX	30.4167°N 95.4833°W	21:50	0.1 mi (0.16 km)	20 yd (18 m)	A tree was downed onto a road.
F1	NE of Honey Island to SSE of Fred	Hardin	TX	30.4°N 94.4333°W	22:08–22:28	16 mi (26 km)	200 yd (180 m)	Many trees were downed, of which several fell on homes.
F0	W of Portland	Chicot	AR	33.2333°N 91.4°W	22:10–22:12	1 mi (1.6 km)	50 yd (46 m)	A tornado downed power lines.
F0	S of Start	Richland	LA	32.1167°N 91.3°W	22:24–22:25	0.5 mi (0.80 km)	25 yd (23 m)	A trained spotter spotted a weak tornado as it moved briefly across an open field.
F2	S of Fred	Hardin, Tyler, Jasper	TX	30.4833°N 94.1667°W	22:27–22:50	16 mi (26 km)	600 yd (550 m)	1 death – A 75-year-old woman was killed when several trees smashed a mobile home. Between 10 and 20 homes were also damaged or destroyed.
F0	WNW of La Pryor	Zavala	TX	28.95°N 99.9333°W	22:38–22:39	0.1 mi (0.16 km)	20 yd (18 m)	Deputies from the Zavala County Sheriff's Department observed a brief, small tornado over open country; it did not cause damage.
F0	NE of Elm Creek (1st tornado)	Maverick	TX	28.9°N 100.2833°W	22:40–22:41	0.3 mi (0.48 km)	30 yd (27 m)	Deputies from the Maverick County Sheriff's Department observed a brief, small tornado over open country; it did not cause damage.
F2	W of Kirbyville to SSE of Newton	Jasper, Newton	TX	30.65°N 94.0°W	22:55–23:15	15 mi (24 km)	500 yd (460 m)	A tornado damaged or destroyed 10-15 homes in Bon Ami and another 5-10 homes in Pine Grove. Many trees were downed.
F0	NE of Elm Creek (2nd tornado)	Maverick	TX	28.9167°N 100.2667°W	23:12–23:14	0.5 mi (0.80 km)	50 yd (46 m)	A second tornado was spotted near Elm Creek.
F1	NE of Bon Wier	Newton	TX	30.7833°N 93.7333°W	23:12–23:20	3 mi (4.8 km)	300 yd (270 m)	A tornado damaged several homes before dissipating near a high school.
F1	SE of Burkeville, TX to Evans, LA	Newton (TX), Vernon (LA)	TX, LA	30.9667°N 93.5833°W	23:40–23:50	9 mi (14 km)	300 yd (270 m)	A tornado damaged or destroyed several homes near Evans. Trees and power lines were knocked down.
F0	WSW of Natchez	Natchitoches	LA	31.6667°N 93.0667°W	00:00–00:05	1 mi (1.6 km)	25 yd (23 m)	A weak tornado caused some isolated, minimal damage to structures in Natchez.
F0	SE of Bertram	Burnet	TX	30.7167°N 98.0167°W	00:08–00:09	0.1 mi (0.16 km)	20 yd (18 m)	Deputies from the Burnet County Sheriff's Department reported a brief tornado; it did not cause damage.
F1	Leesville	Vernon	LA	31.15°N 93.2667°W	00:08–00:09	1 mi (1.6 km)	100 yd (91 m)	A tornado touched down in a subdivision in Leesville, damaging several homes.
F0	W of Jarrell	Williamson	TX	30.8167°N 97.6°W	00:08–00:10	0.3 mi (0.48 km)	400 yd (370 m)	Minor vegetation damage occurred.
F1	WSW of Jamestown	Jasper, Newton	TX	30.8833°N 93.8833°W	00:10–00:13	2 mi (3.2 km)	100 yd (91 m)	Trees and power lines were reportedly blown down.
F1	Burkeville	Newton	TX	30.9667°N 93.6833°W	00:30–00:43	10 mi (16 km)	300 yd (270 m)	Between 5-10 homes were destroyed. Many trees and power lines were downed.
F2	NW of Simpson	Vernon	LA	31.3167°N 93.0667°W	00:35–00:42	10 mi (16 km)	600 yd (550 m)	A tornado struck the town of Hutton, damaging about 15 houses and injuring 3 people.
F2	S of Mora to SW of Chopin	Natchitoches	LA	31.3333°N 92.95°W	00:49–01:20	20 mi (32 km)	300 yd (270 m)	Extensive tree damage occurred, along with minor damage to farm outbuildings. Many other trees were either snapped or uprooted on a stretch of over two miles. Several homes sustained moderate to major damage, including two frame homes were destroyed. Two mobile homes were also destroyed, and one woman suffered broken ribs and a punctured lung.
F1	Burr Ferry to SW of Leesville	Vernon	LA	31.0667°N 93.5°W	00:50–01:05	14 mi (23 km)	150 yd (140 m)	A tornado tore down many trees, power lines, and damaged several homes near the southwestern side of Anacoco Lake.
F1	Fort Polk South	Vernon	LA	31.05°N 93.2°W	01:20–01:25	3 mi (4.8 km)	50 yd (46 m)	A small tornado downed trees.
F0	N of Colfax to Williana	Grant	LA	31.5667°N 92.7167°W	01:20–02:00	12 mi (19 km)	75 yd (69 m)	A small tornado downed trees.
F0	NW of Davilla	Bell	TX	30.8667°N 96.6°W	01:32	0.1 mi (0.16 km)	50 yd (46 m)	A house and a building were damaged.
F0	Kenedy	Karnes	TX	28.8167°N 97.85°W	01:46–01:47	0.1 mi (0.16 km)	20 yd (18 m)	The Karnes County Sheriff's Department reported a brief tornado in an open area; it did not cause damage.
F0	Yorktown	De Witt	TX	28.9833°N 97.5°W	02:00–02:01	0.1 mi (0.16 km)	20 yd (18 m)	Amateur radio operators reported a brief tornado in open country; it did not cause damage.
F3	SW of Olla to E of Copenhagen	La Salle, Caldwell	LA	31.8833°N 92.25°W	02:05–02:30	15 mi (24 km)	300 yd (270 m)	1 death – A high school sustained significant roof damage consistent with an F2 tornado. The damage path extended into the middle of Olla where numerous homes sustained severe damage. Some homes lost the roof, exterior walls, and a few interior walls. Across the northeast part of town, five mobile homes were completely destroyed and a pickup was launched 200 feet (61 m) and smashed upside down. In the community of Standard, four homes and a store were destroyed. Total damage consisted of minor to major damage to 106 homes and the high school. The tornado continued into Caldwell Parish, where numerous trees were blown over and snapped off at the parish line. The tornado then tracked northeast to the community of Spaulding where a few homes sustained roof damage. Three miles northeast of Spaulding, hundreds of trees were snapped off in a ravine. In Holum, several homes were heavily damaged, including a home that was unroofed, warranting an F2 rating. Before lifting, numerous trees were snapped and a home sustained roof damage near Copenhagen. Twenty people were injured.
F1	N of Cuero	De Witt	TX	29.15°N 97.2833°W	02:13–02:15	0.5 mi (0.80 km)	100 yd (91 m)	Two mobile homes were destroyed.
F0	NNE of Rapides	Grant	LA	31.3833°N 92.5667°W	02:30–02:50	3 mi (4.8 km)	75 yd (69 m)	Damage occurred to trees and a home that was still under construction, which collapsed.
F0	Sublime	Lavaca	TX	29.4833°N 96.8°W	02:58–02:59	0.1 mi (0.16 km)	20 yd (18 m)	The Lavaca County Sheriff's Department reported a brief tornado over open country; it did not cause damage.
F0	NE of Glen Flora	Wharton	TX	29.3667°N 96.1667°W	03:20	0.4 mi (0.64 km)	35 yd (32 m)	Four homes were damaged.
F1	SE of Detroit to SE of Hamilton	Lamar, Marion	AL	34.0167°N 88.15°W	03:38–04:02	13.9 mi (22.4 km)	250 yd (230 m)	Numerous outbuildings were damaged or destroyed, and three grain silos were damaged. One of the silos was tossed over 200 yards (180 m) from where it was anchored. Several manufactured homes and residential houses sustained varying levels of damage, some of which were rendered uninhabitable. Hundreds of trees and power lines were snapped or downed.
F2	SE of Apple Springs	Trinity	TX	31.1667°N 94.8833°W	04:00	2 mi (3.2 km)	500 yd (460 m)	A strong tornado occurred in Davy Crockett National Forest, stranding seven hunters and severely damaging their vehicles. Along its path, 70-90 percent of trees were downed or damaged.
F0	W of Pecan Grove	Fort Bend	TX	29.6167°N 95.7667°W	04:05	0.1 mi (0.16 km)	20 yd (18 m)	A tree was downed.
F0	SSE of Beechwood	Warren	MS	32.2667°N 90.7833°W	05:31–05:33	1 mi (1.6 km)	75 yd (69 m)	A few large trees were downed, and branches were snapped off about a dozen more.
F3	E of Church Hill to WSW of Pattison	Jefferson, Claiborne	MS	31.7167°N 91.2°W	05:40–06:05	18.5 mi (29.8 km)	600 yd (550 m)	A large and intense tornado caused damage to countless trees. At one point, it snapped or uprooted every tree in a forest, consistent with F3 damage. A large tractor shed, with a frame made of large I-beams, was completely destroyed; the beams were snapped from their base as the structure blew away. One residential house lost nearly its entire roof and had every window blown out. One mobile home and two sheds sustained minor damage. A string of seven power poles were snapped.

=== November 24 event ===
List of confirmed tornadoes – Wednesday, November 24, 2004
F#	Location	County / Parish	State	Start Coord.	Time (UTC)	Path length	Max width	Summary
F2	NW of Slidell	St. Tammany	LA	30.3°N 89.85°W	06:30–06:45	4 mi (6.4 km)	50 yd (46 m)	A tornado damaged 152 homes near Slidell, with 9 of the homes being declared uninhabitable. Four people sustained injuries.
F0	SE of Utica	Copiah, Hinds	MS	32.0667°N 90.6°W	06:33–06:34	1 mi (1.6 km)	30 yd (27 m)	A few trees were damaged.
F0	Northwestern Madison	Madison	MS	32.4833°N 90.1667°W	06:35–06:45	6 mi (9.7 km)	40 yd (37 m)	Scattered trees were toppled or snapped.
F2	S of Georgetown to N of Magee	Lawrence, Simpson	MS	31.75°N 90.1167°W	06:54–07:36	28 mi (45 km)	200 yd (180 m)	Several hundred trees were snapped or uprooted. Several chicken houses sustained major damage, including a few that were completely destroyed. Three homes sustained major damage, and nine mobile homes sustained major damage. A Veterans of Foreign Wars building sustained severe damage, and an RV was rolled.
F2	NW of Ludlow to E of Good Hope	Scott, Leake	MS	32.6°N 89.75°W	07:15–07:28	10.5 mi (16.9 km)	400 yd (370 m)	This strong tornado damaged hundreds of homes. Four mobile homes had pieces of their siding torn off and small parts of their roofs peeled back. Two residential homes sustained significant roof damage, and a third home was destroyed by fallen trees. A chicken house was severely damaged, and three farm buildings were destroyed as well.
F1	SW of Oak Vale	Lawrence	MS	31.3667°N 90.0833°W	07:32–07:43	7 mi (11 km)	75 yd (69 m)	A few hundred trees were snapped or uprooted.
F1	NE of Walnut Grove	Leake	MS	32.65°N 89.4°W	07:43–07:48	3 mi (4.8 km)	75 yd (69 m)	Numerous trees were snapped or uprooted, and one home was severely damaged by two fallen trees. A chicken house had a large portion of its roof ripped off and scattered for 0.25 miles (0.40 km).
F2	S of Raleigh to Montrose to SE of Hickory	Smith, Jasper, Newton	MS	32.0167°N 89.5333°W	07:53–08:39	38 mi (61 km)	600 yd (550 m)	A long-tracked and strong tornado destroyed and uprooted a few thousand trees. It likewise destroyed 21 chicken houses, 3 mobile homes, and 1 residential home. Another 11 chicken houses and 23 homes sustained damage. Two people were injured in a destroyed mobile home.
F0	W of Wiggins	Stone	MS	30.85°N 89.1333°W	08:10–08:12	0.3 mi (0.48 km)	30 yd (27 m)	A brief tornado downed trees.
F1	SE of Stallo	Neshoba	MS	32.9°N 89.0833°W	08:19–08:26	4 mi (6.4 km)	100 yd (91 m)	A few hundred trees were toppled, and an abandoned house was destroyed by fallen trees. Power lines were downed as well.
F3	SE of Stallo to SW of Macon	Neshoba, Winston, Noxubee	MS	32.9167°N 89.0°W	08:25–08:51	21 mi (34 km)	600 yd (550 m)	1 death – A long-tracked, significant tornado destroyed four large chicken houses and a residential home. Pieces of the house were scattered for 0.25 miles (0.40 km), and three vehicles at the location were moved. One death and two injuries occurred in the house. Thousands of trees were blown down, additional homes sustained lesser roof damage, a few sheds were blown over, and power lines were toppled as well.
F0	N of Janice	Perry	MS	31.0333°N 89.0333°W	08:40–08:42	0.2 mi (0.32 km)	30 yd (27 m)	Trees were downed.
F1	S of Hickory to Southern Meridian	Newton, Lauderdale	MS	32.2833°N 89.0167°W	08:41–08:56	12 mi (19 km)	300 yd (270 m)	Several homes sustained minor roof damage. Several hundred trees were snapped or uprooted.
F1	SE of Bogue Chitto	Lincoln	MS	31.3667°N 90.3833°W	08:50–08:55	3 mi (4.8 km)	150 yd (140 m)	A few hundred trees were snapped or uprooted.
F1	SE of Mashulaville	Noxubee	MS	33.05°N 88.7°W	08:50–09:01	7.5 mi (12.1 km)	200 yd (180 m)	This tornado began just 1 mile (1.6 km) south of where the F3 tornado ended. A few hundred trees were snapped or uprooted, and a few power lines were downed.
F1	NE of Macon	Noxubee	MS	33.1667°N 88.3333°W	09:07–09:13	5 mi (8.0 km)	100 yd (91 m)	Numerous trees were snapped and downed. A grain silo was dented and had its roof ripped off. Several power lines were downed as well.
F0	ESE of Richton	Greene	MS	31.3°N 88.75°W	09:10–09:13	0.3 mi (0.48 km)	30 yd (27 m)	Trees were downed.
F0	State Line	Wayne	MS	31.4333°N 88.4833°W	09:25–09:27	0.2 mi (0.32 km)	30 yd (27 m)	Trees were downed.
F2	S of Thomaston	Marengo	AL	32.1667°N 87.7333°W	10:10–10:31	11.9 mi (19.2 km)	200 yd (180 m)	A strong tornado caused extensive damage to three mobile homes and moderate damage to two residential homes. Another mobile home and carport were damaged as well. Numerous trees and power lines were blown down or snapped. Two people were injured.
F1	W of Fulton	Clarke	AL	31.7833°N 87.85°W	10:35–10:40	3 mi (4.8 km)	100 yd (91 m)	An F1 tornado destroyed 3 manufactured homes and damaged 13 residential homes.
F0	SE of Silas	Choctaw	AL	31.7667°N 88.3333°W	10:40–10:43	0.5 mi (0.80 km)	30 yd (27 m)	Several trees were damaged.
F0	E of Thomaston	Marengo, Dallas	AL	32.2667°N 87.4833°W	10:43–10:52	5 mi (8.0 km)	50 yd (46 m)	Numerous trees were downed or snapped.
F1	Westwego to Harvey	Jefferson	LA	29.9°N 90.1333°W	10:50–11:00	4.5 mi (7.2 km)	75 yd (69 m)	The tornado caused significant damage in Westwego, where 25 to 30 commercial buildings sustained primarily minor damage to roofs and plate glass windows. In Harvey, an air conditioning unit was ripped off of a school building and several trees were downed.
F1	Marion Junction to W of Valley Grande	Dallas	AL	32.4333°N 87.2333°W	11:07–11:33	14.7 mi (23.7 km)	300 yd (270 m)	Several structures were damaged, and numerous trees were snapped or blown down. One person was injured.
F0	Beatrice	Stone	MS	30.7333°N 88.95°W	11:10–11:12	0.2 mi (0.32 km)	30 yd (27 m)	Several trees were damaged.
F0	S of McCalla	Jefferson	AL	33.2833°N 87.0167°W	11:28–11:29	1 mi (1.6 km)	50 yd (46 m)	Two residential homes and at least four manufactured homes sustained minor damage. A few outbuildings were damaged as well, with debris from one thrown into a tree 40 feet (12 m) above the ground. Numerous trees were snapped or uprooted.
F2	N of Jones to SE of Weogufka	Autauga, Chilton, Coosa	AL	32.6°N 86.9°W	11:49–12:46	49.1 mi (79.0 km)	1,400 yd (1,300 m)	A very large and long-tracked strong tornado severely damaged or destroyed several homes, businesses, mobile homes, and outbuildings along its path. Thousands of trees were downed or snapped as well. The tornado may have been stronger than officially assessed, but it occurred over largely rural areas.
F0	SE of Selma	Dallas	AL	32.3°N 86.9°W	11:56–11:58	1.1 mi (1.8 km)	50 yd (46 m)	Numerous trees were downed or snapped, and a few mobile homes sustained minor damage.
F2	Gulfport	Harrison	MS	30.4333°N 89.0833°W	12:00–12:05	1.5 mi (2.4 km)	50 yd (46 m)	A strong tornado in Gulfport destroyed a large church under construction, caused severe damage to 3 homes and 5 businesses, and caused minor damage to 20 homes.
F2	E of Autaugaville	Autauga	AL	32.3833°N 86.6667°W	12:24–12:37	9.7 mi (15.6 km)	500 yd (460 m)	Several mobile homes, travel campers, and boats were destroyed. Two high-voltage power line towers were crumpled. Several structures were partially damaged or completely destroyed. One person was injured.
F1	SE of Childersburg	Talladega	AL	33.25°N 86.35°W	12:36–12:37	0.9 mi (1.4 km)	50 yd (46 m)	One mobile home was destroyed and another was heavily damaged. One residential home sustained minor damage, and several outbuildings and barns sustained moderate damage.
F0	S of Riverside	Talladega, St. Clair	AL	33.55°N 86.2333°W	12:41–12:52	5.7 mi (9.2 km)	250 yd (230 m)	Many homes sustained roof damage. Numerous trees and power lines were downed. Several vehicles and one home were damaged by fallen trees.
F0	NW of Millbrook	Elmore	AL	32.5167°N 86.4°W	12:48–12:50	2.4 mi (3.9 km)	50 yd (46 m)	Several houses were damaged. Numerous trees and power lines were downed or snapped. Several churches sustained damage from fallen trees, and a 3/4 inch (19 mm) gas main was broken as well.
F0	SW of Winterboro	Talladega	AL	33.3167°N 86.2°W	12:48–12:52	3.3 mi (5.3 km)	100 yd (91 m)	One home had its roof destroyed while two others suffered minor roof damage. Numerous trees were downed or snapped.
F2	Talladega Superspeedway to Southwestern Anniston	Talladega, Calhoun	AL	33.5833°N 86.0667°W	12:59–13:22	15.2 mi (24.5 km)	500 yd (460 m)	1 death – A strong tornado began at the Talladega Superspeedway. It blew the roofs off two concession stands within the infield area of the race track. Buildings in the Bush Garage area were damaged and had their garage doors bowed out. A digital leaderboard was completely destroyed and another one sustained major damage. Along the remainder of the track in Talladega County, several outbuildings were destroyed and numerous trees were downed or snapped. Two homes sustained major roof damage and had their porches destroyed before the tornado crossed into Calhoun County. There, two mobile homes were severely damaged by fallen trees, killing an elderly woman. A residential home was significantly damaged, and a shed was destroyed. Near the end of the tornado's track in southwestern Anniston, a cinder block building sustained major damage, and an animal shelter sustained major roof damage. Several other businesses were damaged as well.
F1	S of Millerville	Tallapoosa, Clay	AL	33.1167°N 85.9167°W	13:09–13:23	13.7 mi (22.0 km)	300 yd (270 m)	Numerous trees were snapped or uprooted. At least 10 residential homes sustained varying degrees of damage in the Bluff Springs community. Numerous outbuildings, garages, and sheds were demolished. Several vehicles were damaged by fallen trees.
F0	Mon Louis	Mobile	AL	30.4333°N 88.1°W	13:10–13:12	0.1 mi (0.16 km)	20 yd (18 m)	Several trees were damaged.
F0	SW of Cecil	Montgomery	AL	32.2667°N 86.0333°W	13:24–13:28	4.8 mi (7.7 km)	75 yd (69 m)	Several trees were downed or snapped. Several outbuildings and at least two barns were damaged or destroyed. A garage had its roof blown off, and at least three homes sustained shingle damage.
F0	SE of Daviston	Tallapoosa	AL	33.0333°N 85.6167°W	13:35–13:36	0.8 mi (1.3 km)	30 yd (27 m)	Several large trees were snapped.
F0	Fairhope	Baldwin	AL	30.5167°N 87.9°W	13:55–13:56	0.1 mi (0.16 km)	30 yd (27 m)	A large waterspout over Mobile Bay moved onshore in Fairhope but did not cause damage.
F0	SE of Opelika	Lee	AL	32.6167°N 85.3333°W	14:09	0.25 mi (0.40 km)	30 yd (27 m)	A very brief tornado caused minor damage to several structures. A few trees and power lines were blown down as well.
F1	Milton	Santa Rosa	FL	30.6333°N 87.0333°W	14:55–14:57	1 mi (1.6 km)	50 yd (46 m)	Several FEMA trailers, brought into the area after Hurricane Ivan, and several roofs were damaged.
F1	S of Freeport	Walton	FL	30.45°N 86.1333°W	16:41	0.2 mi (0.32 km)	100 yd (91 m)	Several homes were damaged.
F0	NE of Freeport	Walton	FL	30.5833°N 85.9333°W	16:55	0.2 mi (0.32 km)	50 yd (46 m)	One home sustained minor damage.
F0	Panama City Beach	Bay	FL	30.1833°N 85.8°W	17:50	0.1 mi (0.16 km)	50 yd (46 m)	A waterspout moved onshore and caused minor structural damage to a construction site.
F0	NW of Santuc	Union	SC	34.65°N 81.5333°W	19:25	0.5 mi (0.80 km)	50 yd (46 m)	A brief tornado caused minor damage.
F0	NE of Aiken	Aiken	SC	33.65°N 81.6°W	20:03–20:04	0.5 mi (0.80 km)	80 yd (73 m)	Trees were uprooted on a horse farm.
F0	NW of Greensburg	Decatur	IN	39.3667°N 85.5333°W	22:10–22:11	0.5 mi (0.80 km)	50 yd (46 m)	The roof of a barn was ripped off, cars were blown off I-74, and trees were downed.
F1	SE of Rushville	Rush, Franklin	IN	39.5°N 85.3°W	22:25–22:31	2.1 mi (3.4 km)	50 yd (46 m)	A garage and a barn were completely destroyed. Several homes and buildings sustained structural damage. A shed was moved 30 feet (9.1 m). Numerous trees and a power pole were snapped.
F0	S of Boston	Wayne	IN	39.7167°N 84.85°W	23:02–23:04	0.1 mi (0.16 km)	10 yd (9.1 m)	Three power poles were downed and moved about 1 foot (0.30 m).

== See also ==
- List of North American tornadoes and tornado outbreaks
- November 1992 tornado outbreak
