= Eidson Road, Texas =

- CDP
- Coordinates: 28°40′27″N 100°28′59″W
- Country: United States
- State: Texas
- County: Maverick

Area
  - Total: 7.5 sq mi (19.4 km^{2})
  - Land: 7.1 sq mi (18.4 km^{2})
  - Water: 0.39 sq mi (1.0 km^{2})
- Elevation: 751 ft (229 m)

Population (2020)
  - Total: 9,461
  - Density: 1,330/sq mi (514/km^{2})
- Time zone: UTC-6 (Central (CST))
  - Summer (DST): UTC-5 (CDT)
- ZIP code: 78852
- Area code: 830
- FIPS code: 48-22810
- GNIS feature ID: 1852702

Eidson Road is a census-designated place (CDP) in Maverick County, Texas, United States. The population was 9,461 at the 2020 census.

== Geography ==
Eidson Road is located at 28°40′27″N 100°28′59″W (28.674215, -100.483153).

According to the United States Census Bureau, the CDP has a total area of 7.5 square miles (19 km^{2}), of which 7.1 square miles (18 km^{2}) is land and 0.4 square miles (1.0 km^{2}) (4.95%) is water.

== Demographics ==
Historical population
| Census | Pop. | Note | %± |
|---|---|---|---|
| 2000 | 9,348 | | — |
| 2010 | 8,960 | | −4.2% |
| 2020 | 9,461 | | 5.6% |
U.S. Decennial Census; 1850–1900 1910; 1920 1930 1940; 1950 1960 1970; 1980 1990 2000; 2010

Eidson Road first appeared as a census designated place in the 2000 U.S. census.

=== 2020 census ===
Eidson Road CDP, Texas – Racial and ethnic composition Note: the US Census treats Hispanic/Latino as an ethnic category. This table excludes Latinos from the racial categories and assigns them to a separate category. Hispanics/Latinos may be of any race.
| Race / Ethnicity (NH = Non-Hispanic) | Pop 2000 | Pop 2010 | Pop 2020 | % 2000 | % 2010 | % 2020 |
|---|---|---|---|---|---|---|
| White alone (NH) | 114 | 42 | 88 | 1.22% | 0.47% | 0.93% |
| Black or African American alone (NH) | 12 | 9 | 0 | 0.13% | 0.10% | 0.00% |
| Native American or Alaska Native alone (NH) | 10 | 38 | 11 | 0.11% | 0.42% | 0.12% |
| Asian alone (NH) | 3 | 1 | 5 | 0.03% | 0.01% | 0.05% |
| Native Hawaiian or Pacific Islander alone (NH) | 0 | 0 | 1 | 0.00% | 0.00% | 0.01% |
| Other race alone (NH) | 0 | 0 | 14 | 0.00% | 0.00% | 0.15% |
| Mixed race or Multiracial (NH) | 7 | 6 | 15 | 0.07% | 0.07% | 0.16% |
| Hispanic or Latino (any race) | 9,202 | 8,864 | 9,327 | 98.44% | 98.93% | 98.58% |
| Total | 9,348 | 8,960 | 9,461 | 100.00% | 100.00% | 100.00% |

As of the 2020 United States census, there were 9,461 people, 2,486 households, and 2,012 families residing in the CDP.

=== 2000 census ===
As of the census of 2000, there were 9,348 people, 2,232 households, and 2,077 families residing in the CDP. The population density was 1,315.2 inhabitants per square mile (507.8/km^{2}). There were 2,583 housing units at an average density of 363.4 per square mile (140.3/km^{2}). The racial makeup of the CDP was 76.48% White, 0.39% African American, 0.67% Native American, 0.04% Asian, 19.39% from other races, and 3.03% from two or more races. Hispanic or Latino of any race were 98.44% of the population.

There were 2,232 households, out of which 61.3% had children under the age of 18 living with them, 76.2% were married couples living together, 13.7% had a female householder with no husband present, and 6.9% were non-families. 6.3% of all households were made up of individuals, and 3.0% had someone living alone who was 65 years of age or older. The average household size was 4.19 and the average family size was 4.38.

In the CDP, the population was spread out, with 40.9% under the age of 18, 10.4% from 18 to 24, 26.8% from 25 to 44, 16.1% from 45 to 64, and 5.9% who were 65 years of age or older. The median age was 24 years. For every 100 females, there were 94.3 males. For every 100 females age 18 and over, there were 91.8 males.

The median income for a household in the CDP was $19,355, and the median income for a family was $20,327. Males had a median income of $18,393 versus $13,212 for females. The per capita income for the CDP was $6,115. About 39.4% of families and 41.7% of the population were below the poverty line, including 49.5% of those under age 18 and 41.0% of those age 65 or over.

== Education ==
Eidson Road is served by the Eagle Pass Independent School District.
