= Rosita, Texas =

- CDP

- Location in the United States Location in Texas
- Coordinates: 28°37′28″N 100°26′1″W
- Country: United States
- State: Texas
- County: Maverick

Area
  - Total: 8.0 sq mi (20.6 km^{2})
  - Land: 7.8 sq mi (20.1 km^{2})
  - Water: 0.19 sq mi (0.5 km^{2})
- Elevation: 725 ft (221 m)

Population (2020)
  - Total: 3,501
  - Density: 451/sq mi (174/km^{2})
- Time zone: UTC-6 (Central (CST))
  - Summer (DST): UTC-5 (CDT)
- ZIP code: 78852
- Area code: 830
- FIPS code: 48-63364
- GNIS feature ID: 1852763

Rosita, formerly known as Rosita South, is a census-designated place (CDP) in Maverick County, Texas, United States. The population was 3,501 as of the 2020 census. The Kickapoo Indian Reservation of Texas is located within the community.

== Geography ==
Rosita is located at 28°37′28″N 100°26′1″W (28.624308, -100.433557).

According to the United States Census Bureau, the CDP has a total area of 8.0 square miles (20.6 km^{2}), of which 7.8 square miles (20.1 km^{2}) is land and 0.2 square mile (0.5 km^{2}) (2.64%) is water.

== Demographics ==
Historical population
Census	Pop.	Note	%±
2000	2,574		—
2010	2,704		5.1%
2020	3,501		29.5%
U.S. Decennial Census; 1850–1900 1910; 1920 1930 1940; 1950 1960 1970; 1980 1990 2000; 2010 2020

Rosita was first listed as a census designated place under the name Rosita South in the 2010 U.S. census. The CDP was renamed Rosita in the 2010 U.S. census.

=== Racial and ethnic composition ===
Rosita CDP, Texas – Racial and ethnic composition Note: the US Census treats Hispanic/Latino as an ethnic category. This table excludes Latinos from the racial categories and assigns them to a separate category. Hispanics/Latinos may be of any race.
Race / Ethnicity (NH = Non-Hispanic)	Pop 2000	Pop 2010	Pop 2020	% 2000	% 2010	% 2020
White alone (NH)	56	29	63	2.18%	1.07%	1.80%
Black or African American alone (NH)	5	0	3	0.19%	0.00%	0.09%
Native American or Alaska Native alone (NH)	372	333	710	14.45%	12.32%	20.28%
Asian alone (NH)	0	1	3	0.00%	0.04%	0.09%
Native Hawaiian or Pacific Islander alone (NH)	0	0	0	0.00%	0.00%	0.00%
Other race alone (NH)	0	0	1	0.00%	0.00%	0.03%
Mixed race or Multiracial (NH)	1	5	5	0.04%	0.18%	0.14%
Hispanic or Latino (any race)	2,140	2,336	2,716	83.14%	86.39%	77.58%
Total	2,574	2,704	3,501	100.00%	100.00%	100.00%

=== 2020 census ===
As of the 2020 census, Rosita had a population of 3,501. The median age was 27.6 years. 34.0% of residents were under the age of 18 and 8.7% of residents were 65 years of age or older. For every 100 females, there were 91.4 males, and for every 100 females age 18 and over, there were 92.3 males age 18 and over.

74.2% of residents lived in urban areas, while 25.8% lived in rural areas.

There were 976 households, of which 53.2% had children under the age of 18 living in them. Of all households, 53.6% were married-couple households, 12.4% were households with a male householder and no spouse or partner present, and 28.4% were households with a female householder and no spouse or partner present. About 14.4% of all households were made up of individuals and 5.8% had someone living alone who was 65 years of age or older.

There were 1,128 housing units, of which 13.5% were vacant. The homeowner vacancy rate was 2.0% and the rental vacancy rate was 5.7%.

=== 2000 census ===
As of the census of 2000, there were 2,574 people, 624 households, and 577 families residing in the CDP. The population density was 331.7 inhabitants per square mile (128.1/km^{2}). There were 762 housing units at an average density of 98.2 per square mile (37.9/km^{2}). The racial makeup of the CDP was 58.39% White, 0.19% African American, 15.97% Native American, 0.12% Pacific Islander, 22.69% from other races, and 2.64% from two or more races. Hispanic or Latino of any race were 83.14% of the population.

There were 624 households, out of which 67.8% had children under the age of 18 living with them, 73.1% were married couples living together, 14.9% had a female householder with no husband present, and 7.5% were non-families. 7.2% of all households were made up of individuals, and 2.6% had someone living alone who was 65 years of age or older. The average household size was 4.11 and the average family size was 4.32.

In the CDP, the population was spread out, with 44.8% under the age of 18, 9.2% from 18 to 24, 28.6% from 25 to 44, 11.6% from 45 to 64, and 5.7% who were 65 years of age or older. The median age was 22 years. For every 100 females, there were 96.6 males. For every 100 females age 18 and over, there were 91.1 males.

The median income for a household in the CDP was $19,536, and the median income for a family was $21,333. Males had a median income of $17,500 versus $18,869 for females. The per capita income for the CDP was $6,157. About 41.7% of families and 41.2% of the population were below the poverty line, including 38.6% of those under age 18 and 78.9% of those age 65 or over.

== Education ==
Rosita is served by the Eagle Pass Independent School District.
