= Chula Vista, Maverick County, Texas =

Chula Vista, Texas
- CDP
- Coordinates: 28°39′12″N 100°25′34″W
- Country: United States
- State: Texas
- County: Maverick

Area
  - Total: 3.1 sq mi (7.9 km^{2})
  - Land: 3.1 sq mi (7.9 km^{2})
  - Water: 0 sq mi (0.0 km^{2})
- Elevation: 787 ft (240 m)

Population (2020)
  - Total: 5,100
  - Density: 1,700/sq mi (650/km^{2})
- Time zone: UTC-6 (Central (CST))
  - Summer (DST): UTC-5 (CDT)
- FIPS code: 48-63360
- GNIS feature ID: 1852762

Chula Vista, formerly known as Rosita North, is a census-designated place (CDP) in Maverick County, Texas, United States. The population was 5,100 at the 2020 census.

== Geography ==
Chula Vista is located at 28°39′12″N 100°25′34″W (28.653362, -100.426004).

According to the United States Census Bureau, the CDP has a total area of 3.1 square miles (8.0 km^{2}), of which 3.1 square miles (8.0 km^{2}) is land and 0.33% is water.

== Demographics ==
Historical population
Census	Pop.	Note	%±
2000	3,400		—
2010	3,818		12.3%
2020	5,100		33.6%
U.S. Decennial Census; 1850–1900 1910; 1920 1930 1940; 1950 1960 1970; 1980 1990 2000; 2010

Chula Vista was first listed as a census designated place under the name Rosita North in the 2010 U.S. census. The CDP was renamed Chula Vista in the 2010 U.S. census.

=== 2020 census ===
Chula Vista CDP, Texas – Racial and ethnic composition Note: the US Census treats Hispanic/Latino as an ethnic category. This table excludes Latinos from the racial categories and assigns them to a separate category. Hispanics/Latinos may be of any race.
Race / Ethnicity (NH = Non-Hispanic)	Pop 2000	Pop 2010	Pop 2020	% 2000	% 2010	% 2020
White alone (NH)	30	65	42	0.88%	1.70%	0.82%
Black or African American alone (NH)	1	17	6	0.03%	0.45%	0.12%
Native American or Alaska Native alone (NH)	18	12	28	0.53%	0.31%	0.55%
Asian alone (NH)	0	1	6	0.00%	0.03%	0.12%
Native Hawaiian or Pacific Islander alone (NH)	0	0	2	0.00%	0.00%	0.04%
Other race alone (NH)	0	0	5	0.00%	0.00%	0.10%
Mixed race or Multiracial (NH)	14	0	5	0.41%	0.00%	0.10%
Hispanic or Latino (any race)	3,337	3,723	5,006	98.15%	97.51%	98.16%
Total	3,400	3,818	5,100	100.00%	100.00%	100.00%

As of the census of 2000, there were 3,400 people, 813 households, and 765 families residing in the CDP. The population density was 1,111.8 inhabitants per square mile (429.3/km^{2}). There were 961 housing units at an average density of 314.2 per square mile (121.3/km^{2}). The racial makeup of the CDP was 66.71% White, 0.32% African American, 0.97% Native American, 29.44% from other races, and 2.56% from two or more races. Hispanic or Latino of any race were 98.15% of the population.

There were 813 households, out of which 66.2% had children under the age of 18 living with them, 79.8% were married couples living together, 10.8% had a female householder with no husband present, and 5.8% were non-families. 4.3% of all households were made up of individuals, and 2.2% had someone living alone who was 65 years of age or older. The average household size was 4.18 and the average family size was 4.33.

In the CDP, the population was spread out, with 42.9% under the age of 18, 9.4% from 18 to 24, 29.6% from 25 to 44, 13.2% from 45 to 64, and 5.0% who were 65 years of age or older. The median age was 23 years. For every 100 females, there were 97.7 males. For every 100 females age 18 and over, there were 93.1 males.

The median income for a household in the CDP was $17,451, and the median income for a family was $18,667. Males had a median income of $16,658 versus $13,750 for females. The per capita income for the CDP was $5,482. About 45.4% of families and 48.1% of the population were below the poverty line, including 53.7% of those under age 18 and 56.5% of those age 65 or over.

== Education ==
Chula Vista is served by the Eagle Pass Independent School District.
