= Las Quintas Fronterizas, Texas =

- CDP
- Coordinates: 28°41′30″N 100°28′13″W
- Country: United States
- State: Texas
- County: Maverick

Area
  - Total: 0.66 sq mi (1.7 km^{2})
  - Land: 0.66 sq mi (1.7 km^{2})
  - Water: 0 sq mi (0.0 km^{2})
- Elevation: 745 ft (227 m)

Population (2020)
  - Total: 2,326
  - Density: 3,500/sq mi (1,400/km^{2})
- Time zone: UTC-6 (Central (CST))
  - Summer (DST): UTC-5 (CDT)
- FIPS code: 48-41582
- GNIS feature ID: 1852728

Las Quintas Fronterizas is a census-designated place (CDP) in Maverick County, Texas, United States. The population was 2,326 at the 2020 census.

== Geography ==
Las Quintas Fronterizas is located at 28°41′30″N 100°28′13″W (28.691662, -100.470167).

According to the United States Census Bureau, the CDP has a total area of 0.7 square miles (1.8 km^{2}), all land.

== Demographics ==
Historical population
Census	Pop.	Note	%±
2000	2,030		—
2010	3,290		62.1%
2020	2,326		−29.3%
U.S. Decennial Census; 1850–1900 1910; 1920 1930 1940; 1950 1960 1970; 1980 1990 2000; 2010 2020

Las Quintas Fronterizas first appeared as a census designated place in the 2000 U.S. census.

=== 2020 census ===
Las Quintas Fronterizas CDP, Texas – Racial and ethnic composition Note: the US Census treats Hispanic/Latino as an ethnic category. This table excludes Latinos from the racial categories and assigns them to a separate category. Hispanics/Latinos may be of any race.
Race / Ethnicity (NH = Non-Hispanic)	Pop 2010	Pop 2020	% 2010	% 2020
White alone (NH)	33	10	1.00%	0.43%
Black or African American alone (NH)	4	0	0.12%	0.00%
Native American or Alaska Native alone (NH)	0	0	0.00%	0.00%
Asian alone (NH)	0	0	0.00%	0.00%
Native Hawaiian or Pacific Islander alone (NH)	2	0	0.06%	0.00%
Other race alone (NH)	0	3	0.00%	0.13%
Mixed race or Multiracial (NH)	4	5	0.12%	0.21%
Hispanic or Latino (any race)	3,247	2,308	98.69%	99.23%
Total	3,290	2,326	100.00%	100.00%

As of the census of 2000, there were 2,030 people, 489 households, and 448 families residing in the CDP. The population density was 3,047.4 inhabitants per square mile (1,176.6/km^{2}). There were 568 housing units at an average density of 852.7 per square mile (329.2/km^{2}). The racial makeup of the CDP was 76.70% White, 0.59% African American, 0.10% Native American, 19.90% from other races, and 2.71% from two or more races. 99.01% of the population were Hispanic or Latino of any race.

There were 489 households, out of which 60.9% had children under the age of 18 living with them, 74.0% were married couples living together, 15.1% had a female householder with no husband present, and 8.2% were non-families. 8.0% of all households were made up of individuals, and 3.9% had someone living alone who was 65 years of age or older. The average household size was 4.15 and the average family size was 4.40.

In the CDP, the population was spread out, with 39.6% under the age of 18, 10.6% from 18 to 24, 27.3% from 25 to 44, 16.8% from 45 to 64, and 5.6% who were 65 years of age or older. The median age was 25 years. For every 100 females, there were 90.8 males. For every 100 females age 18 and over, there were 86.6 males.

The median income for a household in the CDP was $21,648, and the median income for a family was $23,333. Males had a median income of $16,620 versus $11,429 for females. The per capita income for the CDP was $5,364. About 40.3% of families and 38.5% of the population were below the poverty line, including 41.8% of those under age 18 and 64.2% of those age 65 or over.

== Education ==
The community is served by the Eagle Pass Independent School District.
