= Quemado =

Quemado may refer to:

- Palacio Quemado, presidential palace in Bolivia
- Quemado, New Mexico, unincorporated community in New Mexico
- Quemado, Texas, census-designated place in Texas
