= Normandy, Texas =

- Census-designated place
- Location within Texas Location within the United States
- Coordinates: 28°54′36″N 100°35′52″W
- Country: United States
- State: Texas
- County: Maverick

Area
  - Total: 0.26 sq mi (0.67 km^{2})
  - Land: 0.26 sq mi (0.67 km^{2})
  - Water: 0 sq mi (0.0 km^{2})
- Elevation: 774 ft (236 m)
- Time zone: UTC-6 (Central (CST))
  - Summer (DST): UTC-5 (CDT)
- ZIP Code: 78877 (Quemado)
- Area code: 830
- FIPS code: 48-51828
- GNIS feature ID: 2805813

Normandy is an unincorporated community and census-designated place (CDP) in Maverick County, Texas, United States. It was first listed as a CDP prior to the 2020 census. As of the 2020 census, Normandy had a population of 54.

It is in the northwestern part of the county, along U.S. Route 277 in the Rio Grande valley. It is 16 miles (26 km) north-northwest of Eagle Pass, the Maverick county seat, and 39 miles (63 km) southeast of Del Rio.

== Demographics ==
Historical population
Census	Pop.	Note	%±
2020	54		—
U.S. Decennial Census; 1850–1900 1910; 1920 1930 1940; 1950 1960 1970; 1980 1990 2000; 2010 2020

Normandy first appeared as a census designated place in the 2020 U.S. census.

=== 2020 census ===
Normandy CDP, Texas – Racial and ethnic composition Note: the US Census treats Hispanic/Latino as an ethnic category. This table excludes Latinos from the racial categories and assigns them to a separate category. Hispanics/Latinos may be of any race.
Race / Ethnicity (NH = Non-Hispanic)	Pop 2020	% 2020
White alone (NH)	9	16.67%
Black or African American alone (NH)	0	0.00%
Native American or Alaska Native alone (NH)	1	1.85%
Asian alone (NH)	1	1.85%
Native Hawaiian or Pacific Islander alone (NH)	0	0.00%
Other race alone (NH)	0	0.00%
Mixed race or Multiracial (NH)	0	0.00%
Hispanic or Latino (any race)	43	79.63%
Total	54	100.00%
