= Wallace Leo Jenkins =

American law enforcement officer

Lt. Wallace Leo Jenkins (February 18, 1896 – January 24, 1941) was an American law enforcement officer. He was a pioneer in the use of technology and science in South Carolina law enforcement. Jenkins served with the South Carolina Highway Patrol from its creation in 1930 until his death in 1941. He created and led the Identification Bureau, a unit that evolved into a team of skilled investigators who used technology to fight crime. The ID Bureau later merged with the South Carolina Law Enforcement Division (SLED) and became the foundation for SLED’s Criminal Justice Information Services and Forensics Services units.

== Early life ==
Jenkins was born in Santuc, South Carolina, on February 18, 1896. As a young man he worked as a mechanic for the Overland Automobile Company in Spartanburg. Jenkins attended Columbia University in New York City for two years. His education was interrupted when he volunteered for service in World War I. He served as an officer in the mechanical branch of Naval Aviation. After the war, he returned to South Carolina where he ran his own bus line and maintained a business relationship with Overland.

== South Carolina Highway Patrol ==
In 1930, Jenkins became a member of the first class of the newly formed South Carolina Highway Patrol. On April 19, 1932, Jenkins was severely injured after he stopped a car near Lancaster. The three occupants of the car were escaped convicts who beat Jenkins nearly to death. During a prolonged medical leave, Jenkins was doubtful as to whether he would be physically able to return to duty. As a back-up plan he studied fingerprinting through a correspondence course with the Chicago Institute of Applied Science.

The Federal Bureau of Investigation was in the midst of a campaign to encourage each state to establish a state-level fingerprint repository to work in conjunction with their newly created national file. The South Carolina Police Chiefs Association (SCPCA) was lobbying the state government to create an ID Bureau, and local law enforcement agencies in general supported the idea.

== Creation of the State Identification Bureau ==
When Jenkins returned to work, news of his fingerprinting skills spread quickly. He was promoted to Special Investigator on June 12, 1934, with orders to assist local law enforcement agencies. Jenkins established the state’s first fingerprint repository and the first state-level system of law enforcement communications. In short order, Jenkins was called in on every major crime in the state. The ID Bureau added personnel and expanded their scientific capabilities. Jenkins became a recognized expert in fingerprints, firearms, ballistics, photography and questioned documents.

During the late 1930s he became a household name in South Carolina. He was in demand as a speaker at civic clubs and scientific societies, and his Crime Fighting booth at the annual State Fair drew thousands of visitors.

On May 28, 1940, Jenkins was presented with the SCPCA's Distinguished Service Award. That same year, with war looming, Jenkins assisted the US Army in screening out undesirable recruits at Fort Jackson, the largest military training installation in the country.

== Legacy ==
After a sudden and brief illness, Jenkins died on January 24, 1941, at age 43. The ID Bureau carried on under Jenkins’ protégé, Lt. Joel Townsend.

In a speech to the Columbia Rotary Club on May 14, 1946, Townsend made it clear that Jenkins’ vision for the unit was intact: “It is not a body charged with general law enforcement, and takes the initiative in no case. It only assists and cooperates with other law enforcement agencies throughout South Carolina.”

In 1947 the ID Bureau was moved from the Highway Patrol to the South Carolina Law Enforcement Division. Lt. Townsend was appointed as the Chief of SLED, where he maintained the principles of service derived from his mentor, Leo Jenkins.
