= J. P. Strom =

South Carolinian police chief

- Born: 31 July 1918; McCormick County, South Carolina
- Died: 14 December 1987 (aged 69)
- Known for: The driving force behind a movement towards professionalism in South Carolina law enforcement
- Police career
- Country: 1938–1987
- Department: South Carolina Law Enforcement Division
- Rank: Chief

Joseph Preston "Pete" Strom (July 31, 1918 – December 14, 1987) was an American law enforcement officer who served as the eighth Chief of the South Carolina Law Enforcement Division, established in 1935, from 1956 until his death in 1987. He was considered by many to be the driving force behind a movement towards professionalism in South Carolina law enforcement.

Strom was born July 31, 1918, in McCormick County, South Carolina. When Strom was ten years old, his father, Walter T. Strom, was elected Sheriff of McCormick County and held the office for 12 years. In the custom of the time, the sheriff and his family lived in a house attached to the county jail. Known as a homespun raconteur, Strom said this time "living in the jailhouse" as a youth provided him an education in criminology. Strom began his nearly fifty-year career in law enforcement in 1938 when his father swore him in as a deputy sheriff.

As with other members of the "Greatest Generation", Strom put his career on hold to do his part in World War II by serving in the military. Strom joined the US Air Force and was stationed in France, England, and Austria with the Ninth Air Force.

After the completion of his military duty Strom continued his law enforcement career. He was sworn in as a special agent with the South Carolina Law Enforcement Division in 1947 and quickly rose through the ranks. Strom served as a sergeant, lieutenant, and acting chief before being named chief in 1956 by Governor George Bell Timmerman. Strom went on to serve as chief under a total of eight governors.

In 1961, during the administration of Governor Ernest F. Hollings, Chief Strom appointed the first female SLED agents, Ebby B. Long and Gladys A. Toney, and the first two African-American agents, Joseph Wong and Cambridge Jenkins, Jr.

Strom was known as a strong advocate of education for law enforcement officers and the expanded use of science and technology to solve crimes. Under his tenure, the crime laboratory was significantly expanded and computerized crime information systems were implemented. In 1968 Strom oversaw the creation of the South Carolina Police Academy, funded by a federal grant and housed on the SLED campus. Two years later, Strom was successful in his efforts to establish a permanent state-funded institution to educate law enforcement officers, the South Carolina Criminal Justice Academy. Strom served for many years as the Chairman of the South Carolina Law Enforcement Training Council, which governs the academy. The top academic student of each class is recognized with the J. P. Strom Award.

Strom's philosophy for enforcing the law reflected his respect for individual rights. SLED agents to this day carry cards bearing Strom's credo: "Make sure a man is guilty before you affect his reputation, his freedom, or his pocketbook. Make sure that during your investigation you always assure yourself that you are the fairest juror a suspect will ever have."

Strom was the recipient of many national honors, and served as the president of the Federal Bureau of Investigation's National Academy Associates from 1964 to 1965. He served as a special adviser to the International Association of Police Chiefs, and in 1973 Strom was in consideration to head the FBI after the death of J. Edgar Hoover.

Strom was noted for the "understanding, decency, and sensitivity" he brought to law enforcement at an event in 1979 attended by over 1,000 South Carolinians. The event raised $10,000 for the J. P. Strom Endowment Fund, providing scholarships to encourage leadership in law enforcement. The J. P. Strom Undergraduate Scholarship is available to University of South Carolina students in the Department of Criminology and Criminal Justice who demonstrate outstanding academic achievement, leadership, and service.
