= Siesta Acres, Texas =

- Unincorporated community
- Location within Texas Location within the United States
- Coordinates: 28°45′29″N 100°29′25″W
- Country: United States
- State: Texas
- County: Maverick

Area
  - Total: 0.410 sq mi (1.06 km^{2})
  - Land: 0.409 sq mi (1.06 km^{2})
  - Water: 0.001 sq mi (0.0026 km^{2})
- Elevation: 768 ft (234 m)

Population (2020)
  - Total: 1,866
  - Density: 4,560/sq mi (1,760/km^{2})
- Time zone: UTC-6 (Central (CST))
  - Summer (DST): UTC-5 (CDT)
- Area code: 830
- GNIS feature ID: 2652416

Siesta Acres is an unincorporated community and census-designated place in Maverick County, Texas, United States. Its population was 1,866 as of the 2020 census. U.S. Route 277 passes through the community.

== Geography ==
According to the U.S. Census Bureau, the community has an area of 0.410 square miles (1.06 km^{2}); 0.409 square miles (1.06 km^{2}) of its area is land, and 0.001 square miles (0.0026 km^{2}) is water.

== Demographics ==
Historical population
Census	Pop.	Note	%±
2010	1,885		—
2020	1,866		−1.0%
U.S. Decennial Census; 1850–1900 1910; 1920 1930 1940; 1950 1960 1970; 1980 1990 2000; 2010 2020

Siesta Acres first appeared as a census designated place in the 2010 U.S. census.

=== 2020 census ===
Siesta Acres CDP, Texas – Racial and ethnic composition Note: the US Census treats Hispanic/Latino as an ethnic category. This table excludes Latinos from the racial categories and assigns them to a separate category. Hispanics/Latinos may be of any race.
Race / Ethnicity (NH = Non-Hispanic)	Pop 2010	Pop 2020	% 2010	% 2020
White alone (NH)	13	39	0.69%	2.09%
Black or African American alone (NH)	0	1	0.00%	0.05%
Native American or Alaska Native alone (NH)	0	3	0.00%	0.16%
Asian alone (NH)	0	2	0.00%	0.11%
Native Hawaiian or Pacific Islander alone (NH)	0	0	0.00%	0.00%
Other race alone (NH)	1	0	0.05%	0.00%
Mixed race or Multiracial (NH)	0	5	0.00%	0.27%
Hispanic or Latino (any race)	1,871	1,816	99.26%	97.32%
Total	1,885	1,866	100.00%	100.00%
