= Seco Mines, Texas =

- CDP
- Location within Texas Location within the United States
- Coordinates: 28°44′51″N 100°29′50″W
- Country: United States
- State: Texas
- County: Maverick

Area
  - Total: 0.579 sq mi (1.50 km^{2})
  - Land: 0.561 sq mi (1.45 km^{2})
  - Water: 0.018 sq mi (0.047 km^{2})
- Elevation: 735 ft (224 m)

Population (2020)
  - Total: 572
  - Density: 1,020/sq mi (394/km^{2})
- Time zone: UTC-6 (Central (CST))
  - Summer (DST): UTC-5 (CDT)
- Area code: 830
- GNIS feature ID: 1384235

Seco Mines is an unincorporated community and census-designated place in Maverick County, Texas, United States. Its population was 572 as of the 2020 census. U.S. Route 277 passes through the community.

== Geography ==
According to the U.S. Census Bureau, the community has an area of 0.579 square miles (1.50 km^{2}); 0.561 square miles (1.45 km^{2}) of its area is land, and 0.018 square miles (0.047 km^{2}) is water.

== Demographics ==
Historical population
Census	Pop.	Note	%±
2010	560		—
2020	572		2.1%
U.S. Decennial Census; 1850–1900 1910; 1920 1930 1940; 1950 1960 1970; 1980 1990 2000; 2010

Seco Mines first appeared as a census designated place in the 2010 U.S. census.

Seco Mines CDP, Texas – Racial and ethnic composition Note: the US Census treats Hispanic/Latino as an ethnic category. This table excludes Latinos from the racial categories and assigns them to a separate category. Hispanics/Latinos may be of any race.
Race / Ethnicity (NH = Non-Hispanic)	Pop 2010	Pop 2020	% 2010	% 2020
White alone (NH)	19	11	3.39%	1.92%
Black or African American alone (NH)	1	0	0.18%	0.00%
Native American or Alaska Native alone (NH)	0	0	0.00%	0.00%
Asian alone (NH)	0	0	0.00%	0.00%
Native Hawaiian or Pacific Islander alone (NH)	0	0	0.00%	0.00%
Other race alone (NH)	0	2	0.00%	0.35%
Mixed race or Multiracial (NH)	0	0	0.00%	0.00%
Hispanic or Latino (any race)	540	559	96.43%	97.73%
Total	560	572	100.00%	100.00%
