= South Carolina Law Enforcement Division =

Investigative law enforcement agency in South Carolina, US

Agency overview
- Formed: 1935

Jurisdictional structure
- Operations jurisdiction: South Carolina

The South Carolina Law Enforcement Division (SLED) is a statewide investigative law enforcement agency in South Carolina. SLED provides manpower and technical assistance to other law enforcement agencies and conducts investigations on behalf of the state as directed by the Governor and Attorney General. SLED Headquarters is located in the state capital, Columbia, with offices in the Midlands, Piedmont, Pee Dee, and Low Country regions.

== History ==
The South Carolina Law Enforcement Division was created in 1935 by Act 232 of the South Carolina General Assembly "for the purpose of enforcing the state liquor law [...] and to assist any law enforcement officer in the detection of crime and the enforcement of any criminal laws of the state of South Carolina." SLED replaced the old state constabulary which had been created in 1893 and then disbanded in 1932 due to the financial constraints of the Great Depression.

The 1935 law provided $70,000.00 to fund the new organization. Governor Olin D. Johnston appointed J. Henry Jeanes, a veteran law enforcement officer and Chief of the Pelzer Police Department, as the first Chief of SLED. He in turn hired twenty-one constables from around the state.

Although SLED initially focused on enforcement of the liquor laws, within a short period of time the Division was also investigating cases of all sorts, including murder, lynching, and labor violence.

In 1947 the State Identification Bureau, a unit of the South Carolina Highway Patrol, was transferred to SLED by a Concurrent Resolution of the General Assembly. The head of the I. D. Bureau, Lt. Joel Townsend, was appointed Chief of SLED.

In 1961, under the administration of Governor Ernest F. Hollings, Chief J. P. Strom appointed the first female SLED Agents, Ebby B. Long and Gladys A. Toney.

That same year he also appointed the first African-American Agents, Joseph Wong and Cambridge Jenkins, Jr.

In 1974, Act 1240 of the General Assembly formally established SLED as an independent state agency.

== Mission ==
SLED has exclusive jurisdiction over a wide variety of law enforcement functions in South Carolina, including the operation of a statewide criminal justice information system, coordination of counter-terrorism efforts, and the investigation of arson and explosive devices. SLED is also responsible for investigating child fatalities, crimes against vulnerable adults, and the interdiction of narcotics. The agency operates the state's forensics laboratory and maintains specialized tactical response units. In addition, SLED regulates the sale and consumption of alcoholic beverages in the state. It also licenses security guards, private investigators and polygraph examiners. SLED also oversees Governor appointed and Commissioned State Constables.

== Organization ==
SLED is made up of civilian employees and law enforcement officers that have many different specialties and areas of expertise. The major bureaus within SLED include:

- Criminal Justice Information Services;
- Investigative Services;
- Forensic Services;
- Counter-terrorism/Tactical Services;
- Regulatory Services.

=== Criminal Justice Information Services ===
SLED's Criminal Justice Information Services (CJIS) is the hub of law enforcement information for the state. Databases of fingerprints, criminal records, sex offenders and investigative matters are linked to other states through connections with the FBI's National Crime Information Center.

SLED CJIS publishes Crime in South Carolina on an annual basis in order to provide crime statistics to the public and policy makers.

SLED CJIS also assists citizens who need background checks conducted for employment, adoption, and other reasons. The history of CJIS dates back to the 1930s, when the South Carolina Highway Patrol established the first state level Identification Bureau under the leadership of Wallace Leo Jenkins.

=== Investigative Services ===
Agents assigned to Investigative Services work cases involving all types of offenses, including crimes of violence, computer crimes, vehicle theft, child fatalities, and crimes against vulnerable adults.

SLED Agents also investigate officer-involved shootings, public corruption, insurance fraud, as well as narcotics and alcoholic beverage violations.

=== Forensic Services ===
SLED's Forensic Laboratory processes and analyzes physical evidence in support of criminal investigations. Units within the lab specialize in DNA, toxicology, drug identification, latent fingerprints, questioned documents, firearms, and trace evidence. Agents assigned to the lab process crime scenes throughout the state to document and collect evidence.

=== Counter-terrorism/Tactical Services ===
Counterterrorism and Tactical Services includes units that specialize in explosive devices, arson, and Special Weapons and Tactics (SWAT). SLED also maintains a kennel of tracking bloodhounds, helicopters, and a fleet of specialized response vehicles.

=== Regulatory Services ===
Regulatory Services serves as a licensing bureau for security guards, private investigators, and citizens with concealed weapons permits. The Alcohol Licensing Unit works in conjunction with the S.C. Department of Revenue Alcohol Beverage Licensing Department in the processing of certain types of alcohol license applications for the state of South Carolina. SLED Regulatory also oversees Governor appointed State Constables per SC Statute 23-1-60 for training, policies and procedures and receives quarterly reports of their actions taken as law enforcement officers.

== Chiefs ==
The following Chiefs have served since 1935:

- J. Henry Jeanes, 1935–1941
- G. R. Richardson, 1941–1942
- S. J. Pratt, 1942–1943
- A. Roy Ashley, 1943–1946
- G. R. Richardson, 1946–1947
- Joel D. Townsend, 1947–1949
- Oren L. Brady, 1949–1956
- J. P. Strom, 1956–1987, died 1987
- Robert Stewart, 1988–2007
- Reginald Lloyd, 2008–2011
- Mark Keel, 2011–present

== See also ==
- State Bureau of Investigation
