= Elm Creek, Texas =

- Census-designated place
- Coordinates: 28°46′25″N 100°29′27″W
- Country: United States
- State: Texas
- County: Maverick

Area
  - Total: 1.1 sq mi (2.8 km^{2})
  - Land: 1.1 sq mi (2.8 km^{2})
  - Water: 0 sq mi (0.0 km^{2})
- Elevation: 751 ft (229 m)

Population (2020)
  - Total: 2,884
- Time zone: UTC-6 (Central (CST))
  - Summer (DST): UTC-5 (CDT)
- ZIP code: 78852
- Area code: 830
- FIPS code: 48-23254
- GNIS feature ID: 1852704

Elm Creek is a census-designated place (CDP) in Maverick County, Texas, United States. The population was 2,884 as of the 2020 census.

== Geography ==
Elm Creek is located at 28°46′25″N 100°29′27″W (28.773525, -100.490801).

According to the United States Census Bureau, the CDP has a total area of 2.8 square miles (7.3 km^{2}), all land.

== Demographics ==
Historical population
Census	Pop.	Note	%±
2000	1,928		—
2010	2,469		28.1%
2020	2,884		16.8%
U.S. Decennial Census; 1850–1900 1910; 1920 1930 1940; 1950 1960 1970; 1980 1990 2000; 2010

Elm Creek first appeared as a census designated place in the 2000 U.S. census.

=== 2020 census ===
Elm Creek CDP, Texas – Racial and ethnic composition Note: the US Census treats Hispanic/Latino as an ethnic category. This table excludes Latinos from the racial categories and assigns them to a separate category. Hispanics/Latinos may be of any race.
Race / Ethnicity (NH = Non-Hispanic)	Pop 2000	Pop 2010	Pop 2020	% 2000	% 2010	% 2020
White alone (NH)	49	48	37	2.54%	1.94%	1.28%
Black or African American alone (NH)	1	0	0	0.05%	0.00%	0.00%
Native American or Alaska Native alone (NH)	4	0	2	0.21%	0.00%	0.07%
Asian alone (NH)	0	0	0	0.00%	0.00%	0.00%
Native Hawaiian or Pacific Islander alone (NH)	0	0	0	0.00%	0.00%	0.00%
Other race alone (NH)	0	1	5	0.00%	0.04%	0.17%
Mixed race or Multiracial (NH)	1	0	1	0.05%	0.00%	0.03%
Hispanic or Latino (any race)	1,873	2,420	2,839	97.15%	98.02%	98.44%
Total	1,928	2,469	2,884	100.00%	100.00%	100.00%

== Education ==
Elm Creek is served by the Eagle Pass Independent School District.
