= Fabrica, Texas =

- CDP
- Location within Texas Location within the United States
- Coordinates: 28°44′41″N 100°29′36″W
- Country: United States
- State: Texas
- County: Maverick

Area
  - Total: 0.310 sq mi (0.80 km^{2})
  - Land: 0.310 sq mi (0.80 km^{2})
  - Water: 0 sq mi (0 km^{2})
- Elevation: 719 ft (219 m)

Population (2020)
  - Total: 772
  - Density: 2,490/sq mi (962/km^{2})
- Time zone: UTC-6 (Central (CST))
  - Summer (DST): UTC-5 (CDT)
- Area code: 830
- GNIS feature ID: 2586928

Fabrica is an unincorporated community and census-designated place in Maverick County, Texas, United States. Its population was 772 as of the 2020 census. U.S. Route 277 passes through the community.

== Geography ==
According to the U.S. Census Bureau, the community has an area of 0.310 square miles (0.80 km^{2}), all land.

== Demographics ==
Historical population
Census	Pop.	Note	%±
2010	923		—
2020	772		−16.4%
U.S. Decennial Census; 1850–1900 1910; 1920 1930 1940; 1950 1960 1970; 1980 1990 2000; 2010 2020

Fabrica first appeared as a census designated place in the 2010 U.S. census.

Fabrica CDP, Texas – Racial and ethnic composition Note: the US Census treats Hispanic/Latino as an ethnic category. This table excludes Latinos from the racial categories and assigns them to a separate category. Hispanics/Latinos may be of any race.
Race / Ethnicity (NH = Non-Hispanic)	Pop 2010	Pop 2020	% 2010	% 2020
White alone (NH)	17	14	1.84%	1.81%
Black or African American alone (NH)	0	0	0.00%	0.00%
Native American or Alaska Native alone (NH)	0	1	0.00%	0.13%
Asian alone (NH)	0	1	0.00%	0.13%
Native Hawaiian or Pacific Islander alone (NH)	0	0	0.00%	0.00%
Other race alone (NH)	0	6	0.00%	0.78%
Mixed race or Multiracial (NH)	1	0	0.11%	0.00%
Hispanic or Latino (any race)	905	750	98.05%	97.15%
Total	923	772	100.00%	100.00%
