= Maverick County, Texas =

County in Texas, United States

- County
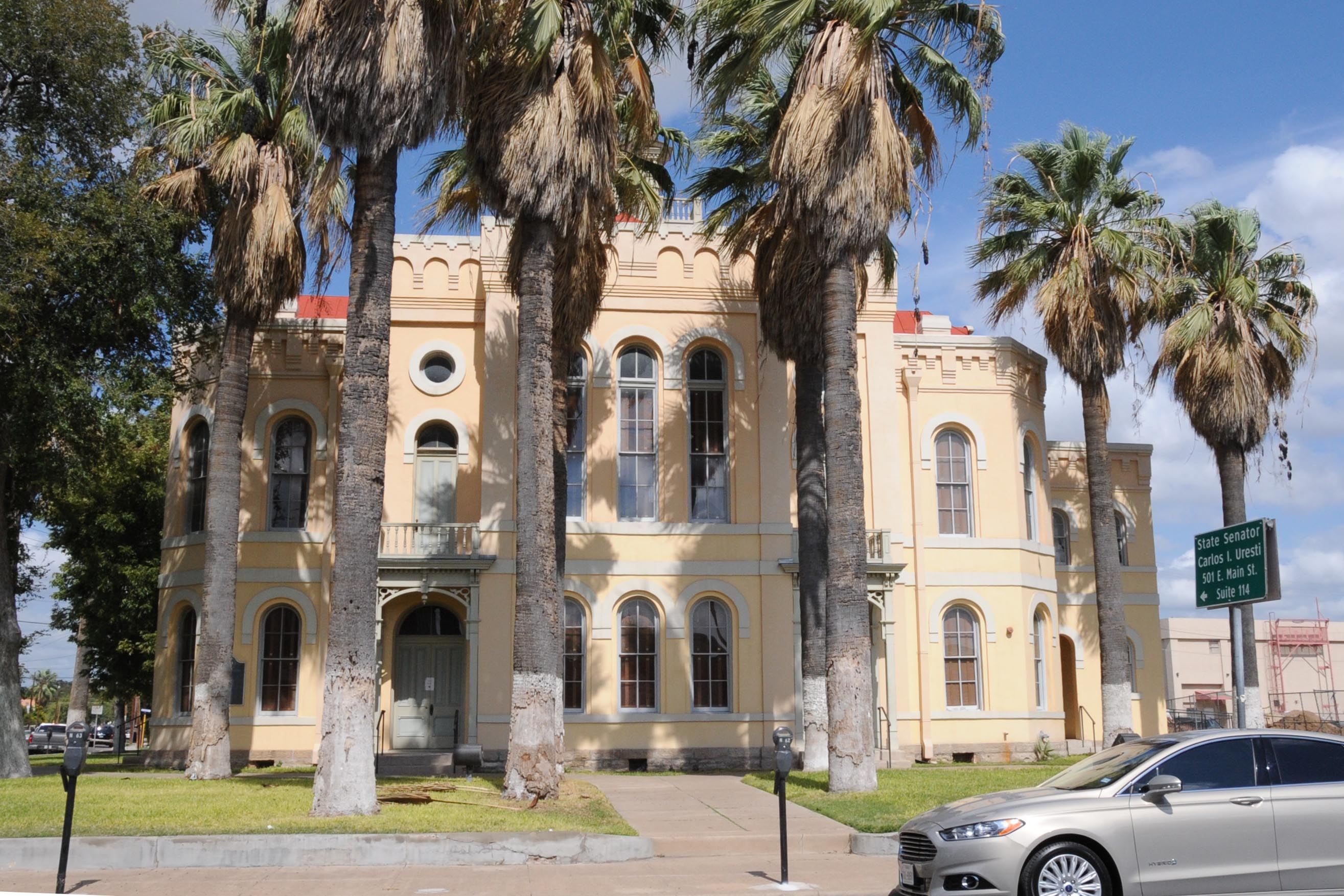
- Historic Maverick County Courthouse in Eagle Pass

- Location within the U.S. state of Texas
- Coordinates: 28°45′N 100°19′W
- Country: United States
- State: Texas
- Founded: 1871
- Named for: Samuel Maverick
- Seat: Eagle Pass
- Largest city: Eagle Pass

Area
  - Total: 1,292 sq mi (3,350 km^{2})
  - Land: 1,279 sq mi (3,310 km^{2})
  - Water: 13 sq mi (34 km^{2}) 1.0%

Population (2020)
  - Total: 57,887
  - Estimate (2025): 58,823 ▲
  - Density: 42/sq mi (16/km^{2})
- Time zone: UTC−6 (Central)
  - Summer (DST): UTC−5 (CDT)
- Congressional district: 23rd
- Website: co.maverick.tx.us

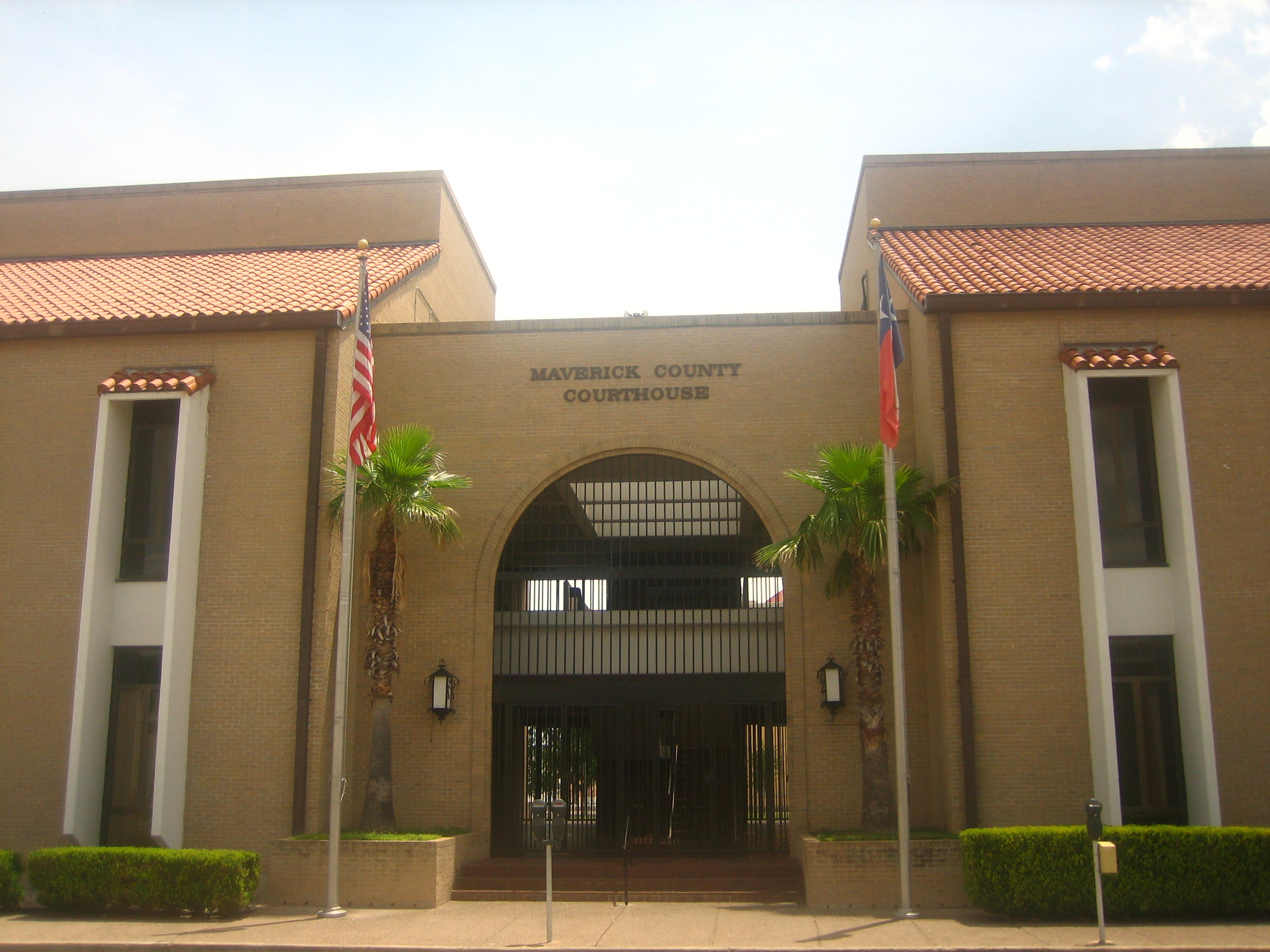
The new county courthouse

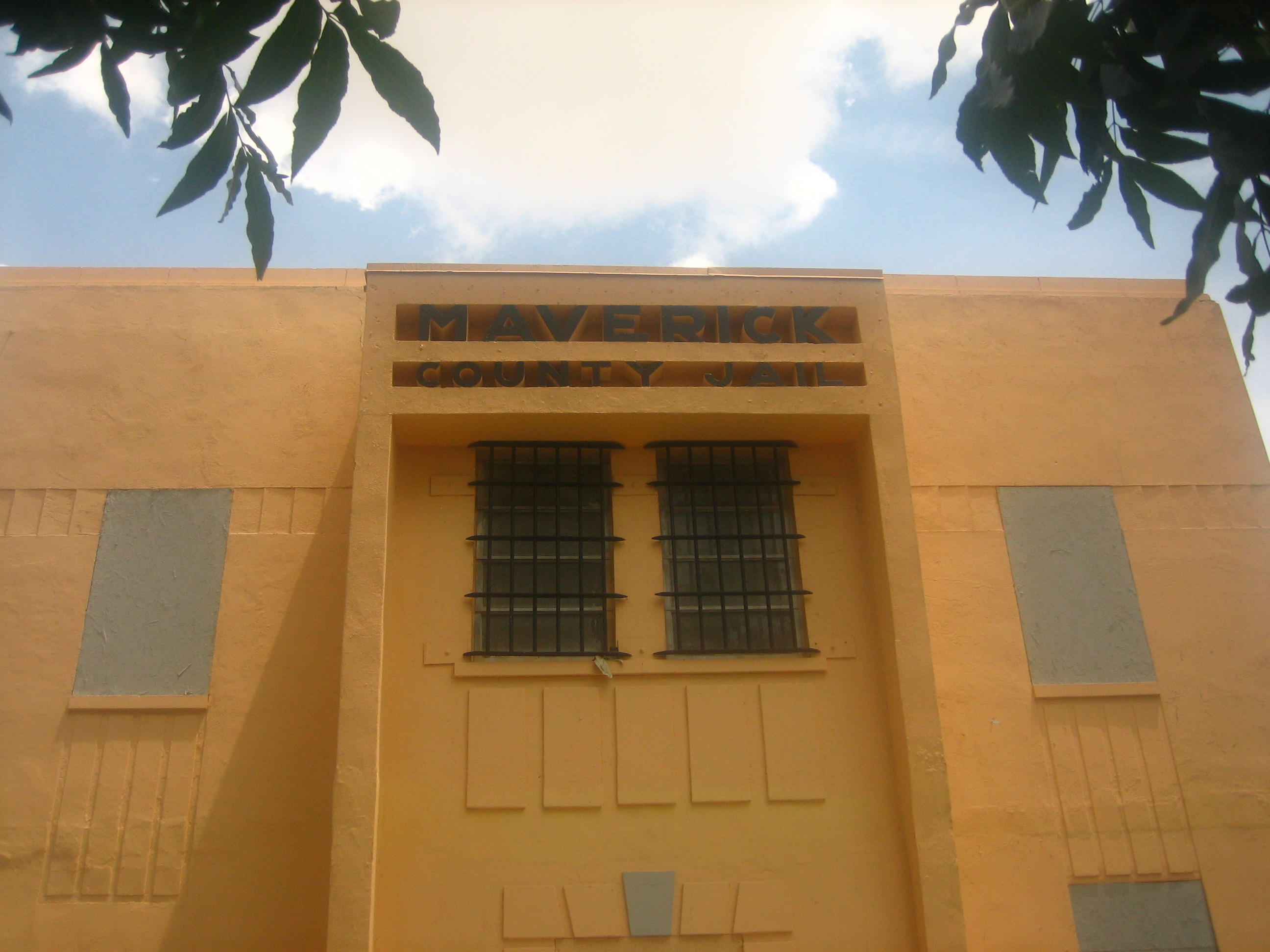
The Maverick County Jail, established 1949, is adjacent to the county courthouse.

Maverick County is a county located in the U.S. state of Texas. As of the 2020 census, its population was 57,887. Its county seat is Eagle Pass. The county was created in 1856 and organized in 1871. It is named for Samuel Maverick, cattleman and state legislator.

The Eagle Pass, TX Micropolitan Statistical Area includes all of Maverick County. It is east of the Mexican border.

== History ==
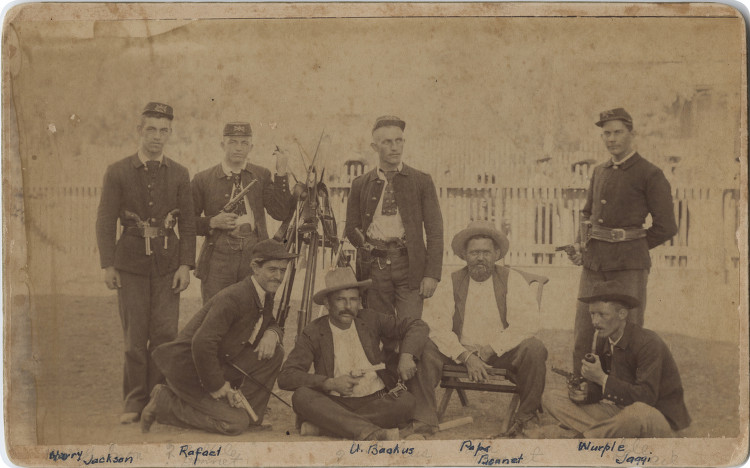
Soldiers in Eagle Pass in 1891, photo courtesy Southern Methodist University

=== Native Americans ===
Prehistoric hunter-gatherer peoples were the first inhabitants, and their artifacts have been found in various areas of the county. Lipan Apache, Shawnee, and Coahuiltecan culture followed. The abandonment of Fort Duncan on March 20, 1861, during the Civil War, enabled the Indian population to gain control of the region; both American and Mexican inhabitants suffered tremendous loss of life and property. The fort was reoccupied in 1868. In early 1871, a number of Black Seminole Indians living along the border were organized into a company of scouts and brought to Fort Duncan. The last Indian raid in the county occurred in 1877. Three traders were murdered and mutilated by Lipan Apaches. The site of the incident, 8 miles (13 km) northeast of Eagle Pass, became known as Deadman's Hill.

=== Spanish explorations ===
The El Camino Real, later known as the Old San Antonio Road, that crosses the Rio Grande, begins in East Texas and crosses southern Maverick County. The trail was originally blazed by Alonso De León in 1690, and is said to have been traversed by more early Spanish explorers and settlers than any other section of the state. In 1989, the legislature authorized the Old San Antonio Road Preservation Commission to coordinate the 1991 300th anniversary of the trail's founding.

Saltillo alcade Fernando de Azcué in 1665 pursued Indians into the county. In 1675, Fernando del Bosque traversed the area near Quemado, and Franciscans with the expedition are said to have celebrated the first Mass on Texas soil. In 1688, Alonso De León followed the Camino Real across the county en route to Fort St. Louis. Domingo Terán de los Ríos, the first Governor of Spanish Texas, led an expedition through the county in 1691. Spanish Texas Governor Martín de Alarcón crossed the county in 1718 on the expedition that resulted in the founding of San Antonio. Governor of the Mexican provinces of Coahuila and Texas, Marqués de San Miguel de Aguayo, in 1720 passed through on an expedition that brought goats, 2800 horses and 6400 sheep that was the onset of Spanish ranching in Texas. Pedro de Rivera y Villalón crossed the county in 1727 as part of an expedition to inspect the frontier defenses of New Spain.

=== Early settlers ===
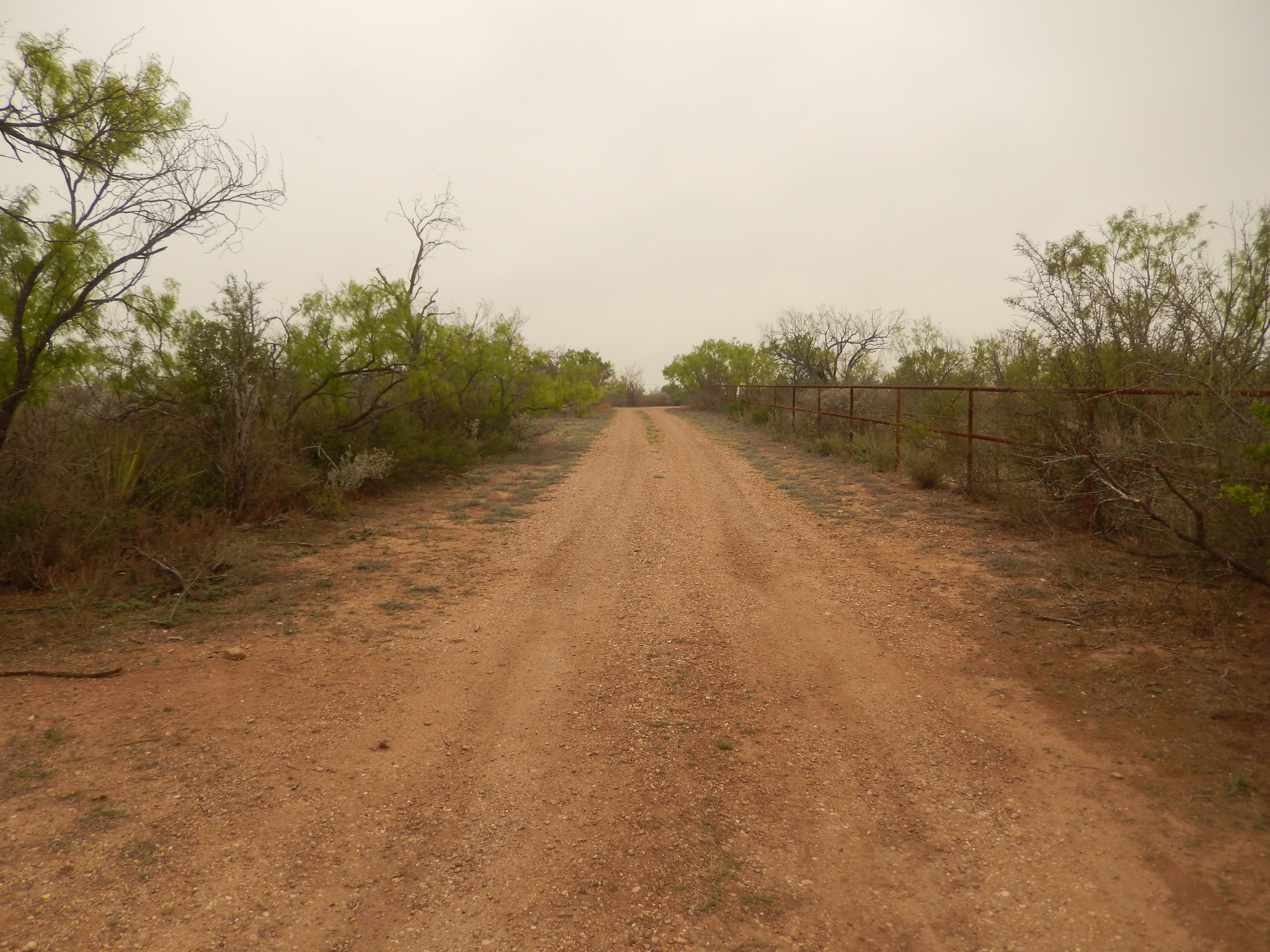
Ranch road in Maverick County

Antonio Rivas was the first known rancher on the land in 1765. The county still has a considerable ranching community.

On March 27, 1849, Capt. Sidney Burbank established Fort Duncan, previously known as Camp Eagle Pass, on a site two miles (3.2 km) north of the ford at Adjuntos Pass.

General William Leslie Cazneau, credited several years earlier with burying the Alamo casualties with full military honors, began ranching in the area around 1850. He partnered with Irish-born San Antonio banker and county settler John Twohig to lay out a plan of Eagle Pass in 1850. That same year, a Mexican garrison established Piedras Negras across the border.

Freight operator Friedrich Wilhelm Carl Groos secured a contract to haul supplies for the army at Fort Duncan. At his urging, several early settlers of Eagle Pass were emigres of the Mexican river villages and missions of San Juan Bautista, San José, Santo Domingo, San Nicolás, La Navaja, and San Isidro.

Emigres Refugio and Rita Alderete de San Miguel used the profits of their freighting business to establish a large-scale cattle, sheep, and horse ranch on Elm Creek in 1853. They were joined in ranching operations by stranded pilgrims on the California Gold Rush trail and discharged Fort Duncan soldiers. Among these was Infantry veteran Jesse Sumpter, who also worked at many odd jobs before becoming sheriff in the newly formed Maverick County.

Landscape pioneer Frederick Law Olmsted visited Eagle Pass in 1854, and noted the many slave hunters and runaway slaves residing in Piedras Negras, as well as the many saloons and gambling houses, which catered to Fort Duncan's soldiers and other unsavory characters.

In 1855, Texas Governor Elisha M. Pease authorized a raid into Mexico. An international incident was brought about by James H. Callahan and William R. Henry, whose pursuit of Lipan Apache raiders and runaway slaves into Mexico ended in the looting and torching of Piedras Negras, after an encounter with Mexican forces at La Marama on the Río Escondido.

=== County established and growth ===
Maverick County was established from Kinney County and named for Samuel A. Maverick in 1856. The county was organized some years later on September 4, 1871. The estimated population of the county in 1860 was 726. Eagle Pass voted 83–3 against secession from the Union.

Fort Duncan was occupied by Confederate troops during the Civil War. Eagle Pass was chosen as a trade depot for the Military Board of Texas. Eagle Pass was a major terminus of the Cotton Road, custom house and Confederate port of entry into Mexico 1863–65. A cotton press was installed at Piedras Negras to handle the enormous quantities coming across the Rio Grande. At the close of the Civil War, General Joseph Orville Shelby's brigade never surrendered, but hoped to continue their fight across the border. On July 4, 1865, Shelby stopped in the middle of the Rio Grande to bury the last Confederate flag to fly over his troops. To the sound of drum and bugle, he wrapped the flag around the plume of his hat, weighted it with a stone from the river bank, and lowered it into the river. Shelby's unit became known as “The Undefeated” and was used as a basis for the 1969 John Wayne-Rock Hudson film by the same name.

Saloons, gambling houses, and smuggling operations proliferated in and around Eagle Pass during Reconstruction. The infamous J. King Fisher and his followers dominated the era in the region.

Telegraph lines reached Eagle Pass in 1875. In 1880, the main line of the Galveston, Harrisburg, and San Antonio Railway was extended west from San Antonio, connecting to the Mexican Railway in Piedras Negras.

Irrigation has been vital to area farmers. In 1885, rancher Patrick W. Thomson formed the Eagle Pass Irrigation Company to construct a huge gravity-flow irrigation system to draw water from the Rio Grande. Thompson died in 1910, but his efforts came to fruition as the Maverick County Irrigation Canal system, operational by April 1932.

March 3, 1911, when Lt. Benjamin D. Foulois and Philip O. Parmalee made the first official military reconnaissance flight, looking for Army troops between Laredo and Eagle Pass, Texas, with a ground exercise in progress. In 1942, the Army Air Force built a single-engine advanced flying school 12 mi (19 km) north of Eagle Pass.

Oil and gas exploration in the county began in the 1950s, with the largest fields being the 1969 Fitzpatrick and Wipff, and the 1970 Burr.

The coal industry of Maverick County is located along a section of the Olmos Coal Formation immediately north of Eagle Pass. Mining operations developed by Dolch at Dolchburg and by the Olmos Coal, Coke, and Oil Company at Olmos were the largest coal producers in Texas around the turn of the 20th century.

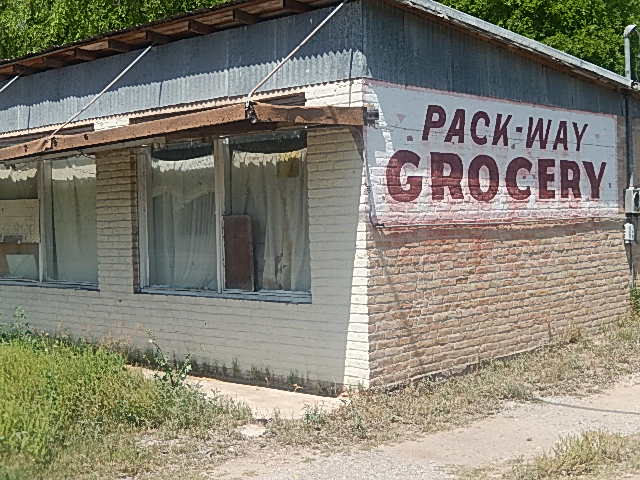
The former Pack-Way Grocery between Eagle Pass and Quemado.

Industries located in the county in 1977 included a cotton gin and two cattle feedlots with capacities of 25,000 cattle at El Indio, one at Normandy, and another between Eagle Pass and El Indio. A spinach-packing shed was at the southern edge of Eagle Pass. Industries which have located in the Eagle Pass–Maverick County area since 1977 include the Eagle Pass Manufacturing Company (a division of Hicks-Ponder, Inc) and the Williamson-Dickie Manufacturing Co, both makers of work clothing; the Reynolds Mining Corp fluorspar plant and the Tejas Barite plant; Alta-Verde Industries and Maverick Beef Producers, and the Big River Catfish Farm.

In 1982, 88 percent of all land in the county was considered farmland and ranches, but only 2 percent of the farmland was under cultivation, and most of that was irrigated. Primary crops were hay, oats, and wheat.

== Geography ==
According to the U.S. Census Bureau, the county has a total area of 1,292 square miles (3,350 km^{2}), of which 1,279 square miles (3,310 km^{2}) is land and 13 square miles (34 km^{2}) (1.0%) is water.

=== Major highways ===
- U.S. Highway 57
- U.S. Highway 277
- State Highway 131
- Loop 480
- Spur 216
- Spur 240

=== Adjacent counties and municipios ===
- Kinney County (north)
- Zavala County (east)
- Dimmit County (east)
- Uvalde County (northeast)
- Webb County (south)
- Guerrero, Coahuila, México (south)
- Jiménez, Coahuila, Mexico (west)
- Piedras Negras, Coahuila, Mexico (south)

== Demographics ==
Historical population
Census	Pop.	Note	%±
1860	726		—
1870	1,951		168.7%
1880	2,967		52.1%
1890	3,698		24.6%
1900	4,066		10.0%
1910	5,151		26.7%
1920	7,418		44.0%
1930	6,120		−17.5%
1940	10,071		64.6%
1950	12,292		22.1%
1960	14,508		18.0%
1970	18,093		24.7%
1980	31,398		73.5%
1990	36,378		15.9%
2000	47,297		30.0%
2010	54,258		14.7%
2020	57,887		6.7%
2025 (est.)	58,823	▲	1.6%
U.S. Decennial Census; 1850–2010 2010–2014

=== Racial and ethnic composition ===
Maverick County, Texas – Racial and ethnic composition Note: the US Census treats Hispanic/Latino as an ethnic category. This table excludes Latinos from the racial categories and assigns them to a separate category. Hispanics/Latinos may be of any race.
Race / Ethnicity (NH = Non-Hispanic)	Pop 1980	Pop 1990	Pop 2000	Pop 2010	Pop 2020	% 1980	% 1990	% 2000	% 2010	% 2020
White alone (NH)	2,275	1,571	1,610	1,552	1,574	7.25%	4.32%	3.40%	2.86%	2.72%
Black or African American alone (NH)	11	13	53	75	129	0.04%	0.04%	0.11%	0.14%	0.22%
Native American or Alaska Native alone (NH)	739	679	444	506	835	2.35%	1.87%	0.94%	0.93%	1.44%
Asian alone (NH)	7	51	164	140	182	0.02%	0.14%	0.35%	0.26%	0.31%
Native Hawaiian or Pacific Islander alone (NH)	x	x	0	2	4	x	x	0.00%	0.00%	0.01%
Other race alone (NH)	0	40	6	15	110	0.00%	0.11%	0.01%	0.03%	0.19%
Mixed race or Multiracial (NH)	x	x	82	54	117	x	x	0.17%	0.10%	0.20%
Hispanic or Latino (any race)	28,366	34,024	44,938	51,914	54,936	90.34%	93.53%	95.01%	95.68%	94.90%
Total	31,398	36,378	47,297	54,258	57,887	100.00%	100.00%	100.00%	100.00%	100.00%

=== 2020 census ===
As of the 2020 census, the county had a population of 57,887, 16,647 households, and 13,402 families residing in the county. The median age was 33.7 years.

29.3% of residents were under the age of 18 and 14.5% of residents were 65 years of age or older. For every 100 females there were 93.2 males, and for every 100 females age 18 and over there were 88.5 males age 18 and over.

The racial makeup of the county was 29.1% White, 0.3% Black or African American, 2.0% American Indian and Alaska Native, 0.3% Asian, <0.1% Native Hawaiian and Pacific Islander, 25.0% from some other race, and 43.2% from two or more races. Hispanic or Latino residents of any race comprised 94.9% of the population.

93.4% of residents lived in urban areas, while 6.6% lived in rural areas.

There were 18,034 households in the county, of which 44.3% had children under the age of 18 living in them. Of all households, 52.9% were married-couple households, 14.2% were households with a male householder and no spouse or partner present, and 29.0% were households with a female householder and no spouse or partner present. About 18.6% of all households were made up of individuals and 9.1% had someone living alone who was 65 years of age or older.

There were 20,072 housing units, of which 10.2% were vacant. Among occupied housing units, 67.3% were owner-occupied and 32.7% were renter-occupied. The homeowner vacancy rate was 1.5% and the rental vacancy rate was 8.5%.

=== 2000 census ===
As of the 2000 census, 47,297 people, 13,089 households, and 11,230 families resided in the county. The population density was 37 people per square mile (14 people/km^{2}). There were 14,889 housing units at an average density of 12 units per square mile (4.6/km^{2}). The racial makeup of the county was 70.89% White, 0.31% Black or African American, 1.34% Native American, 0.39% Asian, 0.04% Pacific Islander, 24.08% from other races, and 2.95% from two or more races. About 95% of the population were Hispanic or Latino of any race.

Of the 13,089 households, 51.60% had children under the age of 18 living with them, 66.50% were married couples living together, 16.00% had a female householder with no husband present, and 14.20% were not families. About 12.90% of all households were made up of individuals, and 6.60% had someone living alone who was 65 years of age or older. The average household size was 3.60 and the average family size was 3.98.

In the county, the population was distributed as 36.90% under the age of 18, 9.20% from 18 to 24, 26.70% from 25 to 44, 17.70% from 45 to 64, and 9.50% who were 65 years of age or older. The median age was 28 years. For every 100 females, there were 91.90 males. For every 100 females age 18 and over, there were 86.40 males.

The median income for a household in the county was $21,232, and for a family was $23,614. Males had a median income of $20,956 versus $15,662 for females. The per capita income for the county was $8,758. About 34.80% of the population and 32.00% of families were below the poverty line. Of the total population, 40.60% of those under the age of 18 and 40.90% of those 65 and older were living below the poverty line. Based on per capita income, Maverick County is one of the poorest counties in the United States.

According to the 2000 census, Maverick County has the nation's highest percentage of people who speak Spanish at home, at 91%.

== Politics ==
Like most of heavily Hispanic South Texas, Maverick County has leaned towards the Democratic Party. In 1972, Maverick County was one of only eight counties in Texas where George McGovern received a majority of the vote. The county held a very long Democratic streak; until 2024, the last Republican to carry the county was Herbert Hoover in 1928.

In recent times, it cast a majority of its votes for John Kerry in 2004. President George W. Bush received 4,025 votes to Kerry's 5,948. In 2008, it cast a higher majority of 8,554 votes for Barack Obama. In 2020, however, Maverick County joined the rest of South Texas in swinging heavily towards the Republican Party. President Donald Trump managed to put up nearly 45% of the vote and narrow the margin to less than 10%, the Republican Party's best result in the county since President Richard Nixon's landslide victory in 1972.

The 2024 election continued this trend, in which the county flipped Republican by a large margin, casting nearly 59% of its vote for Trump. Maverick had the largest shift to Trump out of any county in the country in the 2024 election, even voting to the right of Texas as a whole. Overall, it shifted to the right from 2012 to 2024 by 77 percentage points, representing the second-furthest such rightward shift for any county in the country, surpassed only by Starr County's 89-point shift.

United States presidential election results for Maverick County, Texas
Year	Republican		Democratic		Third party(ies)	
Year	No.	%	No.	%	No.	%
1912	143	35.05%	186	45.59%	79	19.36%
1916	246	55.78%	192	43.54%	3	0.68%
1920	296	62.32%	173	36.42%	6	1.26%
1924	261	53.16%	199	40.53%	31	6.31%
1928	311	63.34%	180	36.66%	0	0.00%
1932	199	18.84%	847	80.21%	10	0.95%
1936	166	15.15%	890	81.20%	40	3.65%
1940	166	15.89%	875	83.73%	4	0.38%
1944	302	26.92%	787	70.14%	33	2.94%
1948	270	27.16%	695	69.92%	29	2.92%
1952	839	46.56%	962	53.39%	1	0.06%
1956	721	46.22%	820	52.56%	19	1.22%
1960	639	29.87%	1,498	70.03%	2	0.09%
1964	545	20.48%	2,113	79.41%	3	0.11%
1968	771	30.77%	1,570	62.65%	165	6.58%
1972	1,477	46.20%	1,710	53.49%	10	0.31%
1976	924	24.30%	2,840	74.70%	38	1.00%
1980	1,370	31.37%	2,932	67.14%	65	1.49%
1984	1,783	36.68%	3,063	63.01%	15	0.31%
1988	1,592	26.52%	4,395	73.21%	16	0.27%
1992	2,002	27.28%	4,540	61.86%	797	10.86%
1996	1,050	15.94%	5,307	80.58%	229	3.48%
2000	3,143	34.06%	5,995	64.96%	91	0.99%
2004	4,025	40.11%	5,948	59.28%	61	0.61%
2008	2,316	21.17%	8,554	78.20%	69	0.63%
2012	2,171	20.55%	8,303	78.60%	89	0.84%
2016	2,816	20.72%	10,397	76.52%	375	2.76%
2020	6,881	44.84%	8,332	54.29%	133	0.87%
2024	9,285	58.97%	6,373	40.48%	87	0.55%

United States Senate election results for Maverick County, Texas1
Year	Republican		Democratic		Third party(ies)	
Year	No.	%	No.	%	No.	%
2024	7,287	49.46%	6,859	46.56%	586	3.98%

United States Senate election results for Maverick County, Texas2
Year	Republican		Democratic		Third party(ies)	
Year	No.	%	No.	%	No.	%
2020	5,708	39.95%	7,956	55.68%	625	4.37%

Texas Gubernatorial election results for Maverick County
Year	Republican		Democratic		Third party(ies)	
Year	No.	%	No.	%	No.	%
2022	3,862	40.30%	5,555	57.97%	166	1.73%

The county is located in Texas Senate District 19, which is represented by Democrat Roland Gutierrez in the Texas Senate. As part of the 74th district of the Texas House of Representatives, it is represented by Democrat Eddie Morales. In the United States House of Representatives, it is part of Texas's 23rd congressional district, which has a Cook Partisan Voting Index of R+7 and was represented by Republican Tony Gonzales before his resignation, the district is currently vacant.

== Education ==
All of Maverick County is served by the Eagle Pass Independent School District.

According to the Texas Education Code, Southwest Texas Junior College is the county's designated community college.

Sul Ross State University also serves this community through its Eagle Pass Campus.

== Communities ==
=== City ===
- Eagle Pass (county seat)

=== Census-designated places ===
- Chula Vista
- Eidson Road
- El Indio
- Elm Creek
- Fabrica
- Las Quintas Fronterizas
- Normandy
- Quemado
- Radar Base
- Rosita
- Seco Mines
- Siesta Acres

== See also ==
- National Register of Historic Places listings in Maverick County, Texas
- Recorded Texas Historic Landmarks in Maverick County
