= Santuc, South Carolina =

Unincorporated community in South Carolina, US

Coordinates: 34°38′03.4″N 81°31′33.5″W

Santuc is an unincorporated community in Union County, South Carolina, United States.

Cane Creek Church is a historic congregation in Santuc. The Union County Dragway is outside of Santuc.

It has had a volunteer fire department for decades since its formation on August 5, 1968.

Dan Jenkins, a 24-year-old construction gang laborer, was lynched and shot hundreds of times on June 17, 1930, in Santuc. He had been accused of an attempted assault on two sisters. The National Guard arrived twenty minutes after the lynching.

The community is noted in a comptroller's document from 1900. Mansions were built in the area of Santuc and Fish Dam.

In 1933, Santuc was described as "a crossroads trading center with scarcely a dozen houses in it, a railroad depot, three stores, and two filling stations."

A former slave, Eison Lyles, who was born in Santuc, was interviewed as part of a Works Project Administration effort.

The Santuc Series is a recognized series of layered soils consisting of five main soil types in seven main layers.

The Seven Springs House (1810) was photographed in Santuc and is part of the University of South Carolina's digital collection.

== Notable residents ==
- Thomas Bothwell Jeter was born in Santuc
- Wallace Leo Jenkins was born in Santuc
