= Quemado, Texas =

- CDP
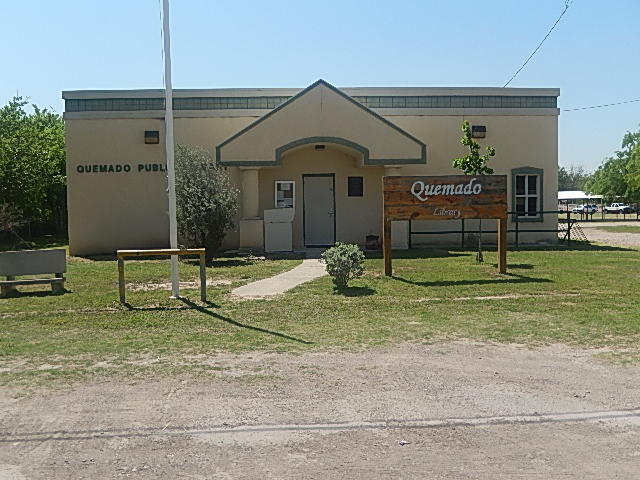
- The Quemado Library

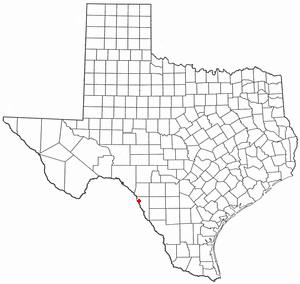
- Location of Quemado, Texas

- Coordinates: 28°56′51″N 100°37′27″W
- Country: United States
- State: Texas
- County: Maverick

Area
  - Total: 0.12 sq mi (0.3 km^{2})
  - Land: 0.12 sq mi (0.3 km^{2})
  - Water: 0 sq mi (0.0 km^{2})
- Elevation: 784 ft (239 m)

Population (2020)
  - Total: 162
  - Density: 1,400/sq mi (540/km^{2})
- Time zone: UTC-6 (Central (CST))
  - Summer (DST): UTC-5 (CDT)
- ZIP code: 78877
- Area code: 830
- FIPS code: 48-60092
- GNIS feature ID: 1365897

Quemado is a census-designated place (CDP) in Maverick County, Texas, United States. As of the 2020 census, Quemado had a population of 162.

== Geography ==
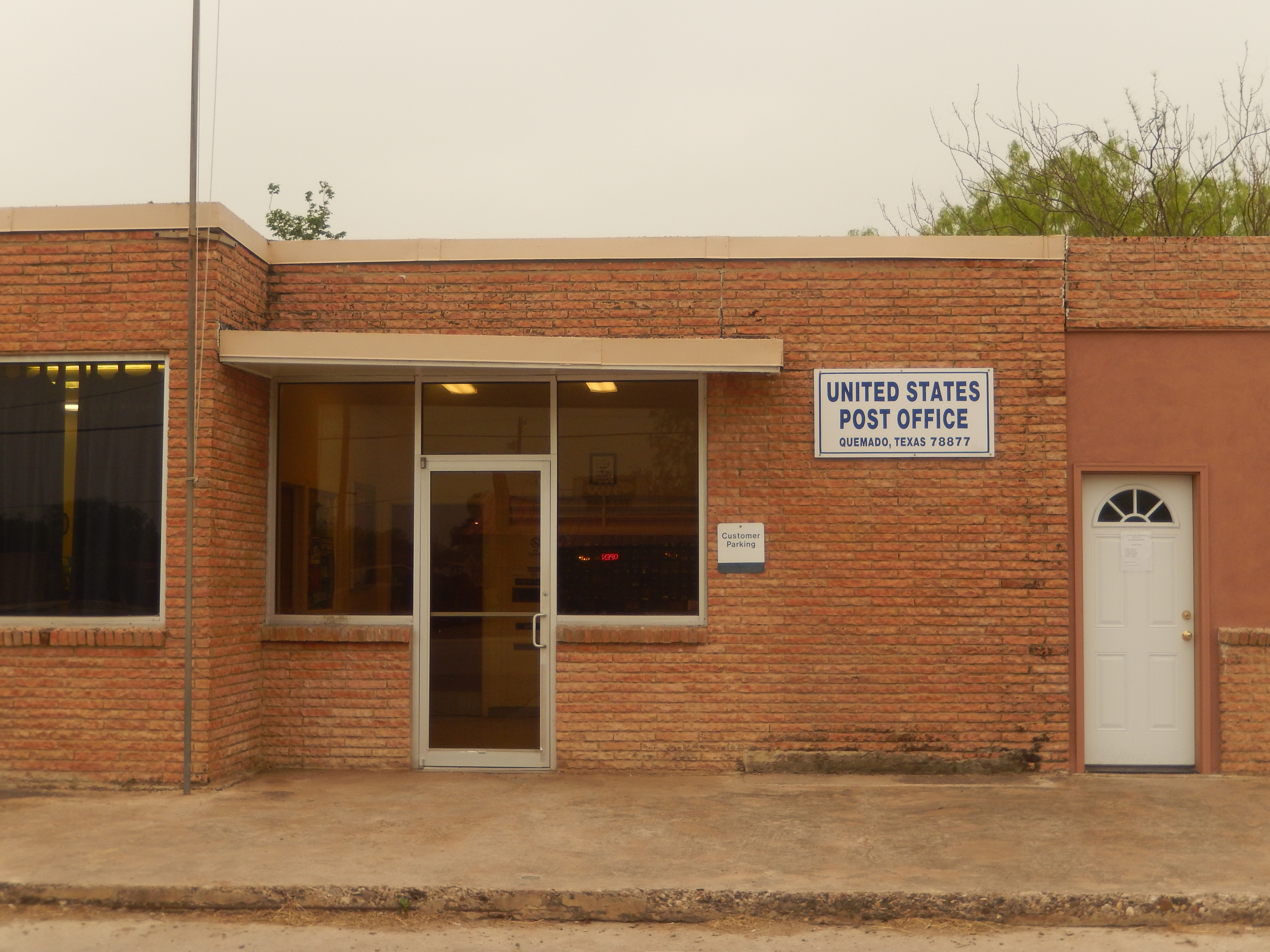
U.S. Post Office on U.S. Route 277 in Quemado

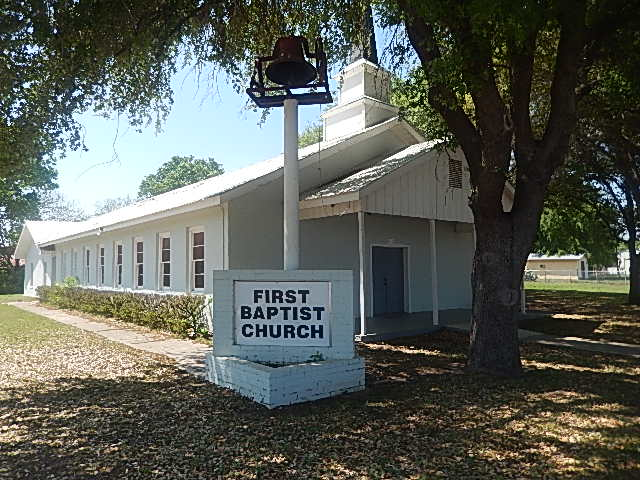
First Baptist Church of Quemado

According to the United States Census Bureau, the CDP has a total area of 64 acres (26 ha), all land.

== Demographics ==
Historical population
Census	Pop.	Note	%±
2000	243		—
2010	230		−5.3%
2020	162		−29.6%
U.S. Decennial Census; 1850–1900 1910; 1920 1930 1940; 1950 1960 1970; 1980 1990 2000; 2010

Quemado first appeared as a census designated place in the 2000 U.S. census.

=== 2020 census ===
Quemado CDP, Texas – Racial and ethnic composition Note: the US Census treats Hispanic/Latino as an ethnic category. This table excludes Latinos from the racial categories and assigns them to a separate category. Hispanics/Latinos may be of any race.
Race / Ethnicity (NH = Non-Hispanic)	Pop 2000	Pop 2010	Pop 2020	% 2000	% 2010	% 2020
White alone (NH)	24	15	10	9.88%	6.52%	6.17%
Black or African American alone (NH)	6	0	1	2.47%	0.00%	0.62%
Native American or Alaska Native alone (NH)	0	0	0	0.00%	0.00%	0.00%
Asian alone (NH)	0	0	0	0.00%	0.00%	0.00%
Native Hawaiian or Pacific Islander alone (NH)	0	0	0	0.00%	0.00%	0.00%
Other Race alone (NH)	0	0	0	0.00%	0.00%	0.00%
Mixed race or Multiracial (NH)	0	0	2	0.00%	0.00%	1.23%
Hispanic or Latino (any race)	213	215	149	87.65%	93.48%	91.98%
Total	243	230	162	100.00%	100.00%	100.00%

As of the 2020 United States census, there were 162 people, 41 households, and 41 families residing in the CDP.

=== 2000 census ===
As of the census of 2000, 243 people, 81 households, and 64 families were residing in the CDP. The population density was 2,053.3 people/sq mi (781.9/km^{2}). The 96 housing units averaged 811.2/sq mi (308.9/km^{2}). The racial makeup of the CDP was 53.09% White, 2.47% African American, 42.39% from other races, and 2.06% from two or more races. Hispanics or Latinos of any race were 87.65% of the population.

Of the 81 households, 40.7% had children under the age of 18 living with them, 66.7% were married couples living together, 11.1% had a female householder with no husband present, and 19.8% were not families. About 16.0% of all households were made up of individuals, and 9.9% had someone living alone who was 65 or older. The average household size was 3.00, and the average family size was 3.42.

In the CDP, the age distribution was 28.0% under 18, 7.8% from 18 to 24, 23.9% from 25 to 44, 21.4% from 45 to 64, and 18.9% who were 65 or older. The median age was 38 years. For every 100 females, there were 96.0 males. For every 100 females age 18 and over, there were 94.4 males.

The median income for a household in the CDP was $11,576, and for a family was $11,957. Males had a median income of $11,818 versus $25,000 for females. The per capita income for the CDP was $7,099. About 48.6% of families and 51.7% of the population were below the poverty line, including 50.9% of those under the age of eighteen and 33.3% of those 65 or over.

== Education ==
Quemado is served by the Eagle Pass Independent School District.
