= Fred, Texas =

Fred
- Unincorporated community
- Frederick
- Location within the state of Texas Fred (the United States)
- Coordinates: 30°34′36″N 94°10′35″W
- Country: United States
- State: Texas
- County: Tyler
- Elevation: 135 ft (41 m)
- Time zone: UTC-6 (Central (CST))
  - Summer (DST): UTC-5 (CDT)
- ZIP code: 77616
- Area code: 409
- GNIS feature ID: 1357699

Fred is an unincorporated community in southeastern Tyler County, Texas, United States.

Fred is approximately 40 miles north of Beaumont and is located in the Big Thicket.
