= Eagle Pass Independent School District =

School district in Texas, United States

Eagle Pass Independent School District is a public school district based in Eagle Pass, Texas (USA). The district's boundaries parallel that of Maverick County.

In 2009, the school district was rated "recognized" by the Texas Education Agency.

== Schools ==
=== High schools ===
- Eagle Pass High School
- CC Winn High School

=== Middle schools ===
- Grades 7-8
  - Eagle Pass Junior High School
  - Memorial Junior High School

=== Elementary schools ===
- Grades 1-6
  - Benavides Heights Elementary School
  - Dena Kelso Graves Elementary School
  - Henry B. Gonzalez Elementary School
  - Liberty Elementary School
    - 2008 National Blue Ribbon School
  - Maude Mae Kirchner Elementary School
  - Nellie Mae Glass Elementary School
  - Pete Gallego Elementary School
  - Ray H. Darr Elementary School
  - Rosita Valley Elementary School
  - Sam Houston Elementary School
  - San Luis Elementary School
  - Seco Mines Elementary School
  - Graves Elementary School
- Grades PK-K
  - Early Childhood Center
  - Erna Kennedy Hall Elementary School
  - Language Development Center
  - Rosita Valley Literacy Academy
