= 2017 Montana wildfires =

Wildfires in Montana

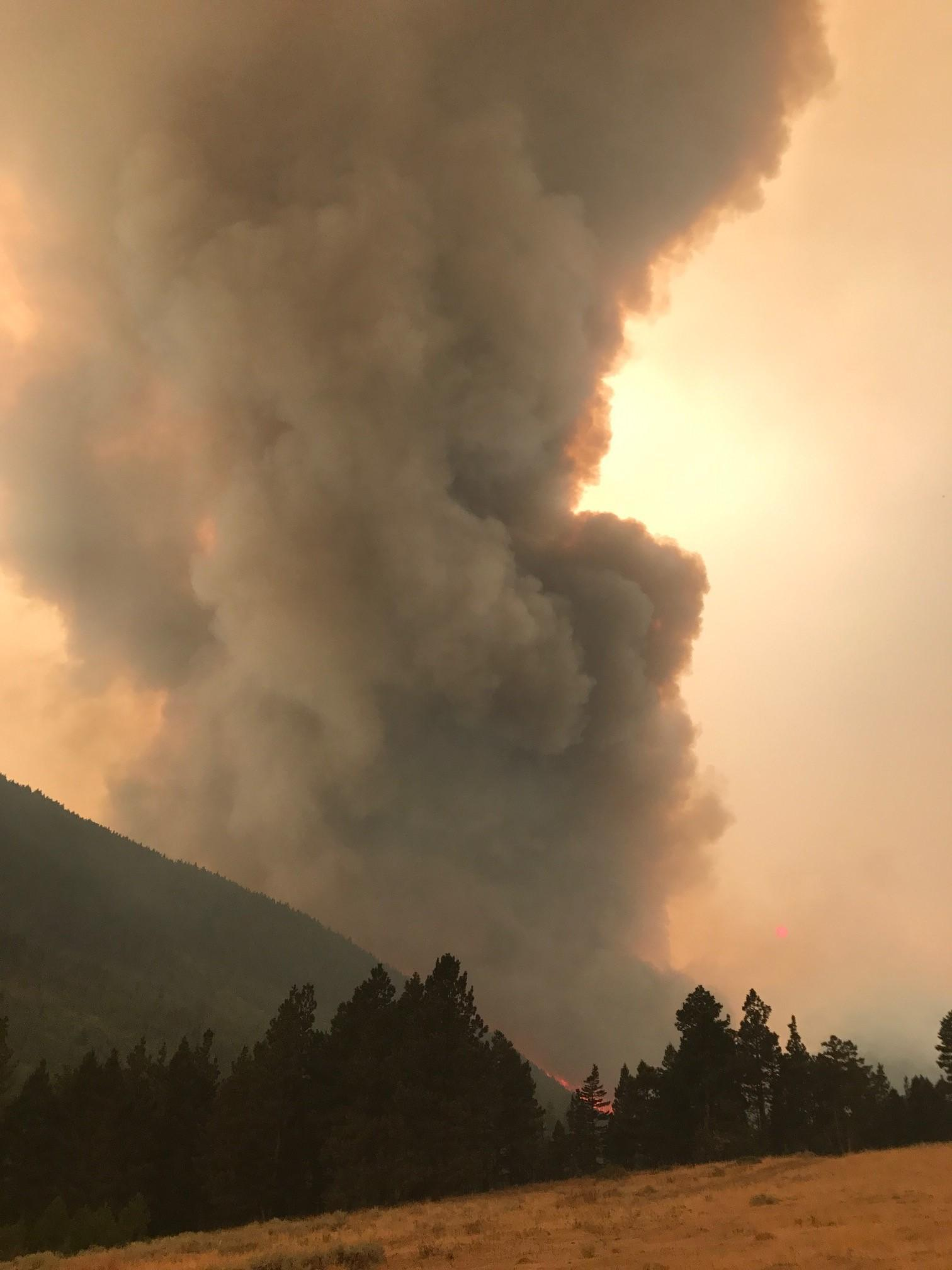
- The Alice Creek Fire on August 28, 2017
- Date: June – September, 2017

Statistics
- Total area: 438,000 acres (177,000 ha) (early September)

Impacts
- Deaths: 2

The 2017 Montana wildfires were a series of wildfires that burned over the course of 2017.

== Overview ==
The 2017 fire season in Montana was exacerbated by drought conditions and as of September 7, 2017, there were 21 large, active fires that had consumed over 438,000 acres (177,000 ha). By September 20, after rain and snow had significantly slowed most fire growth, the overall burned acreage in Montana was estimated at 1,295,959 acres (524,456 ha).

Two fires alone burned over 100,000 acres (40,000 ha) each. The first was the Lodgepole Complex Fire in eastern Montana, which started on July 19 and burned over 270,000 acres (110,000 ha) before it was declared 93% contained two weeks later. The second was the Rice Ridge Fire, which was identified as the nation's top wildfire priority, after it rapidly expanded from about 40,000 acres (16,000 ha) to over 100,000 acres (40,000 ha) on September 3, 2017. Approximately 48 fires were burning as of September 12, 2017, though some were under 1,000 acres (400 ha). The fire season began a month earlier than usual and months of June through August were the hottest and driest on record for Montana. On July 29, Montana had 11.87 percent of its total land listed as in exceptional drought, the largest percentage in the nation. In mid September, the eastern portion of the Going-to-the-Sun Road in Glacier National Park was closed by ice and snow in the Rockies, while simultaneously the western portion was closed due to wildfires.

Federal disaster assistance was requested by Governor Steve Bullock and FEMA granted funds for the Rice Ridge Fire near Seeley Lake, Montana, Alice Creek Fire near Lincoln, Montana, West Fork Fire near Libby, Montana, Highway 200 Complex in Sanders County, Montana and the Moose Peak Fire. Over $280 million had been spent on firefighting by early August. A number of areas were subjected to evacuation orders, including most of the town of Seeley Lake. By September 18, 2017, rain and snow had significantly slowed most fires, except for parts of far northwestern Montana, near Libby, where the West Fork Fire required some evacuation orders to remain in effect.

== List of fires ==
Major fires of 2017 that consumed over 1,000 acres (400 ha) include the following (as of September 13, 2017):

Over 100,000 acres (40,000 ha)

- Lodgepole Complex Fire, public and private land 52 miles WNW of Jordan, 270,723 acres (109,558 ha)
- Rice Ridge Fire, Lolo National Forest, near Seeley Lake, Montana, 160,183 acres (64,824 ha)

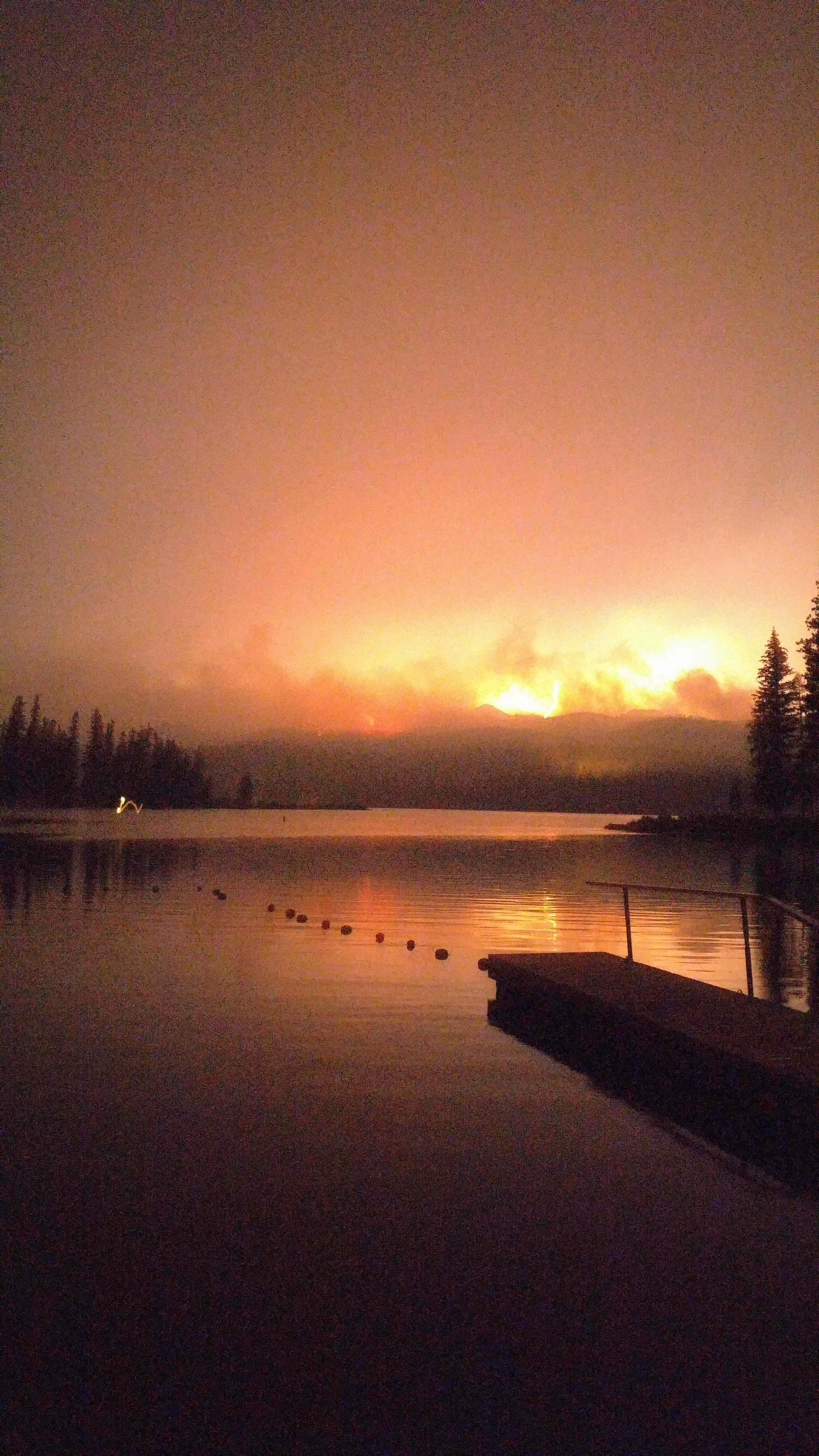
The Rice Ridge Fire became the nation's number one fire priority in early September when it blew up to cover over 100,000 acres (40,000 ha).

Over 50,000 acres (20,000 ha)

- Meyers Fire, Beaverhead National Forest/Deerlodge National Forest, 62,034 acres (25,104 ha)
- Lolo Peak Fire, Lolo National Forest, 53,902 acres (21,813 ha)

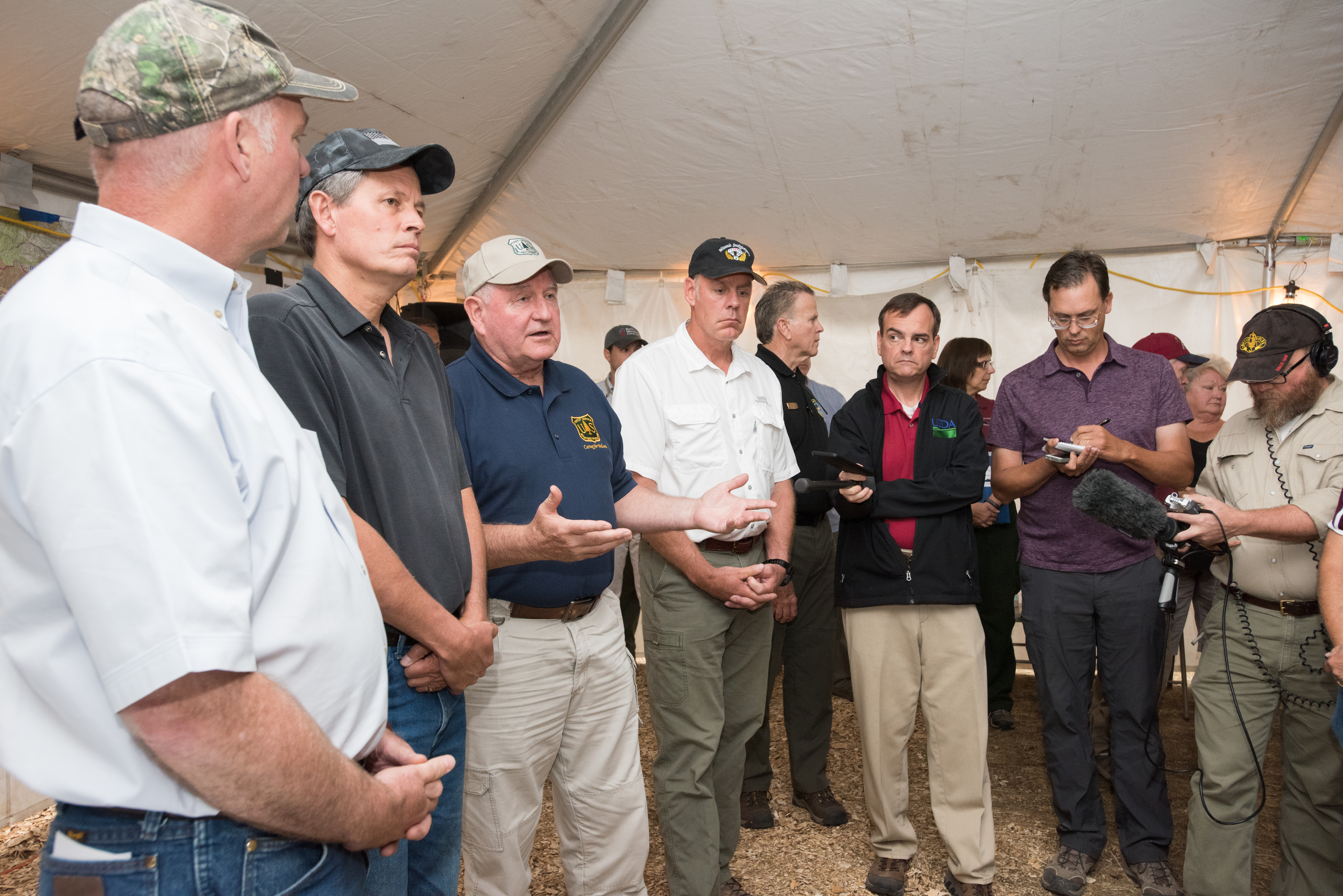
At an interagency and departmental briefing on Montana fires: (from left) U.S. Congressman Greg Gianforte, U.S. Senator Steve Daines, Secretary of Agriculture Sonny Perdue and Secretary of Interior Ryan Zinke.

Over 20,000 acres (8,100 ha)

- Sapphire Complex Fire, Lolo National Forest, 43,733 acres (17,698 ha)
- Little Hogback Fire, Lolo National Forest, 29,654 acres (12,001 ha)
- Alice Creek Fire, Helena National Forest – Lewis and Clark National Forest, 29,252 acres (11,838 ha)
- Tongue River Complex Fire, Custer National Forest/Gallatin National Forest, 28,957 acres (11,718 ha)
- Liberty Fire, Flathead Indian Reservation, 28,689 acres (11,610 ha)
- Sunrise Fire, Lolo National Forest, 26,310 acres (10,650 ha)
- Highway 200 Complex Fire, Lolo National Forest/Kootenai National Forest, near Plains and Thompson Falls, Montana 48,417 acres (19,594 ha)
- Caribou Fire, near Eureka, Montana, Kootenai National Forest, 24,753 acres (10,017 ha)
- East Fork Fire, state land in Bears Paw Mountains, south of Havre, Montana, 21,896 acres (8,861 ha)
- Strawberry Fire, near Dupuyer, Montana, Flathead National Forest, 20,894 acres (8,456 ha)
- Scalp Fire, Flathead National Forest, 20,810 acres (8,420 ha)
- West Fork Fire, Kootenai National Forest, 20,072 acres (8,123 ha)

Over 10,000 acres (4,000 ha)

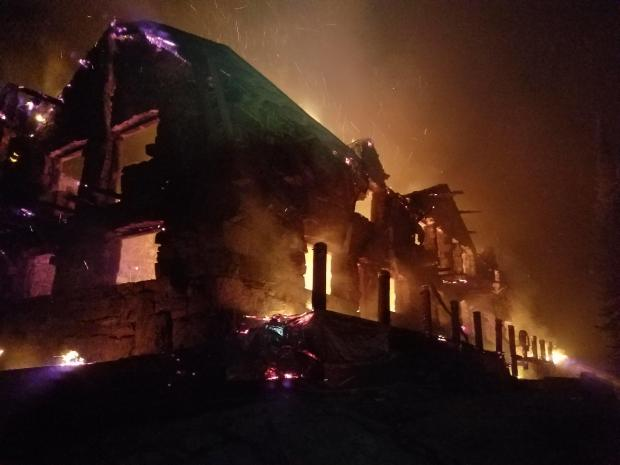
The historic Sperry Chalet was nearly destroyed by the Sprague Fire

- Park Creek Fire, Helena National Forest/Lewis and Clark National Forest, 18,000 acres (7,300 ha)
- Sprague Fire, Glacier National Park, 16,790 acres (6,790 ha)
- Moose Peak Fire, Kootenai National Forest, 13,903 acres (5,626 ha)
- Gibralter Ridge Fire, Kootenai National Forest, 12,938 acres (5,236 ha)
- July Fire, public and private land near Zortman, 11,699 acres (4,734 ha)
- Whetstone Ridge Fire, Beaverhead National Forest/Deerlodge National Forest, 11,593 acres (4,692 ha)
- Reef Fire, Bob Marshall Wilderness, Flathead National Forest, 10,658 acres (4,313 ha)
- Crucifixion Creek Fire, near Heart Butte, Montana, in the Badger-Two Medicine area, Helena National Forest/Lewis and Clark National Forest, 11,008 acres (4,455 ha)

Over 1,000 acres (400 ha)

- Goat Creek Fire, Lolo National Forest, 8,323 acres (3,368 ha)
- Crying Fire, public and private land 50 miles north of Winnett, 7,295 acres (2,952 ha)
- Blacktail Fire, Lewis and Clark National Forest, 5,351 acres (2,165 ha)
- Green Ridge Complex Fire, Bitterroot National Forest, 4,769 acres (1,930 ha)
- Weasel Fire, Kootenai National Forest, 3,925 acres (1,588 ha)
- Monahan Fire, Lolo National Forest, 3,613 acres (1,462 ha)
- Blue Ridge Complex Fire, public and private land 39 miles NW of Jordan, 3,034 acres (1,228 ha)
- Buffalo Fire, public and private land 31 miles SW of Broadus, 3,020 acres (1,220 ha)
- Adair Peak Fire, Glacier National Park, 4,034 acres (1,633 ha)
- Conrow Fire, Beaverhead National Forest/Deerlodge National Forest, 2,741 acres (1,109 ha)
- Yooper Fire, SW Rural Culbertson/Richland County area, private and public land, 7,816 acres (3,163 ha)
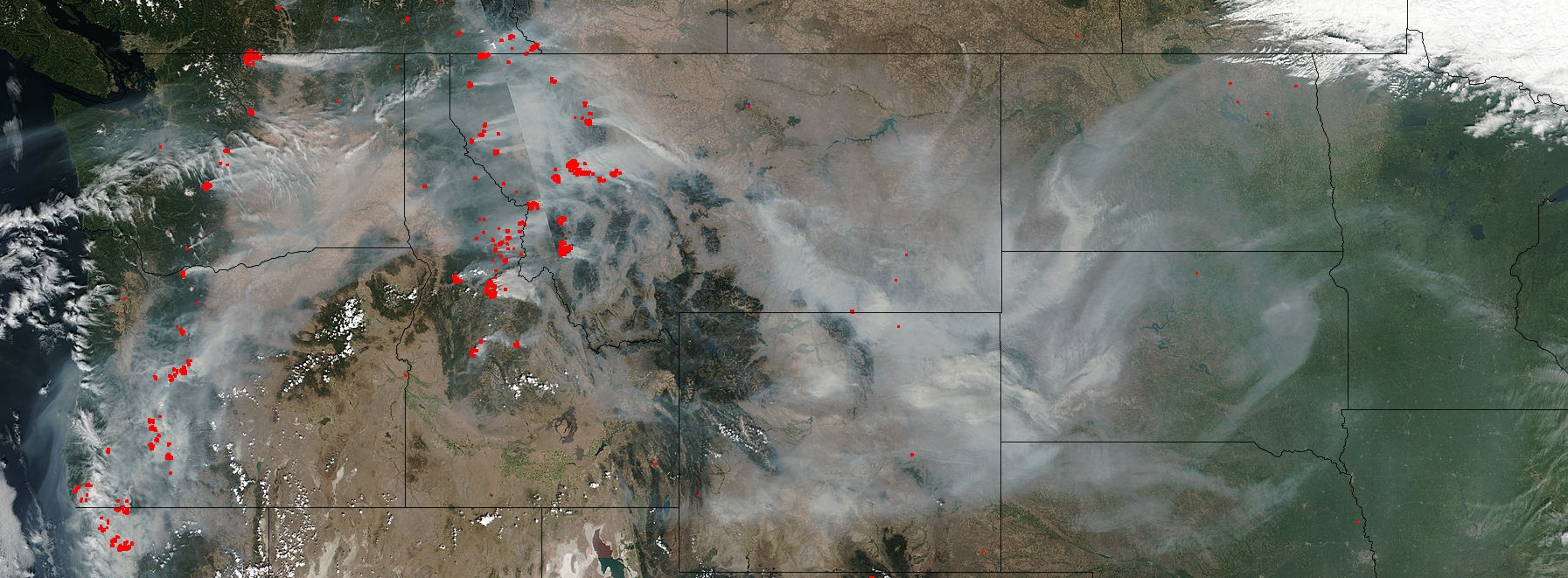
NASA satellite image from September 5, 2017, showing fires in the Cascades and Rockies and smoke as far east as the Great Lakes
