= Wildfires in 2017 =

Wildfire season in 2017

2017 wildfire season
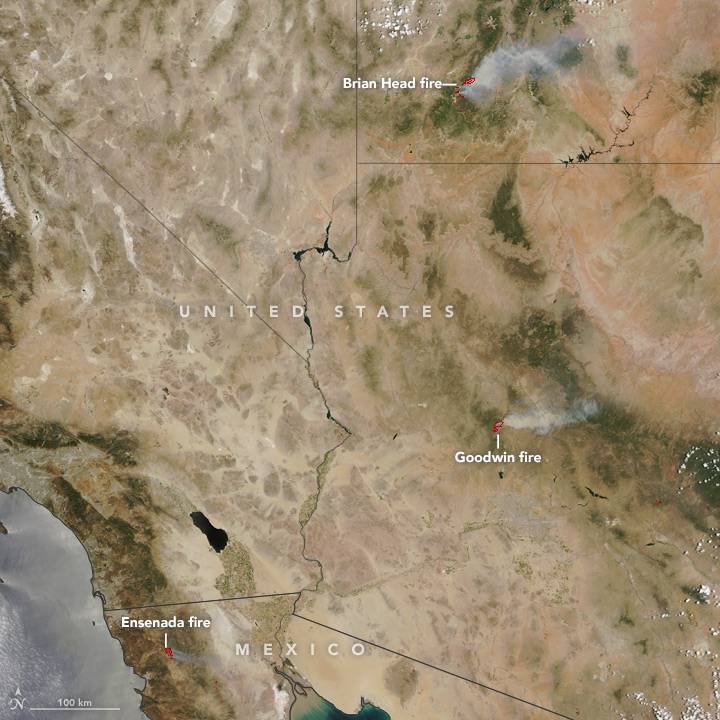
- Wildfires burning throughout the Southwestern U.S. (picture taken on June 27)
- Date: January–December 2017

The 2017 wildfire season involved wildfires on multiple continents. On Greenland, which is mostly covered by ice and permafrost, multiple fires occurred in melted peat bogs, described as "unusual, and possibly unprecedented". Popular media asked whether the wildfires were related to global warming. Research published by NASA states "climate change has increased fire risk in many regions", but caused "greater severity in the colder latitudes" where boreal and temperate forests exist, and scholars have described "a warm weather fluctuation that has become more frequent in recent decades" related to wildfires, without naming any particular event as being directly caused by global warming.

Below is a partial list of articles on wildfires from around the world in the year 2017.

== Africa ==
- 2017 Knysna fires, South Africa

== Asia ==
- 2017 Southeast Asian haze

== Europe ==
Wildfires in Croatia seen from satellite

Depopulation of rural areas of Europe was also described as contributing to fires in Portugal and France.

The wildfires near the Calampiso seaside resort west of Palermo, forced the evacuation by boat of more than 700 tourists on July 12. More bushfires broke out across southern Italy and Sicily, as temperatures hit 40 °C in the week leading up to July 13. About 23 wildfires raged in southern Italy on Wednesday, including on the slopes of Mount Vesuvius near Naples. Two were north of Mount Etna, in the suburbs of Sicilian city of Catania on the 13th. Italy's environment minister said a man had been arrested on suspicion of arson and Gian Luca Galletti was quoted as saying in Italian media|: “If someone set fire to Vesuvius, I want to see them in jail for 15 years,” on July 13. 150 hectares of pine forest were destroyed in a blaze in Sicily a month earlier.

Some 15 wildfires were reported in Albania on August 5 and others occurred elsewhere in the Balkans and a few other parts of Southern Europe.

- June 2017 Portugal wildfires
- October 2017 Iberian wildfires
- France's Mediterranean coast including Côte d'Azur, and Corsica

== North America ==
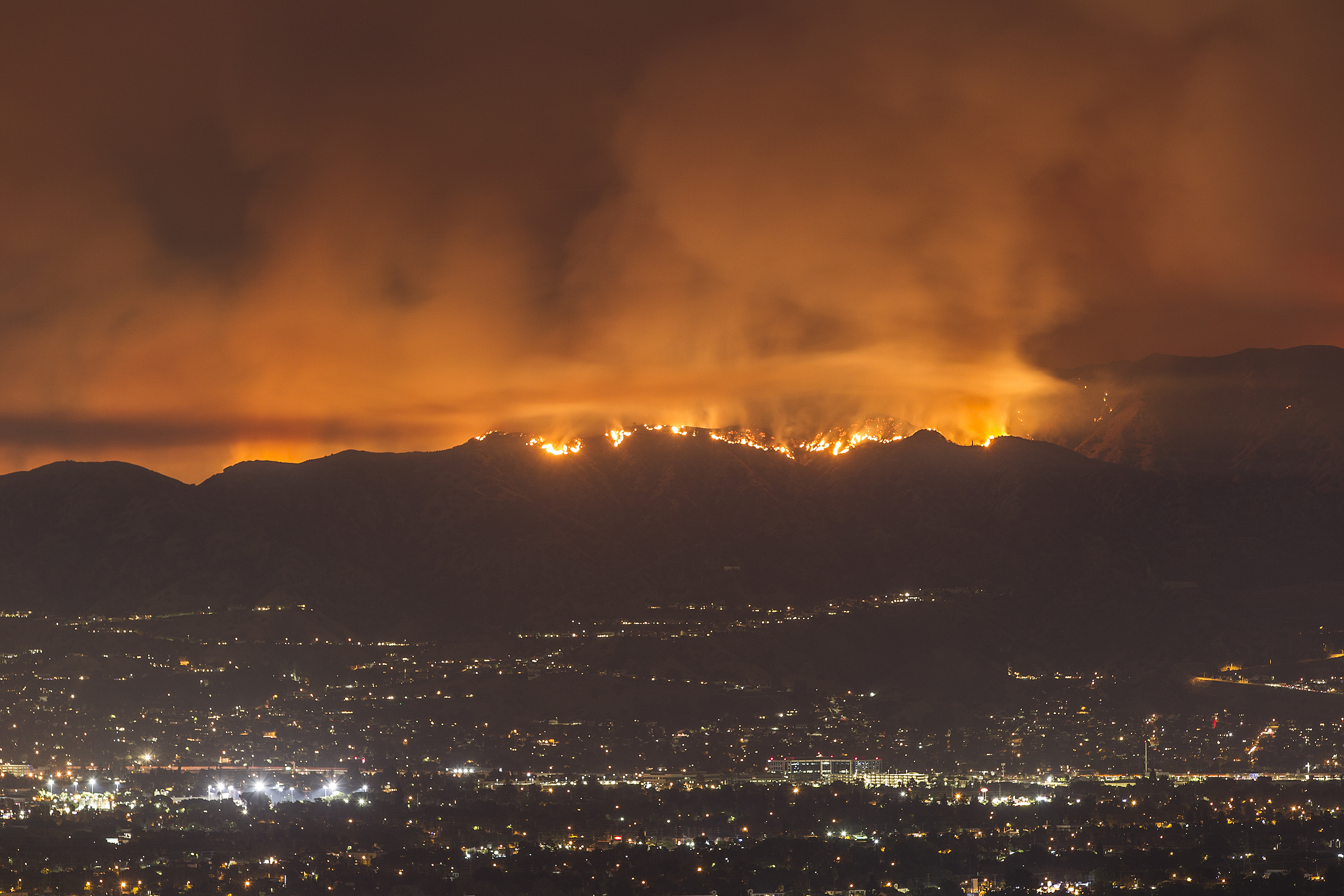
The La Tuna Fire was the largest in Los Angeles history.

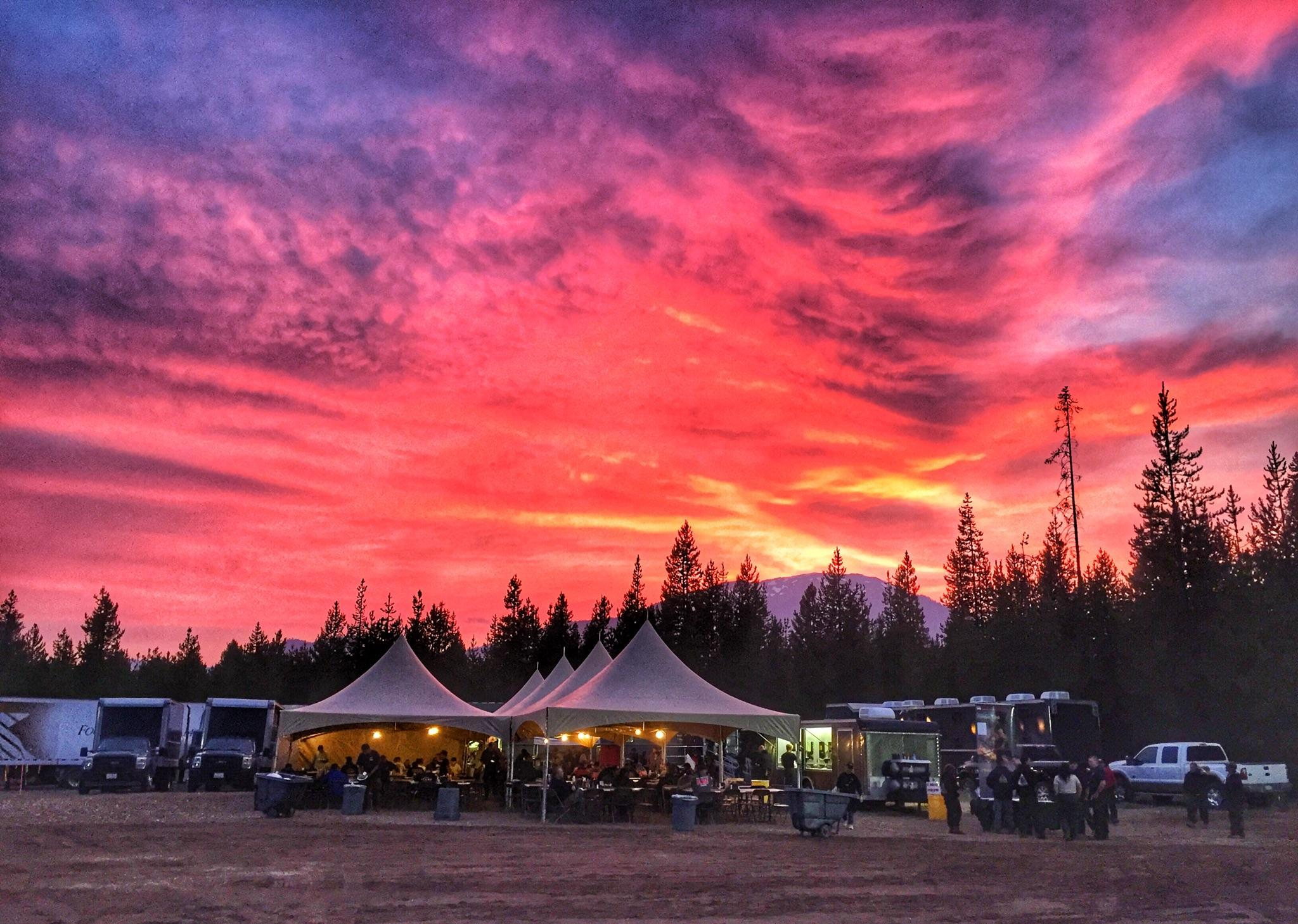
Oregon wildfires brought vibrantly hued sunsets (behind fire camp).

2017 was the most expensive firefighting year on record for the US Forest Service with over $2 billion spent. Record setting fires included the Lodgepole Complex Fire, the nation's largest that year; the La Tuna Fire, which was the largest in Los Angeles history; and the 2017 British Columbia wildfires, worst in the history of the province. The western U.S., as of October, witnessed about 50,000 wildfires, with more than 3.4 million hectares burned. In Canada, as of August, 7.4 million acres had burned, and British Columbia recorded its worst year for land burned since 1958. The 2017 California wildfires were the most destructive on record with over $9 billion in insurance claims from the October fires and expected over $20 billion more for December's fires.

- 2017 British Columbia wildfires, Canada
- 2017 California wildfires
- 2017 Chile wildfires
- 2017 Montana wildfires
- 2017 Oregon wildfires
- 2017 Washington wildfires
- Bearskin Fire, Idaho, United States
- Highline Fire, Idaho, United States
- Goodwin Fire, Arizona, United States
- Tank Hollow Fire, Utah, United States

== Oceania ==
- 2016–17 Australian bushfire season
- 2017 Port Hills fires, New Zealand
