= Travelers' Rest (Lolo, Montana) =

- Traveler's Rest (Montana)
- U.S. National Register of Historic Places
- U.S. National Historic Landmark
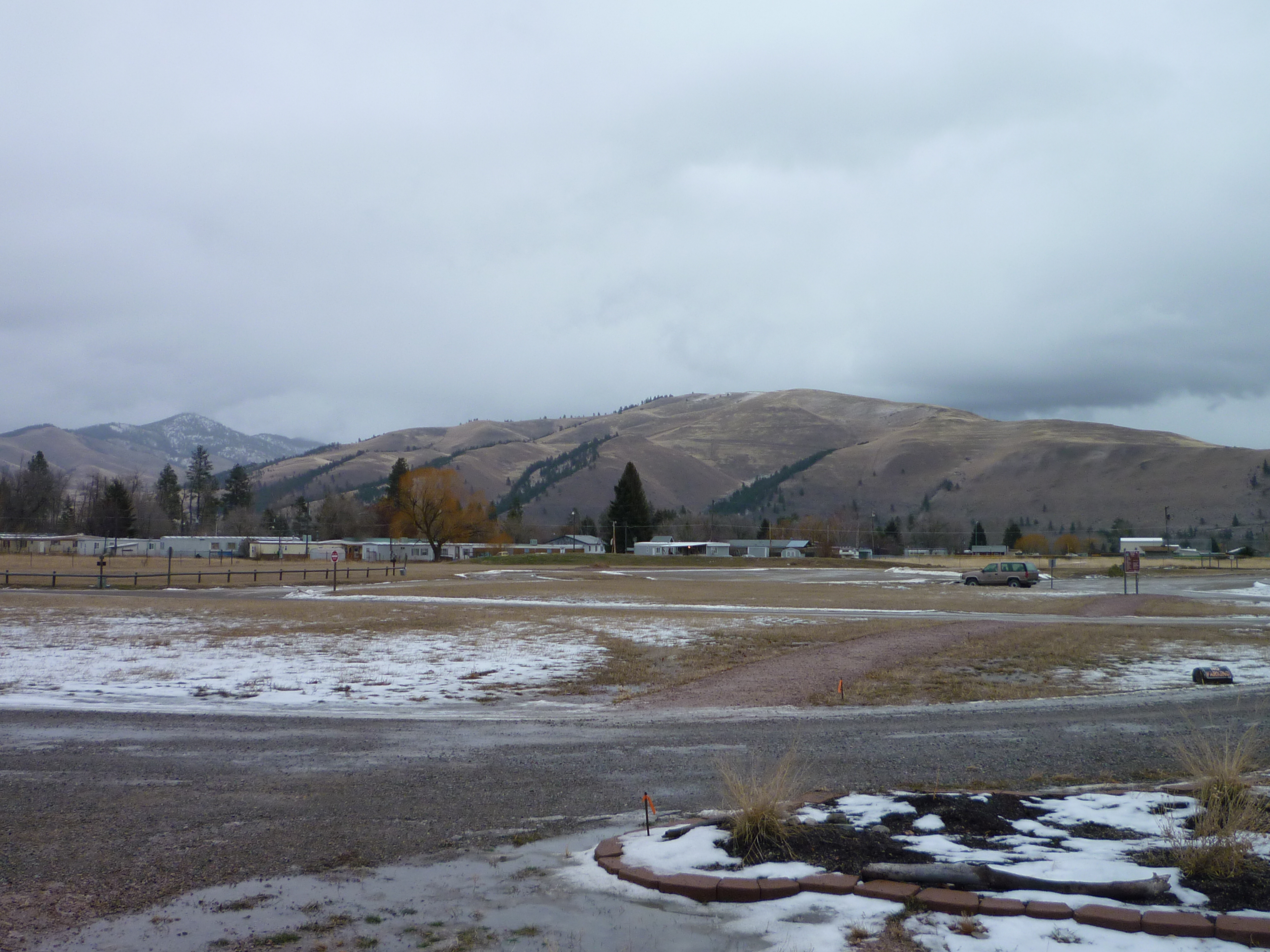
- Countryside at Travelers Rest

- Location within Montana Location within the United States
- Nearest city: Lolo, Montana
- Coordinates: 46°44′20″N 114°04′50″W
- Built: 1805
- Website: Official website
- NRHP reference No.: 66000437

Significant dates
- Added to NRHP: October 15, 1966
- Designated NHL: October 9, 1960

Travelers' Rest was a stopping point of the Lewis and Clark Expedition, located about one mile south of Lolo, Montana. The expedition stopped from September 9 to September 11, 1805, before crossing the Bitterroot Mountains, and again on the return trip from June 30 to July 3, 1806. Travelers' Rest is at the eastern end of the Lolo Trail. It was declared a National Historic Landmark in 1960 and added to the National Register of Historic Places in 1966. It is the only National Historic Landmark to have been declared without a precise location. The boundaries were revised following the submission of a detailed site nomination in 1978 by Blanche Higgins Schroer of the National Park Service, assisted by the Montana State Historic Preservation Office. The submission nominated 700 acres, of which all was east of Hwy 93.

Today, the historical landmark is located on the by the 51-acre (21 ha) Travelers' Rest State Park, which is operated by the Montana Department of Fish, Wildlife and Parks. Significant archeological findings unearthed in 2002 make this the only site on the Lewis and Clark National Historic Trail that has yielded physical proof of the explorers' presence. Records made by Lewis and Clark often spell "Traveler's" as "Traveller's". After departing here in 1806, Lewis and Clark split up. Lewis' part of the expedition traveled through what is now the Alice Creek Historic District before rejoining the Missouri River in what is now Great Falls. Clark's portion of the expedition explored the Yellowstone River before the two halves were reunited on August 11th, 1806 when they reached Sanish, North Dakota.

At the time of landmark designation in 1960, the exact location of the expedition's campsite was unknown. Boundaries were formalized on December 12, 1983. Subsequent investigations revealed that errors had been made in setting the boundaries of the landmark. Detailed historical and scientific investigations resulted in a 55-page request for boundary corrections, submitted on May 10, 2004, and approved on March 21, 2006. A new road and bridge were built in 2006.

== Archeological Investigations ==
After the publication of Dr. Gary Moulton edition of the Lewis and Clark Journals, members of the Travelers’ Rest Chapter of the Lewis and Clark Trail Alliance began to question the true location of the Corps’ campsite. The assumed location did not match Clark's September 13th, 1805 journal entry that to get to Travelers' Rest the Corps "...proceeded down this Creek about 2 miles to where the mountains Closed on either Side crossing the Creek Several tmes & Encamped." In 1996, the need for an investigation into the precise location of the site was recognized and the Travelers' Rest chapter initiated two studies.

The first report was completed by Bob Bergantino of Montana Tech University in Butte in 1998 and revealed a more accurate location of the campsite through the recreation of astrological readings completed by Clark while on the trail. Bergantino concluded that the camp was probably located on the south side of Lolo Creek and a mile and a half west of the Bitterroot River, rather than at the confluence of the two rivers as previous assumed. Notably, the coordinates identified by Bergantino were less than 200 feet from the primary kitchen hearth eventually uncovered.

The second report utilized infrared photos taken on June 2, 1996 which were then reviewed by Daniel Hall of Western Cultural in Missoula. Hall concluded that the initial infrared photos did not expressly locate a campsite but did justify further investigation. In May of 2000, Hall prepared the report that would serve as the basis for the future archeological investigation of the area in which he identified circular and linear anomalies suggesting various methods of occupation throughout history, several of which were consistent with the expected layout of a Corps’ campsite.

=== Baron von Steuben’s Pattern of Encampment ===
It is generally accepted that Lewis and Clark, having served as officers under General Anthony Wane, would have followed the army regulations for establishing forts and campsites as outlined in Baron von Steuben’s Regulations and for the Order and Discipline of the Troops of the United States. Regulations was the US army standard of practice from 1778 to 1812 and “there is every reason to believe that Lewis and Clark adapted” the guide for the expedition. The location of the fire hearth, campfire, and latrine all follow the von Steuben model of encampment.

=== Methodology ===
The methods utilized in the study include aerial infrared photography, magnetometer and electronic conductivity testing, metal detectors, and geochemical or mercury vaporizer analysis.

Infrared photography completed in 1996 identified a linear array of circular anomalies suggestive of tipi rings. This was not a surprise to find, as the area of Travelers’ Rest is a traditional wintering site for the Bitterroot Salish. A magnetometer survey was done between April 24 and July 9, 2001 and identified about 60 anomalies warranting some sort of investigation, either through excavation units or shovel probes. Four sweeps of the area were completed with metal detectors between the summer of 2001 and early September 2002. These sweeps both supported previous findings through other analysis methods and identified a large number of additional sites of interest.

=== Excavation ===
Excavation began July 17, 2002, and ended on September 9, 2002. As per their agreement with the Tribal Historic Preservation Office of the Confederated Salish and Kootenai Tribes and Tribal elders, artifacts found pertaining to the indigenous history of the site were returned to the unit in which they were originally located upon completion of the excavation unit.

=== Recovered Artifacts ===
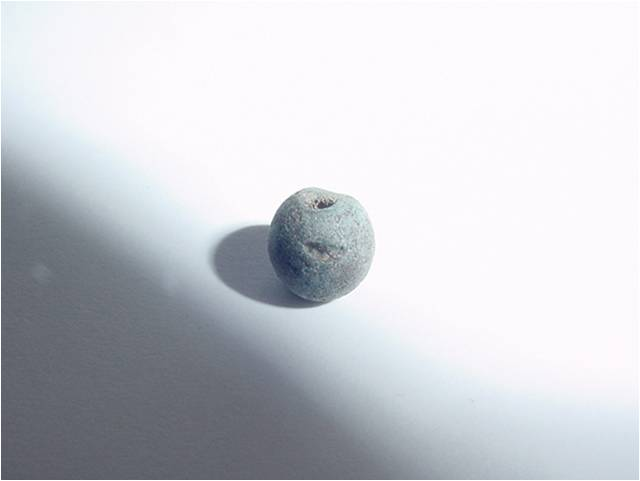
Image of the recovered trade bead found at Travelers' Rest State Park. Used with permission from the Travelers' Rest Connection website: https://travelersrest.org/

==== Tombac Button ====
A tombac button was recovered from the western edge of the site in October 1998 at a depth of 5 inches. While the button dates to the proper historical period associated with the Corps of Discovery, there are no known examples of clothing or buttons from the Expedition that have been verified.

==== Bead ====
A small, blue bead was recovered during the excavation of the kitchen fire hearth area in a layer 4 to 8 inches below the surface. The bead is consistent with the trade beads described by the Lewis and Clark Expedition among their supplies as well as those procured and traded in the early nineteenth century fur trade era.

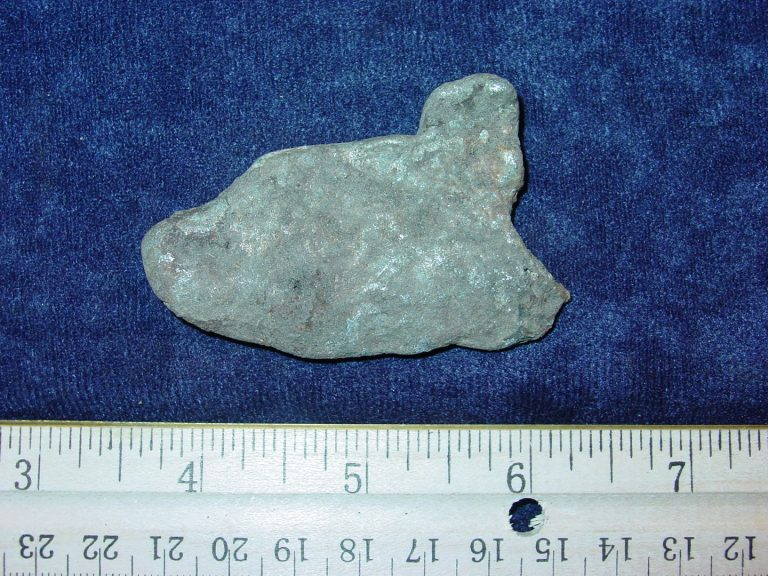
Image of the recovered lead puddle found at Travelers' Rest State Park. Used with permission from the Travelers' Rest Connection website: https://travelersrest.org/

==== Lead and charcoal ====
From the same fire hearth that yielded the bead, a hardened pool of melted lead in the shape of a puddle, fire-cracked rock, and charcoal were also recovered in this same fire hearth feature.

Carbon 14 dating by Stanford Research Laboratories of excavated charcoal samples dates the fire hearth to within range of 1785 to 1855, well within the time frame of the Expedition.

The Expedition took 52 specially made canisters of lead, each of which contained 8 pounds of lead with 4 pounds of powder, sealed in the canister with cork and wax. Each canister had the exact amount of lead needed to craft as many bullets as could be fired with the powder inside. The Corps reports reupping their supply of bullets consistently throughout the expedition, an activity that requires a fire hot enough to melt lead, which would certainly be sufficient to crack a rock as well. Lead isotope analysis from the recovered lead artifact correlates to ore samples from Olive Hill, Kentucky. However, records of the source of the lead that the Expedition purchased have never been found.

==== Mercury ====
On the Expedition’s return trip, Private Silas Goodrich and Private Hugh McNeal were being treated with Benjamin Rush's “Thunderclapper” pills. These pills contained more than 50% mercury, only 15% of which would have been absorbed into the blood stream. The rest of the mercury would have been purged from the body. Mercury is very dense and has a limited migration within the soil. However, it easily turns to vapor and may be released into the atmosphere.

A shallow, linear trench, was identified through the magnetometer analysis of the site (cite). Mercury was detected at depths ranging from 22 to 29 inches below the ground’s surface. A total of 214 samples were analyzed for mercury vapor, of which 27 samples contained detectable levels of mercury vapor through mercury vaporizer analysis. These results were sufficient to prove this trench to be the location of the “sink” or latrine for the encampment.

== See also ==
- List of National Historic Landmarks in Montana
- National Register of Historic Places listings in Missoula County, Montana
