= Alice Creek Historic District =

Historic district in Montana, United States

- U.S. National Register of Historic Places
- U.S. Historic district
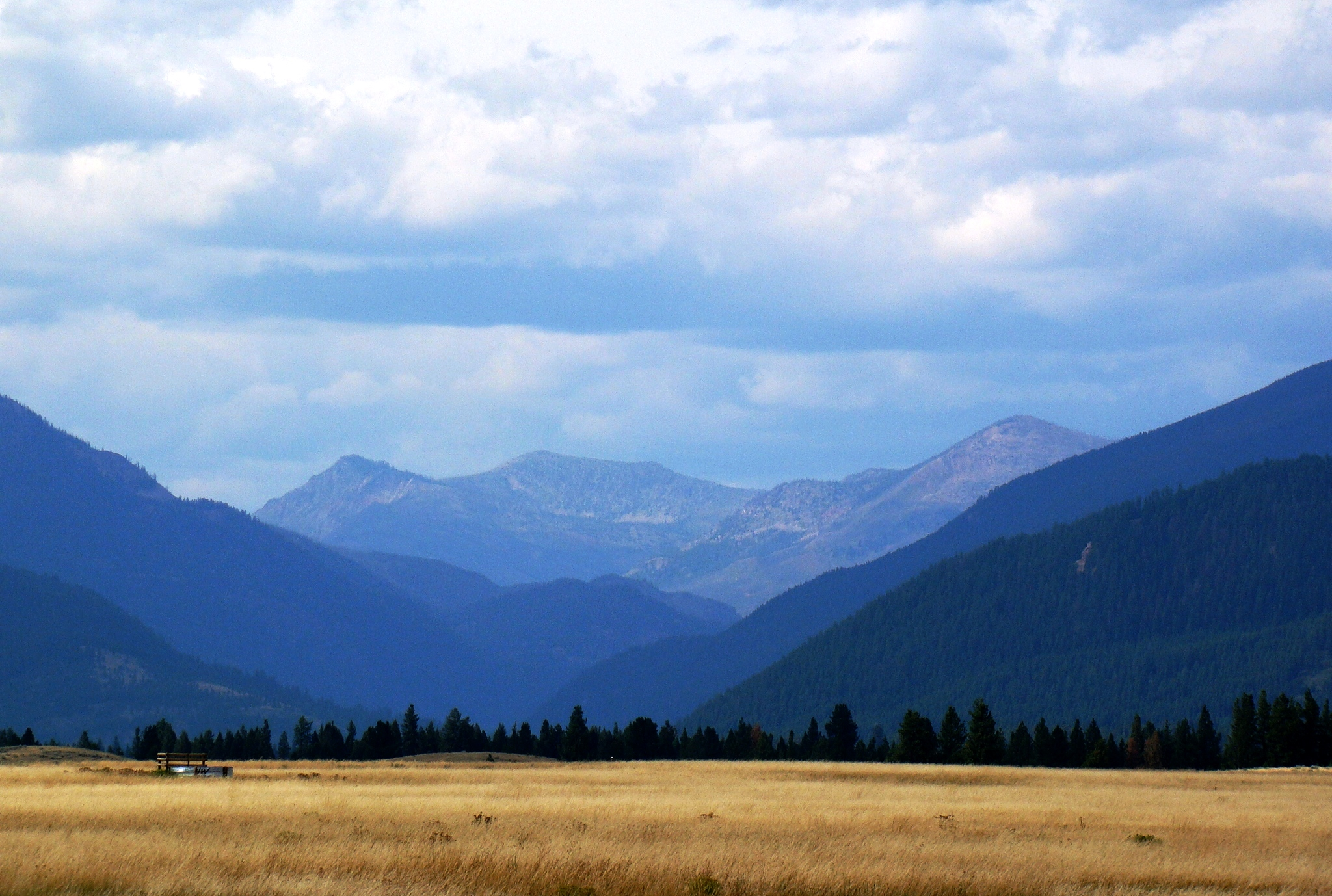
- Alice Creek Historic District, Highway 200 to Lincoln
- Nearest city: Lincoln, Montana
- Area: 5,425 acres (2,195 ha)
- Built: 1806
- NRHP reference No.: 06000531
- Added to NRHP: June 6, 2007

The Alice Creek Historic District is a historic district in the Lincoln Ranger District of Helena National Forest, Lincoln, Montana, Lewis and Clark County, Montana. Lichenometry was used for the process of nominating it for inclusion on the National Register of Historic Places; "rock cairns, stone forts, fire hearths, and a Celtic cross" were found as a result. There are no buildings within the historic district. There is a marshy area at the bottom of Alice Creek, sage flats, and many trees.

The region has been used for five thousand years by Native Americans. The primary trail in this area is the Cokahlarishkit Trail, which is a Nez Perce that means "Road to the Buffalo Trail" or "Buffalo Road River" and were long used by Native Americans. The Cokahlarishkit Trail provides the most direct route to traverse through this region of North America. After departing Traveler's Rest near Lolo, Montana, on their return trip, Meriwether Lewis' part of the Lewis and Clark Expedition explored the Alice Creek region in July 1806 and used the Cokahlarishkit Trail. This trail is now part of the Lewis and Clark Trail. Father Nicholas Point, a French Jesuit, built a stone cross here on September 28, 1842. Father Pierre-Jean De Smet also explored the region. The Alice Creek Guard Station was built here by the United States Forest Service in 1920. "The data indicates that two cairns in Landers Fork and two of the cairns in Alice Creek are Native American in origin and that one of the cairns in Alice Creek is possibly Euro-American in origin. The data indicates that the stone lookout is Native American in origin and the data also supports the theory that the stone cross is indeed associated with Father Point."

Lieutenant John Mullan mapped the area in 1863. Gold was discovered near Lincoln in 1865 and the first area homestead was filed in 1882. Several government survey crews again mapped the area between 1877 and 1911. Two of those surveyors were Demas McFarland and Lee Williams.

The Alice Creek Trailhead leads to the Lewis and Clark Pass and the Scapegoat Wilderness. Many outdoor activities such as hiking, backpacking, camping, picknicking, nature study, fishing, horse riding, and winter sports are available.

== See also ==
- Alice Creek Fire
- National Register of Historic Places listings in Lewis and Clark County, Montana
