= October 2017 Iberian wildfires =

Wildfires in Portugal and Spain

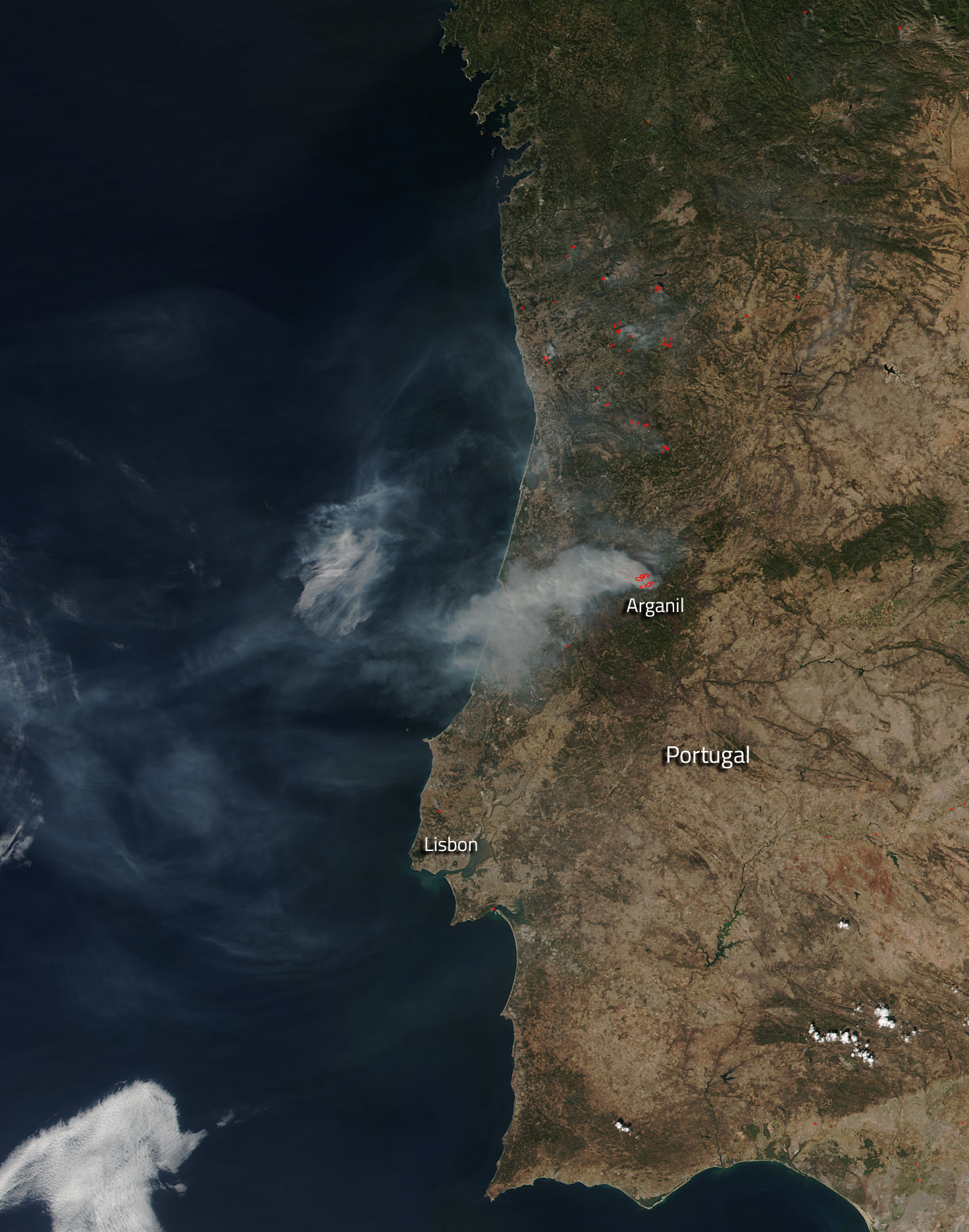
- Satellite image depicting smoke from wildfires in Portugal and northwestern Spain on 8 October.
- Date: 13–18 October 2017

Statistics
- Total fires: 7,980
- Total area: 267,432 acres (108,226 ha)

Impacts
- Deaths: 49 (45 in Portugal and 4 in Spain)
- Injuries: 91
- Cost: Unknown

The October 2017 Iberian wildfires were a series of more than 7,900 forest fires affecting Northern Portugal and Northwestern Spain between 13 and 18 October. The wildfires claimed the lives of at least 49 individuals, including 45 in Portugal and four in Spain, and dozens more were injured.

The first fires started on or before 13 October in Galicia. The Prime Minister of Spain Mariano Rajoy and Jorge Gomes, Portugal's secretary of state of internal administration, believed most of the fires were lit by arsonists. By 15 October 2017 winds increased, due in part to Hurricane Ophelia passing between the Azores and the peninsula, which helped fan wildfires in both Portugal and Spain.

In Portugal, on its worst day, firefighters battled over 440 fires. The country sought assistance from European neighbours and Morocco. The Portuguese Minister of Internal Administration Constança Urbano de Sousa, who resigned as a consequence, said "We have all our firefighters out there doing everything they can".

Four months earlier, the June 2017 Portugal wildfires had caused 66 deaths in Portugal, for a total of 115 deaths (111 in Portugal, 4 in Spain) between the two incidents.

== Meteorological aftermath in Europe ==
The arrival of Ophelia brought Saharan dust to parts of the United Kingdom, giving the sky an orange or yellow-sepia appearance, and the sun a red or orange appearance. A strange 'burning' smell was also reported across Devon, also attributed to the dust, and smoke from forest fires in Portugal and Spain. Winds up to 115 km/h (71 mph) were observed in Orlock Head, County Down, at the height of the storm. Approximately 50,000 households lost power in Northern Ireland. Insurance claims from Northern Ireland, Wales, and Scotland are estimated to reach £5–10 million (US$6.6–13.2 million).

In Tallinn, Estonia, a black rain occurred due to the fact that Ophelia steered smoke and soot from the fires to Estonia from Portugal, as well as dust from the Sahara Desert, Report informs citing the Estonian media. "We looked at photos from satellites and the Finnish weather service confirmed that the smoke and soot of the fires in Portugal and partly the dust from the Sahara reached us," meteorologist Taimi Paljak said.

== See also ==
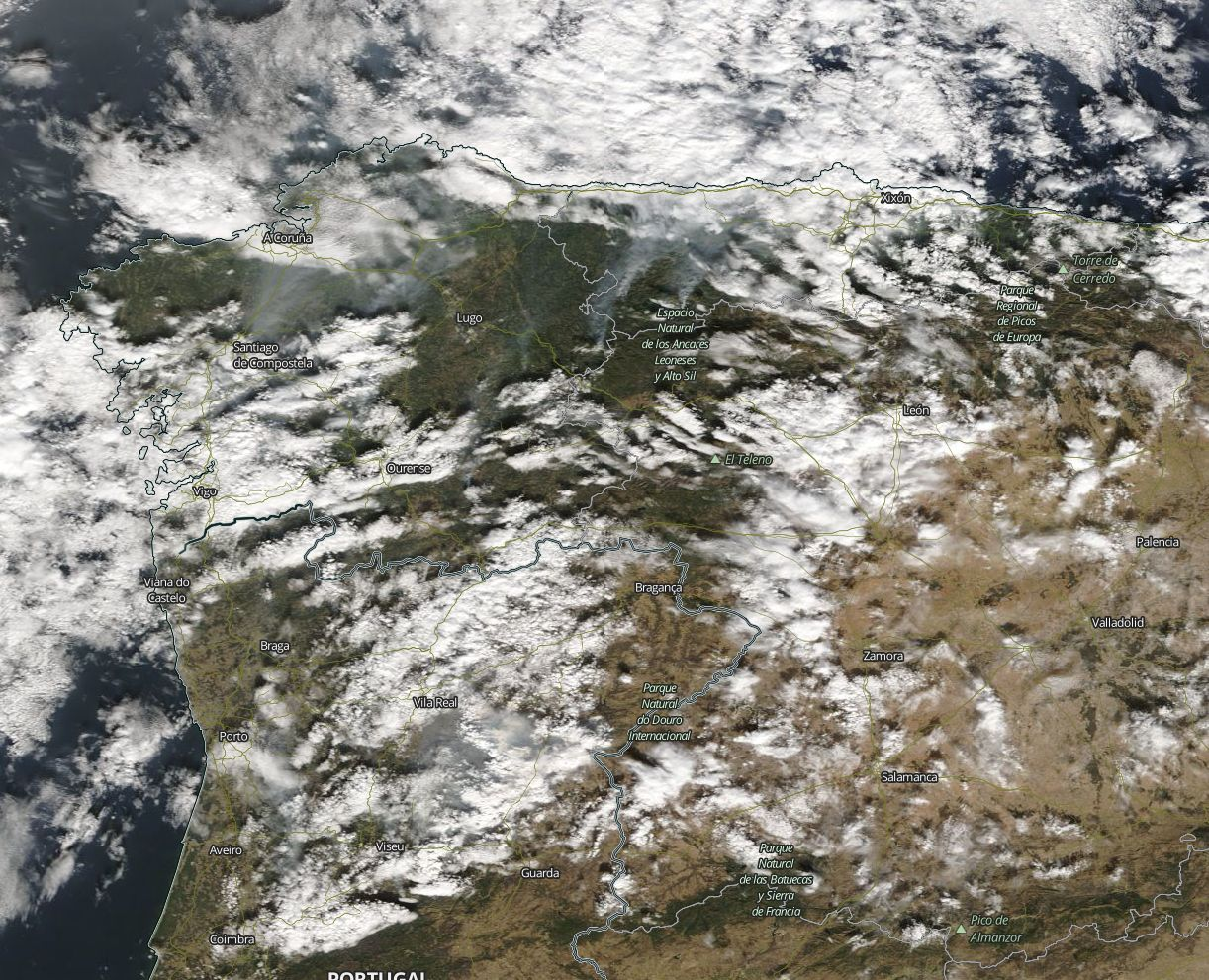
Satellite image depicting smoke from wildfires in northern Portugal and northwestern Spain on 15 October ahead of Hurricane Ophelia.

- June 2017 Portugal wildfires
- 2017 wildfire season
- 2024 Portugal wildfires
