= Reef Fire =

Wildlife in Montana, US

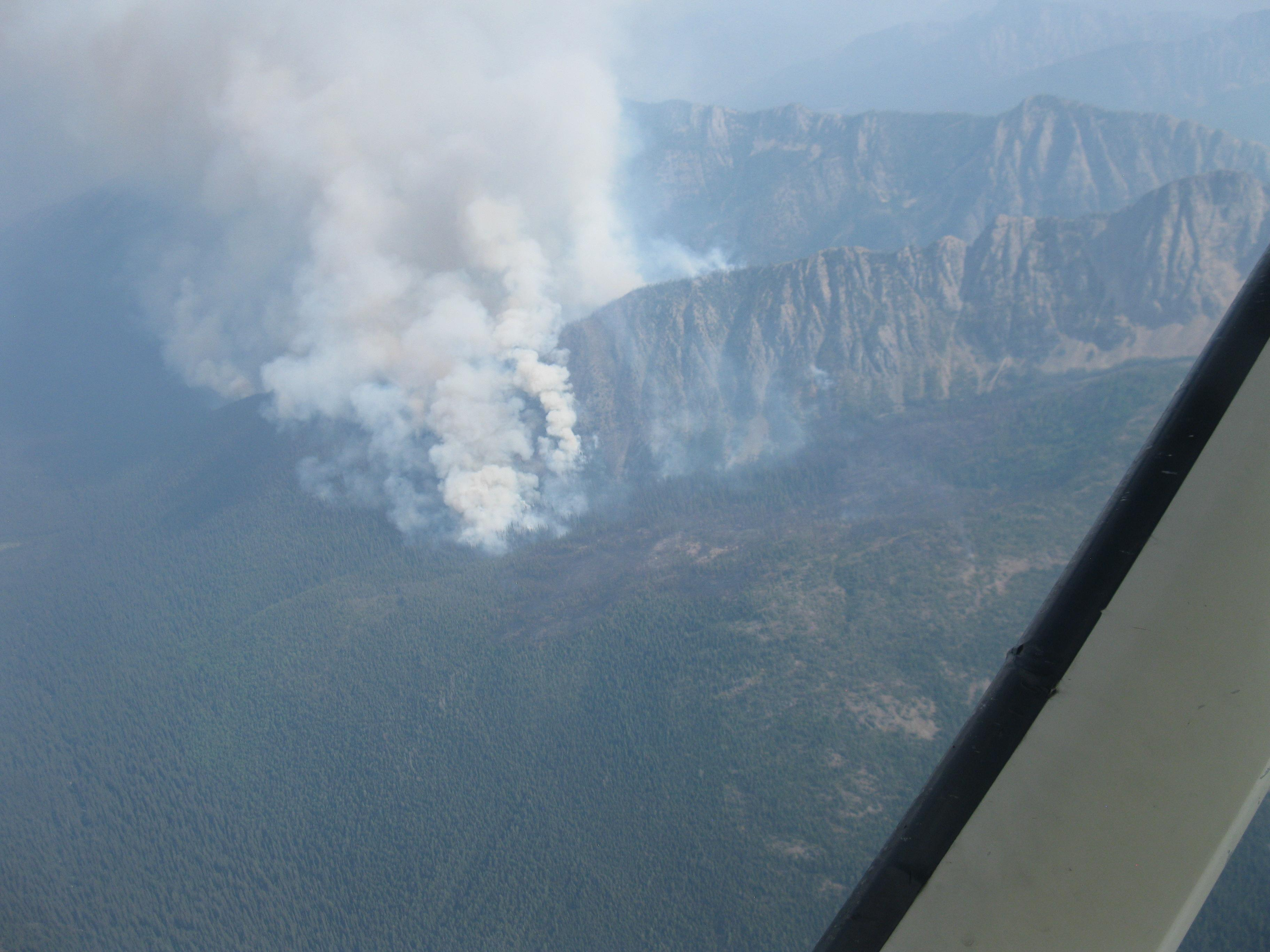
- The Reef Fire on August 28, 2017
- Date: August 13, 2017 –
- Location: Bob Marshall Wilderness, Montana, United States
- Coordinates: 47.348°N 113.402°W

Statistics
- Burned area: 10,658 acres (43 km^{2})

Ignition
- Cause: Lightning

Map
- Location of fire in Montana.

The Reef Fire was a wildfire that was started by a lightning strike and took place in the Bob Marshall Wilderness in Montana in the United States, near Count Peak. The fire, which was reported on August 13, 2017, burned more than 10,658 acres (43 km^{2}) and was contained by October 1, 2017. Instead, it wound up merging with the Rice Ridge Fire.

== Events ==
The Reef Fire was reported on August 13, 2017 at 5:45 PM. The fire, was located near Count Peak in the Bob Marshall Wilderness in the Flathead National Forest. The fire was being fueled by timber and sub-alpine fir. On September 3, the fire had crossed and moved downstream Babcock Creek, Youngs Creek and settled in Otter Creek. Before merging with the Rice Ridge Fire on September 5, the fire was being monitored in its burn and was allowed to take its natural course due to concerns for firefighter safety given the rural location of the fire.

== Closures and evacuations ==
Numerous trails and trailheads were closed due to the Reef Fire, specifically: Cardinal Peak Divide # 136, Cabin Creek #205, Pilot Peak #128, Cardinal Creek #506, Young's Creek #141, Hahn Creek #125, Hahn Creek Cut-across #124, Otter Creek #279 and Blackfoot Divide #278 are closed due to fire behavior.
