= Bearskin Fire =

2017 wildfire in Idaho, USA

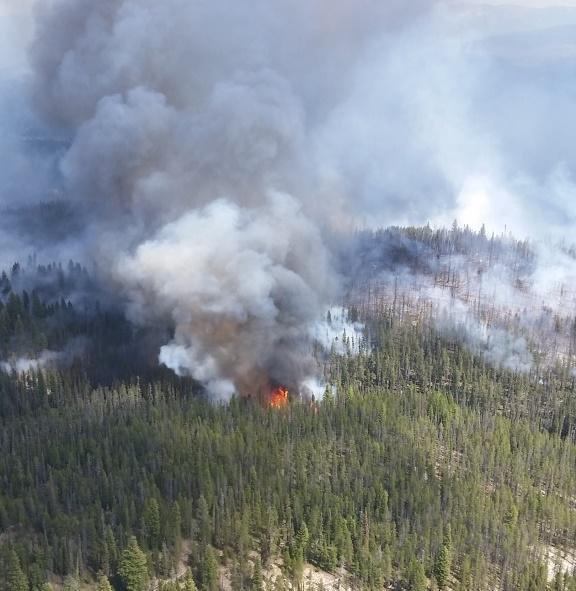
- The Bearskin Fire on August 25, 2017
- Date: August 23, 2017 – October 2, 2017
- Location: Valley County, Idaho United States
- Coordinates: 44.388°N 115.527°W

Statistics
- Burned area: 30,251 acres (122 km^{2})

Ignition
- Cause: Lightning

Map
- Location of fire in Idaho.

The Bearskin Fire was a wildfire in Valley County, Idaho in the United States, 21 miles northeast of Lowman. The fire, which was reported on August 23, 2017, burned a total of 30,251 acres (122 km^{2}).

== Events ==
The Bearskin Fire was reported on August 23, 2017, at 7:30 PM. Firefighters responded to the fire on August 25, which had burned 93 acres (0 km^{2}) upon their arrival. The area where the fire was discovered is very remote, with the fire being fueled by dead and down lodgepole pine and sub-alpine fir timber. The crew used a confinement strategy due to fears about firefighter safety and lack of resources available due to other fires burning in the state.

By August 27, the fire had expanded to 476 acres (2 km^{2}). At that time, 100 fire personnel were fighting the fire. Crews focused on removing roadside vegetation from nearby National Forest System roads, Deer Flat Campground, and an Idaho Power weather station. The Deer Flat Campground was closed.

Two days later, on August 29, the fire had spread to approximately 5,000 acres (20 km^{2}), fueled by dead, bug kill and down lodgepole pine and sub-alpine fir. Closures were expanded to the entire area surrounding the fire, specifically the Lowman Ranger District in the Boise National Forest.

The fire almost doubled overnight, expanding to 11,305 acres (46 km^{2}) due to winds ahead of thunderstorms. The fire had crossed a National Forest System road and moved closer to the Deer Flat Campground and into the Little Beaver Creek drainage. Numerous National Forest System road were closed. The next day, September 1, the fire grew to 12,000 acres (49 km^{2}), burning in the northern end of Bear Valley. The Deadwood Reservoir and all nearby campgrounds were closed.

By the evening of September 2, the fire had grown 15,278 acres (62 km^{2}), burning approximately four miles north of Deadwood Reservoir, burning up steep and rough terrain. The next day, September 3, the fire had grown to over 19,000 acres (77 km^{2}) with the fire expanding into Frank Church–River of No Return Wilderness. This led to Clear Creek Road to be closed. Additionally, the fire had moved closer to Deadwood Reservoir and headed into the Warm Springs and Wilson drainages. Crews chipped felled trees and removed corridor snags.

As of September 9, the fire had spread to the ridgeline of Mount Pilgrim, threatening the Deadwood Outfitters lodge. The Bearskin Fire was at 25,808 acres (104 km^{2}). By September 15, leadership had reduced closures on Boise and Salmon Challis National Forest, providing access to the land for hunters and general recreation. The fire burned a total of 30,251 acres (122 km^{2}). Many areas of the Boise National Forest remain closed due to the impact of the fire.
