= Park Creek Fire =

2017 wildfire in Montana, United States

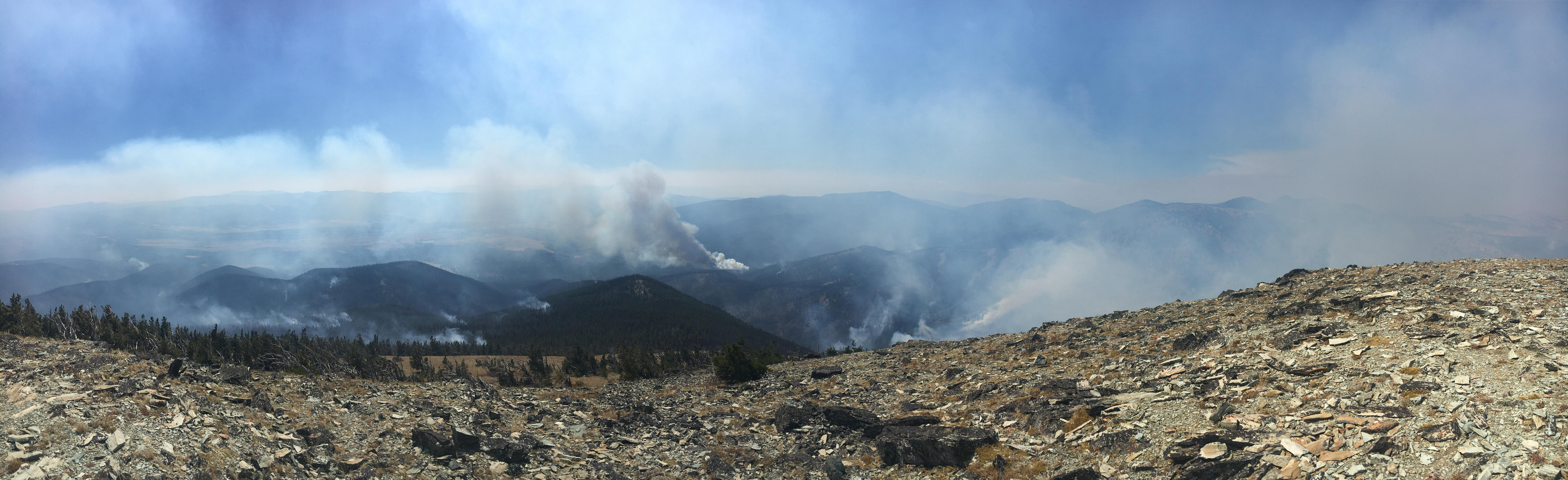
- Park Creek Fire on August 27, 2017
- Date: July 14, 2017 –
- Location: Lincoln and Helena National Forest and Lewis and Clark National Forest, Montana, United States
- Coordinates: 47.021°N 112.691°W

Statistics
- Burned area: 18,000 acres (73 km^{2})

Ignition
- Cause: Lightning

Map
- Location of fire in Montana.

The Park Creek Fire was a wildfire located two miles north of Lincoln in Helena National Forest and Lewis and Clark National Forest in Montana in the United States. The fire, which was reported on July 14, 2017, was started by lightning and burned over 18,000 acres (73 km^{2}). It threatened the community of Lincoln and directly impacted recreational activities in the national forests.

== Events ==
The Park Creek Fire was first reported on July 14, 2017, approximately two miles north of Lincoln, Montana. Lightning was identified as starting the fire, which had burned over 40 acres (0 km^{2}) by the evening of July 15. Dead timber was identified as one of the primary fuels. An immediate closure of two trailheads was put in place due to expected growth of the fire and by the next day, park road closures were in place.

On July 19, fire crews protected the Stonewall Mountain Lookout due to the fire crawling closer to the structure. A temporary flight restriction was put in place for a five-mile radius around Stonewall Mountain.

By the start of August, the fire had spread to 4,772 acres (19 km^{2}). On August 8, the Forest Service implemented stage one fire restrictions, prohibiting campfires and other fires outside of approved recreation sites and halted smoking outside of buildings, vehicles and recreation sites unless one is in a 3-foot diameter area cleared of all burnable vegetation.

Starting on September 4, all National Forest Service Lands, roads and trails off of Highway 200 were closed. The fire crested on the north side of Arrastra Mountain and in the waters of Dry Creek.

By September 15, Sucker Creek Road and Copper Creek Road had reopened.

== Closures and evacuations ==
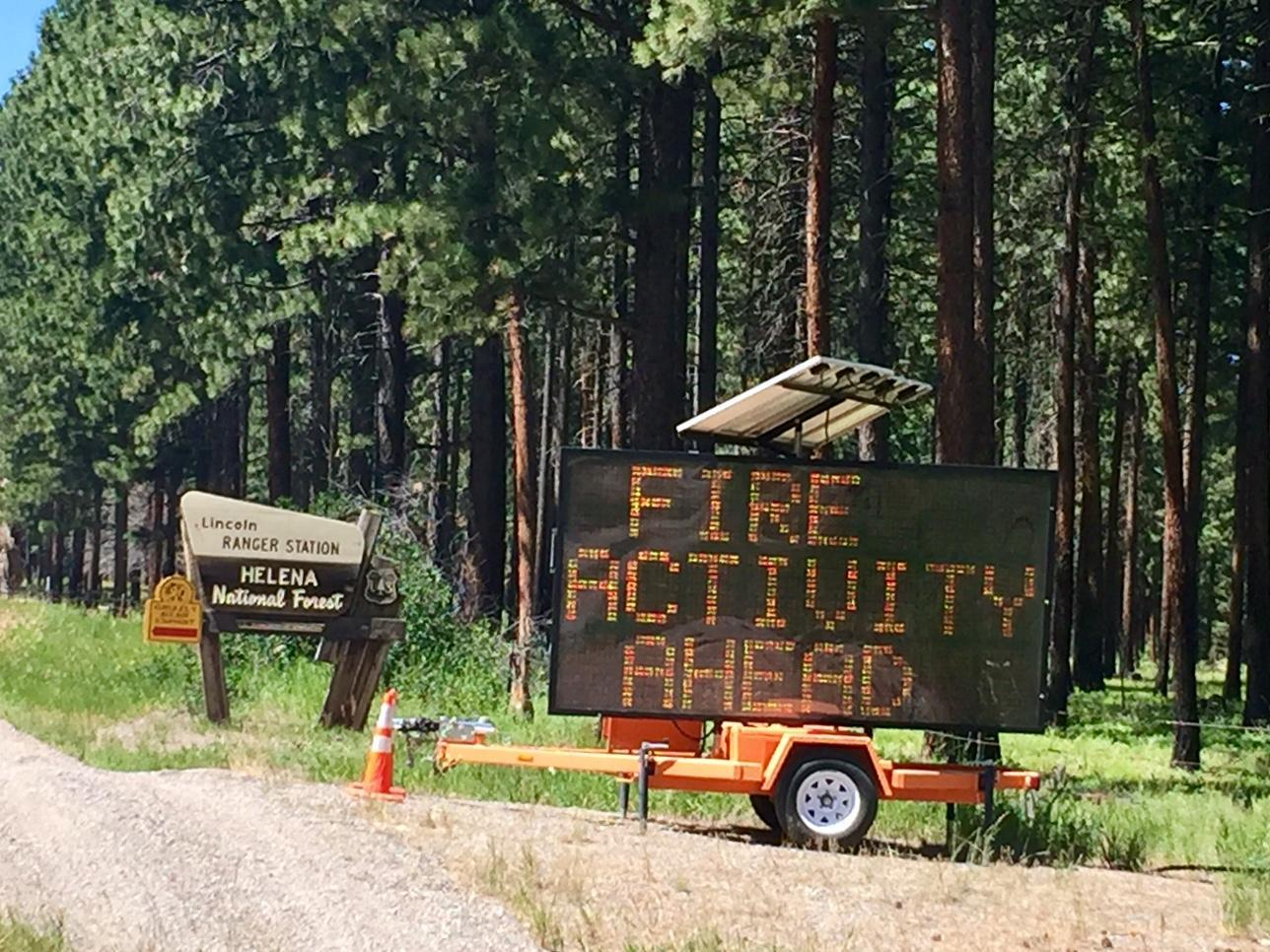
Fire warning signs at the entrance of Lincoln Ranger Station

Beaver Creek Road over Huckleberry Summit to the Forest Boundary were closed. Trailhead closures were in place for Trail #418 from the trailhead on Sucker Creek Road to Snowbank Lake; and Trail #417 from the end of Forest Service Road #1821 to Stonewall Mountain Lookout. Road closures were in place for the Forest Service boundary on the west to FS Road # 330 (Copper Creek Road) on the east; and FS #607 (Park Creek Road) from the intersection of Forest Road #4106 to the Forest Service boundary. Additionally, all roads, trails and lands off of Highway 200 were closed.
