= Meyers Fire =

2017 wildfire in Montana, United States

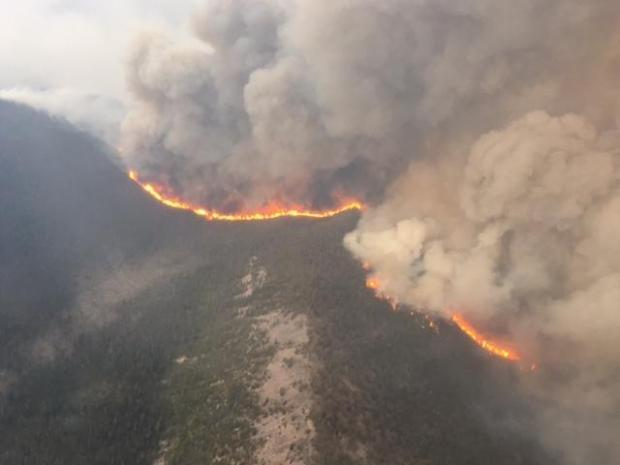
- Meyers Fire August 28, 2017
- Date: Started July 17, 2017; 5:21pm
- Location: Beaverhead-Deerlodge National Forest and Bitterroot National Forest, Montana, United States
- Coordinates: 45.995°N 113.58°W

Statistics
- Burned area: 62,034 acres (25,104 ha)
- Land use: Forest

Impacts
- Deaths: 0
- Injuries: 0
- Structures lost: 0

Ignition
- Cause: Lightning

The Meyers Fire burned in Beaverhead-Deerlodge National Forest and Bitterroot National Forest in the U.S. state of Montana and was first reported on July 17, 2017 at 5:21pm. Located approximately 25 mi (40 km) southwest of Phillipsburg, Montana, the Meyers Fire is a natural fire that was caused by lightning. As of September 28, 2017, it encompassed 62,034 acres (25,104 ha). The Meyers Fire originated after a lightning storm passed over the region, starting a fire in remote terrain in Granite County, Montana within Beaverhead-Deerlodge National Forest. The fire then burned into neighboring Ravalli County, Montana and then crossed the continental divide into Beaverhead County, Montana and Deer Lodge County, Montana, where it entered Bitterroot National Forest. By August 3, the Meyers and Whetstone Fires merged, with the name of the former being the official name of the event. Due to a heavy fuel load, exceptionally dry conditions with high heat and periods of strong winds, the Meyers Fire had periods of explosive growth during August and early September, leading to evacuations of nearby communities.
