= Lodgepole Complex Fire =

2017 wildfire in Montana, US

- Date: July 19, 2017; 8 years ago
- Location: 52 miles WNW of Jordan, Montana, U.S.
- Coordinates: 47.318°N 107.758°W

Statistics
- Burned area: Over 270,000 acres (110,000 ha) as of July 31

Ignition
- Cause: Lightning

The Lodgepole Complex Fire in the U.S. state of Montana was the state's and the nation's largest fire of the 2017 wildfire season as of early September, 2017. It burned on public and private land 52 miles WNW of Jordan, Montana and was caused by lightning on July 19. A mix of grassland and pine forest was involved. Sixteen homes and 16 unidentified structures were destroyed, and firefighting efforts cost over six million dollars.
