= Rice Ridge Fire =

2017 wildfire in Montana, United States

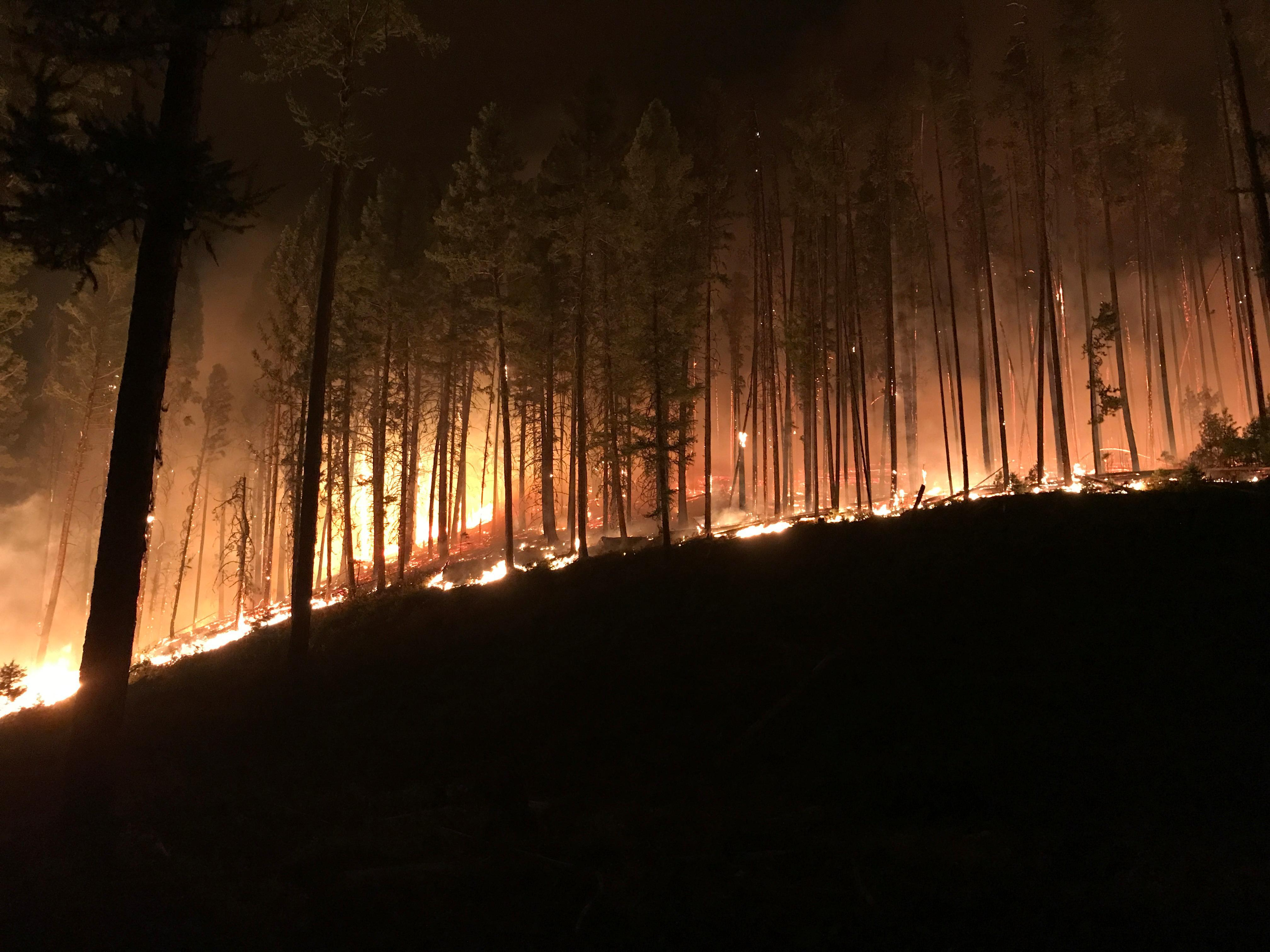
- Rice Ridge Fire on September 12, 2017
- Date: July 24, 2017 –
- Location: Lolo National Forest, Montana in the United States
- Coordinates: 47.27°N 113.31°W

Statistics
- Burned area: 155,900 acres (631 km^{2})

Impacts
- Cost: $33.8 million

Ignition
- Cause: Lightning

Map
- Location of fire in Montana.

The Rice Ridge Fire was a wildfire that burned northeast of Seeley Lake in the Lolo National Forest in Montana in the United States. The fire, which was started by a lightning strike on July 24, 2017, became a megafire on September 3, growing from 40,000 acres (162 km^{2}) to over 100,000 acres (405 km^{2}), at which time it became the nation’s top wildfire priority as of early September 2017. Located north and east of Seeley Lake, Montana, over 700 firefighting personnel were assigned to the blaze, primarily active in a mountainous lodgepole and mixed conifer forest. The fire had burned 155,900 acres (631 km^{2}) and at one point threatened over 1,000 homes in Powell County and Missoula County including the town of Seeley Lake, Montana and areas north of Highway 200, east of Highway 83. Evacuation orders included parts of Powell County north of Montana Highway 200, areas east of Montana Highway 83, and evacuation warnings for other sections of the forest within Missoula County.

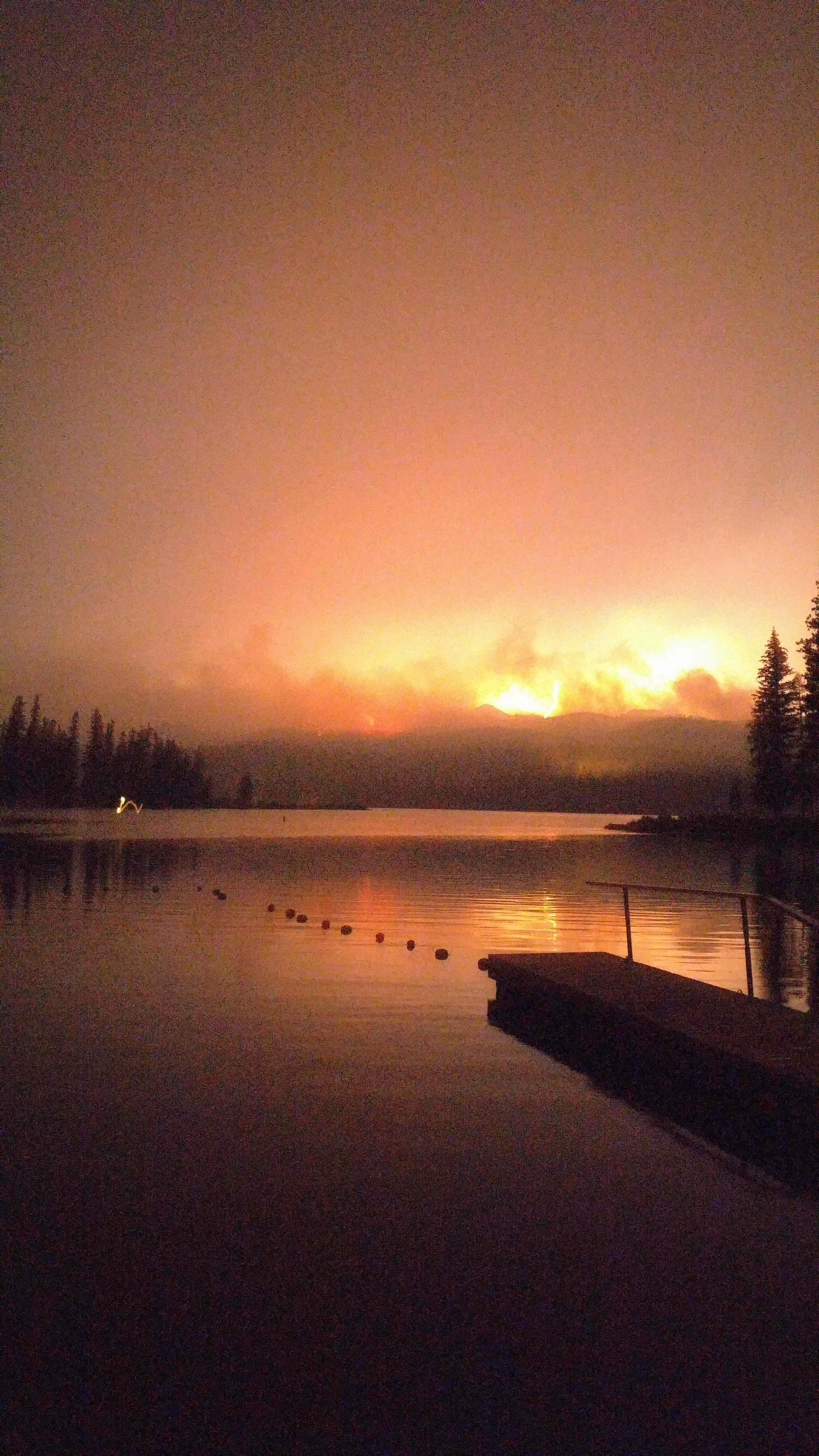
Fire as seen from Seeley Lake, Montana

== August ==
The Rice Ridge Fire was started by a lightning strike on July 24, 2017. By August 5, the fire had spread near Morrell Falls and made runs towards the Bob Marshall Wilderness. Aircraft focused on making water drops while crews worked on protective activities along Highway 83 and on the northside of Seeley Lake and Double Arrow Lodge. Evacuation warnings were put in place for residents of on both side of Highway 83 south of Rice Ridge Road to Morrell Creek and south of Cottonwood Lakes Road, east of Highway 83, including Seeley Lake and Double Arrow Lodge. The American Red Cross opened a shelter at the Potomac Community Center. On September 6, a drone flew into the restricted fire area, causing fire protection work to stop temporarily.

As of August 7, Seeley Lake itself was closed so that aerial crews could draw water from the lake, but the homes and businesses around the lake were open. The fire burned on the east side of Rice Ridge and in Swamp Creek. Crews shifted to focus on containing the fire on Morrell Mountain, also protecting the Morrell Mountain Lookout. Seeley Lake re-opened for recreational use on August 18. The next day, one campground remained closed and the fire had grown in Cottonwood Creek, causing Lolo National Forest to expand closures.

On August 24, a forest service road, running north along Cottonwood Canyon, was evacuated due to threats to two cabins. Two trails were also closed. By the 27th, the fire had expanded to 22,427 acres (91 km^{2}) and threatened 1,060 homes. The next day, Seeley Lake was once more closed for recreational use. A third drone flight through the fire zone caused the crew activities to stop that evening. Mandatory evacuations were put in place due to the fire threatening 580 homes in the Seeley Lake area and schools were closed.

== September ==
As of September 1, the fire had burned 37,032 acres (150 km^{2}) and was 18% contained. The fire continued to burn on Morrell Mountain and towards Cottonwood Lakes Road. Seeley Swan High School classes moved to a local resort due to fire threats. The Blackfoot-Clearwater Wildlife Management Area was closed, too. By Sunday night, September 3, the fire grew into a megafire after mapping flights reported it had burned 101,419 acres (410 km^{2}), nearly doubling in size within 24 hours. Additional evacuations were put in place over the next two days. By the morning of September 5, the Reef Fire merged into the Rice Ridge Fire. That evening, mandatory evacuation orders were lifted for Seeley Lake.

On September 7, Seeley Lake reopened for recreational use. By the end of the next day, structure protections were completed for 25 homes on the north side of Placid Lake and on cabins around Coopers Lake. A strategic, aerial burnout took place over three days to help secure the fire line.

Evacuation orders were revoked on September 15 and the Blackfoot-Clearwater Wildlife Management Area and lands owned by The Nature Conservancy were re-opened.
