= Highline Fire =

2017 wildfire in Idaho, USA

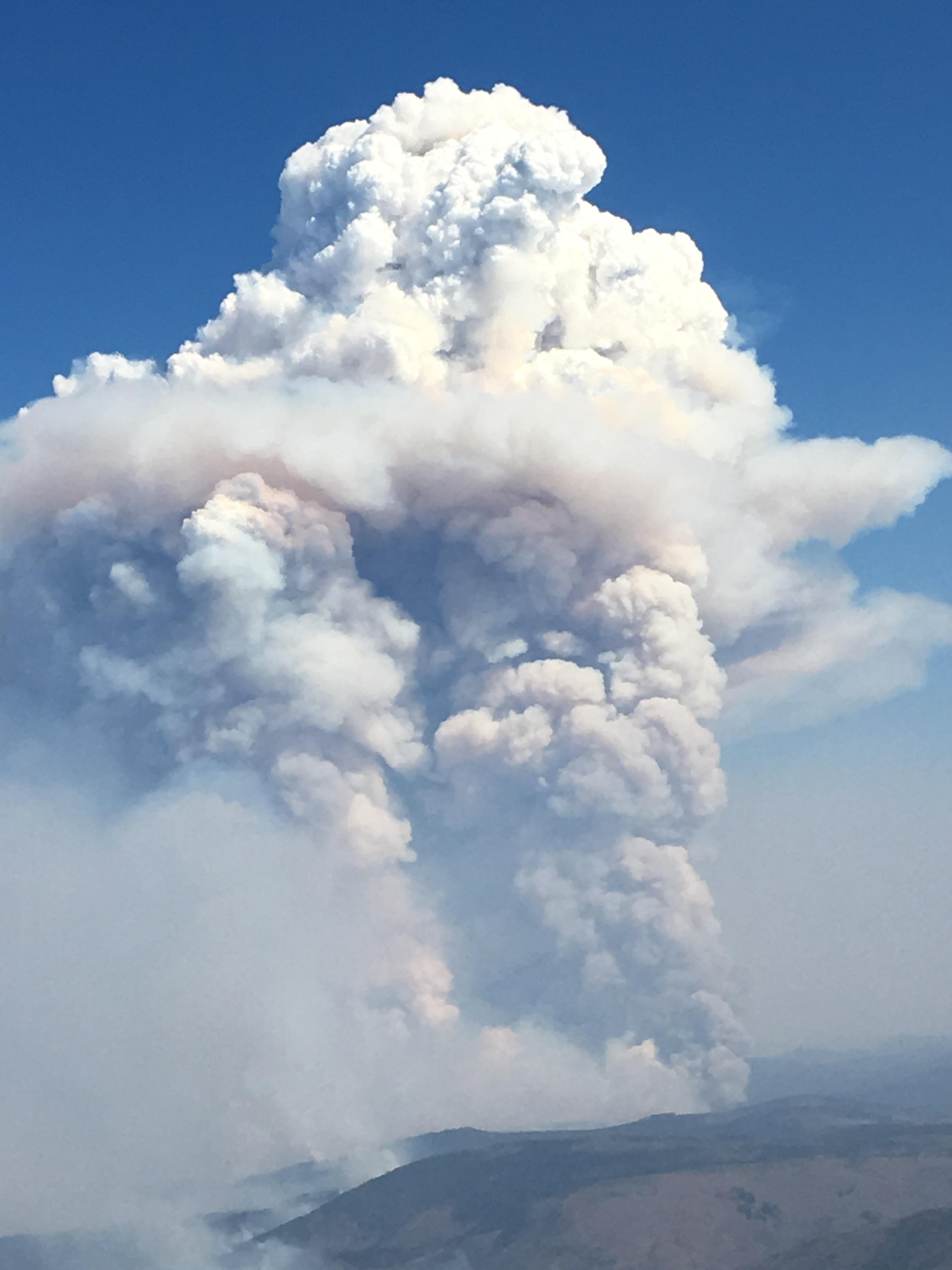
- Highline Fire on September 3, 2017
- Date: July 29, 2017 – August 2017
- Location: Payette National Forest, Idaho, United States
- Coordinates: 45.494°N 115.233°W

Statistics
- Burned area: 84,619 acres (342 km^{2})

Ignition
- Cause: Lightning and thunder storms

Map
- Location of fire in Idaho.

The Highline Fire was a wildfire in Payette National Forest, 23 miles east of Warren, Idaho in the United States. The fire was reported on July 29, 2017. The cause of the fire was lightning. The fire burned 84,619 acres (342 km^{2}) and was contained in August 2017. The fire closed access to many parts of Payette National Forest, including three airstrips. The Highline was accompanied by the nearby Goat Fire, which was burning in the same region, at a smaller acreage.

== Events ==
The Highline Fire was started by a lightning strike on July 28 around 7:00 PM in the Payette National Forest, specifically the Krassel Ranger District, within the Frank Church River of No Return Wilderness.

By August 18, the fire had expanded to 10,991 acres (44 km^{2}), burning mainly within old fire scars from a 2000 fire. Crews focused on letting the fire "play its natural ecological role...to the greatest extent possible while protecting the known values of risk." They took actions to suppress the fire regarding protecting property or life, including guard stations, Idaho Fish and Game structures. Historic structures under threat include Stonebraker Ranch and cabins, outbuildings and the Chamberlain USFS Airport at the Chamberlain Guard Station. At this time, the Chamberlain USFS Airport was closed.

As of August 20, fire crews had begun evaluating structure protection at Root Ranch. The fire had burned 18,393 acres (74 km^{2}) by the evening. By August 23, the Goat Fire had begun, burning 41 acres (0 km^{2}) alongside the Highline in the same area. Protection of the Cold Meadows Guard Station began. The first day of September brought additional protection for additional areas and structures, including those located along the Salmon River, including lodges, campgrounds, bridges, cabins and guard stations.

By September 5, the fire had grown to 67,942 acres (275 km^{2}), with the accompanying Goat Fire growing to 480 acres (2 km^{2}). Both fires remain at zero containment with the goal of letting them run their natural course. The Cold Meadows USFS Airport was closed due to poor runway conditions. As of September 10, the fire was burning 82,133 acres (332 km^{2}) and was at zero containment. The fire made its way to the Rock Rabbit Lookout, which survived.

== Evacuations and closures ==
The Chamberlain Airstrip was closed for several months.
