= Alice Creek Fire =

2017 wildfire in Montana, United States

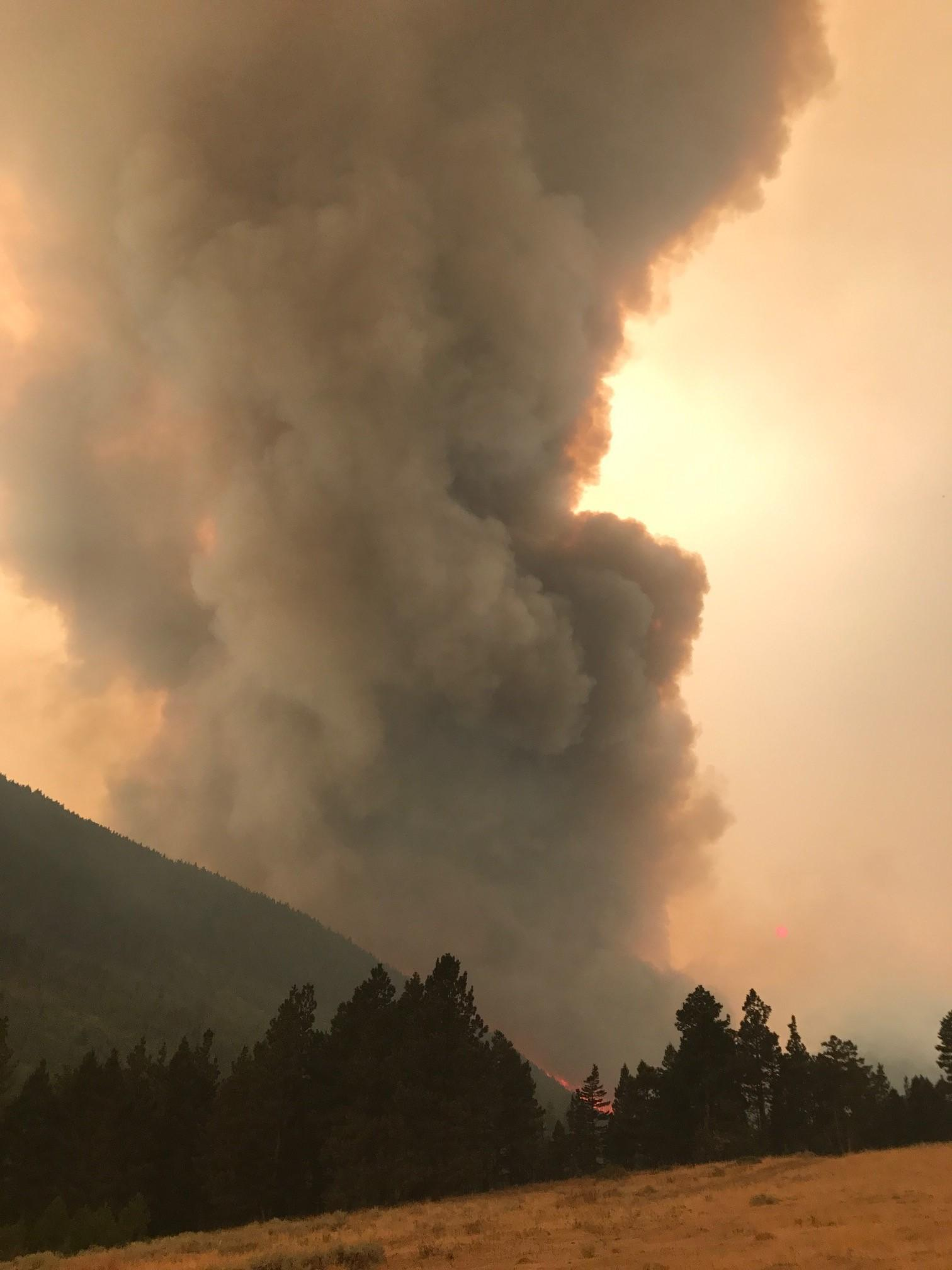
- Alice Creek Fire on August 28, 2017
- Date: July 22, 2017 –
- Location: Lewis and Clark National Forest, Montana, United States
- Coordinates: 47.154°N 112.502°W

Statistics
- Burned area: 29,252 acres (118 km^{2})

Impacts
- Structures lost: 4

Ignition
- Cause: Lightning

Map
- Location of fire in Montana.

The Alice Creek Fire was a wildfire north of Lincoln in the Lewis and Clark National Forest, located in Lewis and Clark County in Montana in the United States. The fire, started by a lightning strike, was reported on July 22, 2017. The fire burned at least 29,252 acres (118 km^{2}). The Alice Creek Fire crossed the Continental Divide, impacting wildlife, specifically aquatic life, and threatened the Alice Creek Historic District.

== Events ==
=== August ===
The Alice Fire was reported on July 22, 2017, at 6:37 PM, 16 miles northeast of Lincoln, Montana. The cause for the fire was a lightning strike. Upon its discovery, the fire had burned a mere 20 acres (0 km^{2}) The fire grew slowly and by August 6, it was already 10% contained at 59 acres (0 km^{2}). Fire crews camped out near the fire due to its remote location, utilizing a helicopter for transportation. At this time, preventative measures were passed prohibiting fires (including campfires) outside of approved recreation areas and no smoking within 3 feet of vegetation.

By August 24, the fire's containment dropped to 5% and its acreage grew to 400 acres (2 km^{2}), due to low humidity and a heat settlement in the area. Numerous trails were closed on this day, including parts of the Continental Divide Trail. Hikers traveling along the trail were rerouted to Montana Highway 200. On August 25, the fire had crossed the Continental Divide.

Due to extremely dry temperatures and gusty wind conditions, the fire spread to over 3,900 acres (16 km^{2}) by August 27. Mandatory evacuations were started for residents of the Elk Meadows subdivision and ranches west of Road 434/435 and north of Highway 200. A shelter was opened by the American Red Cross in Helena.

At this time, fire crews launched actions to protect homes in the Elk Meadows/Evergreen subdivisions, seeking to keep the fire in the National Forest and protecting 13 homes and ranches. Processes also began to minimize impact on the Alice Creek Historic District and to prevent aquatic animals from being transported over the Continental Divide. At this time, the fire was at 5,266 acres (21 km^{2}).

On August 31, two National Guard Chinook helicopters arrived on the scene of the fire to provide water delivery support to firefighters.

=== September ===
These helicopters would help contribute to the 5% containment that would be met by September 2. However, erratic behavior of the fire would force the evacuation of eight more homes in Elk Meadows. The fire remained at 5% containment, but had grown to 11,593 acres (47 km^{2}), therefore the Forest expanded closures in the area.

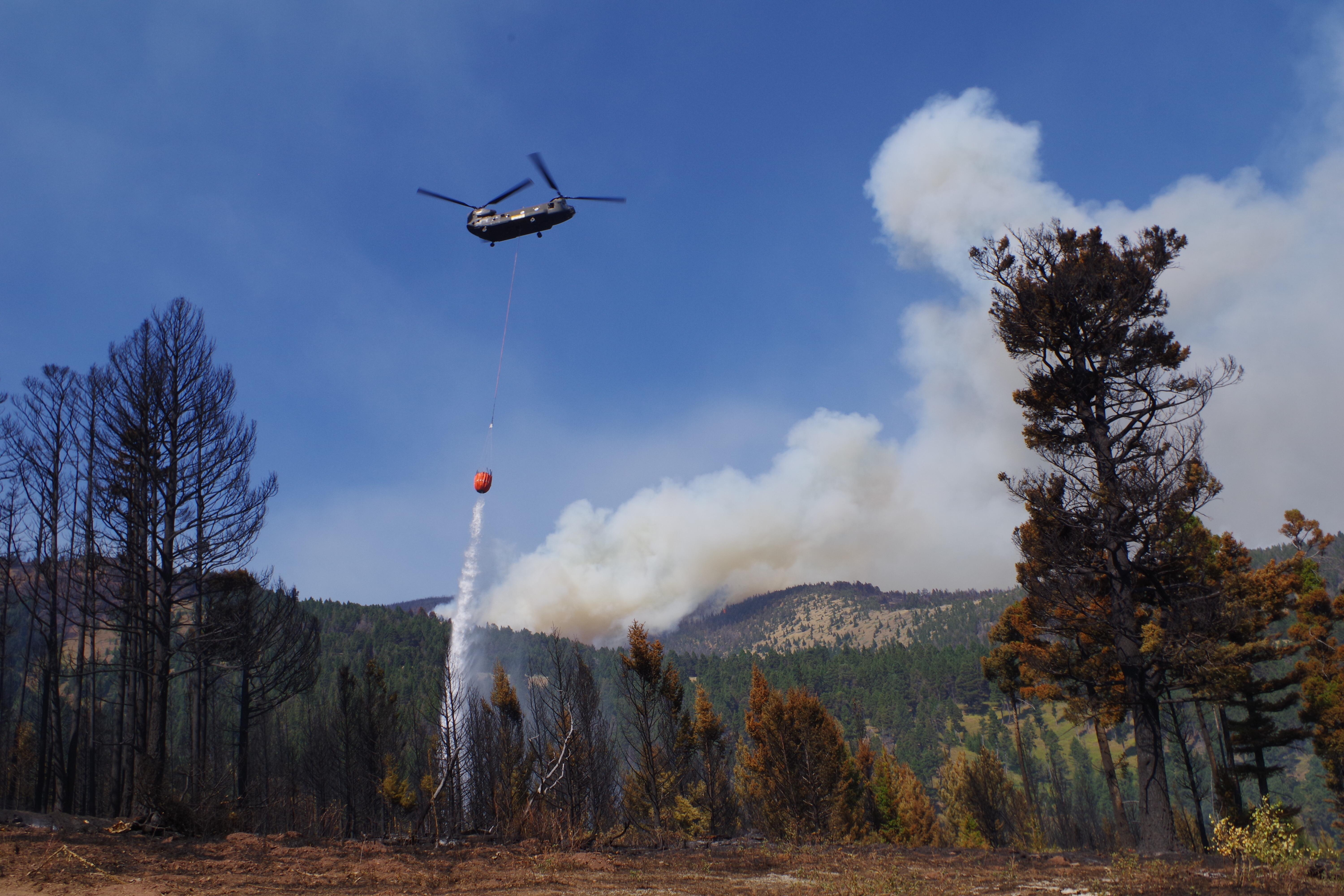
A Chinook helicopter dropping water on the Alice Creek Fire

Alice Creek Basin and Tom's Gulch were evacuated on September 3. The Lewis & Clark County Sheriff issued mandatory evacuation orders for two more subdivisions on September 4: Landers Fork and Elk Trail. Highway 200 was reopened.

On September 7, the fire spread into Tom's Gulch, Alice Creek and Telephone Gulch. Mandatory evacuations were put in place for 12 residents between Mile Marker 92 and Highway 434 along Highway 200 due to movement near the Elk Meadows/Evergreen subdivision. The next day, September 8, Highway 200 was re-opened to the public, however, 11 more residents were evacuated in the area. As of September 9, the Alice Creek Fire had burned 27,000 acres (109 km^{2}) and was at zero containment. Evacuation impacted approximately 90 individuals. Four structures, located on Bedrock Road, were destroyed in the fire.

Fire crews continued to work to protect structures in subdivisions and in areas near Alice Creek Lake, Silver King Lake and along Highway 200. By the 11th, the fire had moved along Highway 200, on the west side. Two days of rain later in the week helped calm the fire. Firefighters focused on cleaning mud laden roads and to monitor containment lines. Evacuation orders were revoked for residents, with areas remaining closed for visitors.

== Evacuations and closures ==
All areas in the Lewis and Clark National Forest, north of Highway 200 in the Lincoln Ranger District, were closed.

Road closures were in effect on these roads: Alice Creek Road, Copper Creek Road at the Landers Fork Road junction, and McDonough Road.
