= Conrow Fire =

2017 wildfire in Montana, United States

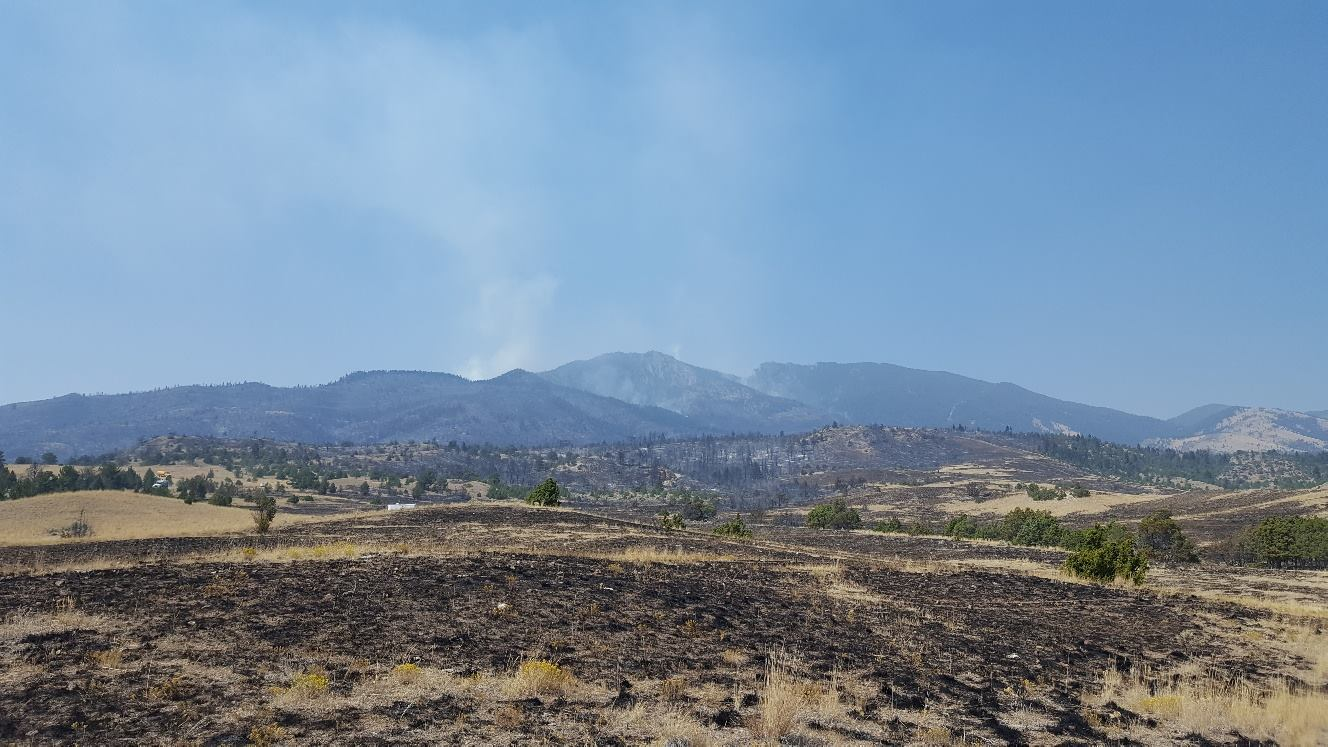
- Conrow Fire on August 31, 2017
- Date: August 24, 2017 –
- Location: Beaverhead–Deerlodge National Forest, Jefferson County, Montana, in the United States
- Coordinates: 45.934°N 111.989°W

Statistics
- Burned area: 2,741 acres (11 km^{2})

Ignition
- Cause: Lightning

Map
- Location of fire in Montana.

The Conrow Fire was a wildfire that burned seven miles northeast of Whitehall in the Beaverhead–Deerlodge National Forest in Montana in the United States. The fire was started by a lightning strike on August 24, 2017. It has burned 2,741 acres (11 km^{2}) and has threatened homes, ranches and mining operations in the area.

== Events ==
The Conrow Fire was started by a lightning strike on August 24, 2017, on private land seven miles northeast of Whitehall, Montana. By August 27, the fire had grown to 2,727 acres (11 km^{2}) and had moved onto Bureau of Land Management and United States Forest Service land in Jefferson County. The fire threatened 25 structures, including cellphone towers, mining areas, homes and cattle ranches along the Highway 69 corridor.

By the next day, the fire threatened one more structure, totaling 26 and structure assessments began in the Antelope Lane area. On August 28, a containment date of September 2 was set and two Chinook helicopters joined the firefight, dropping water on the fire. The fire began to dramatically impact air quality, with the help of other fires burning in the area, including creating the worst air quality day in two years in Butte. On August 30 the fire was declared 65% contained at 2,727 acres (11 km^{2}). Crews changed the full containment date from September 1 to September 6.

As of September 5, the fire expanded to 2,741 acres (11 km^{2}) and was 97% contained, with fire lines successfully holding the fire, despite the fire's close proximity to unburned fuels.
