= Santa Fe, New Mexico =

Capital city of New Mexico, United States

Santa Fe, New Mexico La Villa Real de la Santa Fe de San Francisco de Asís
- State capital
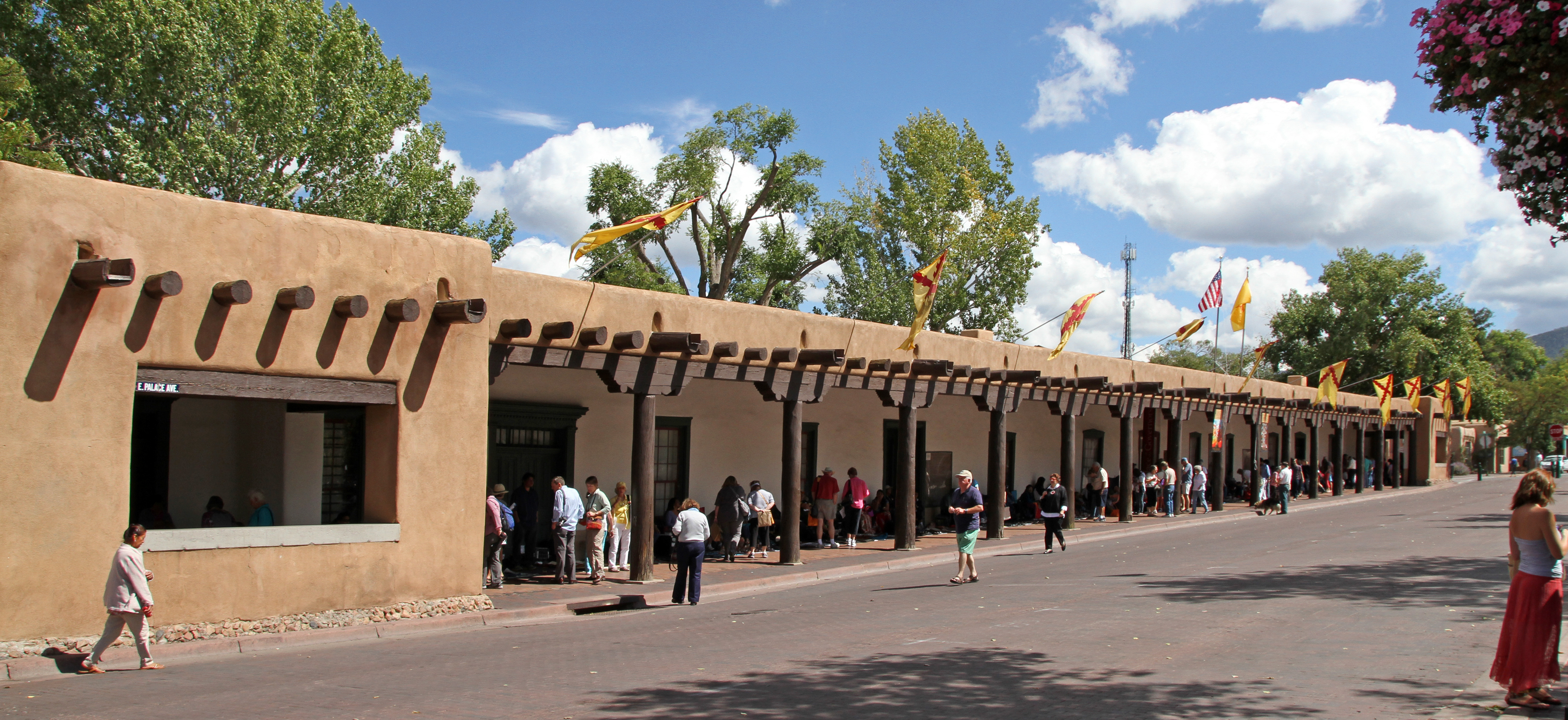
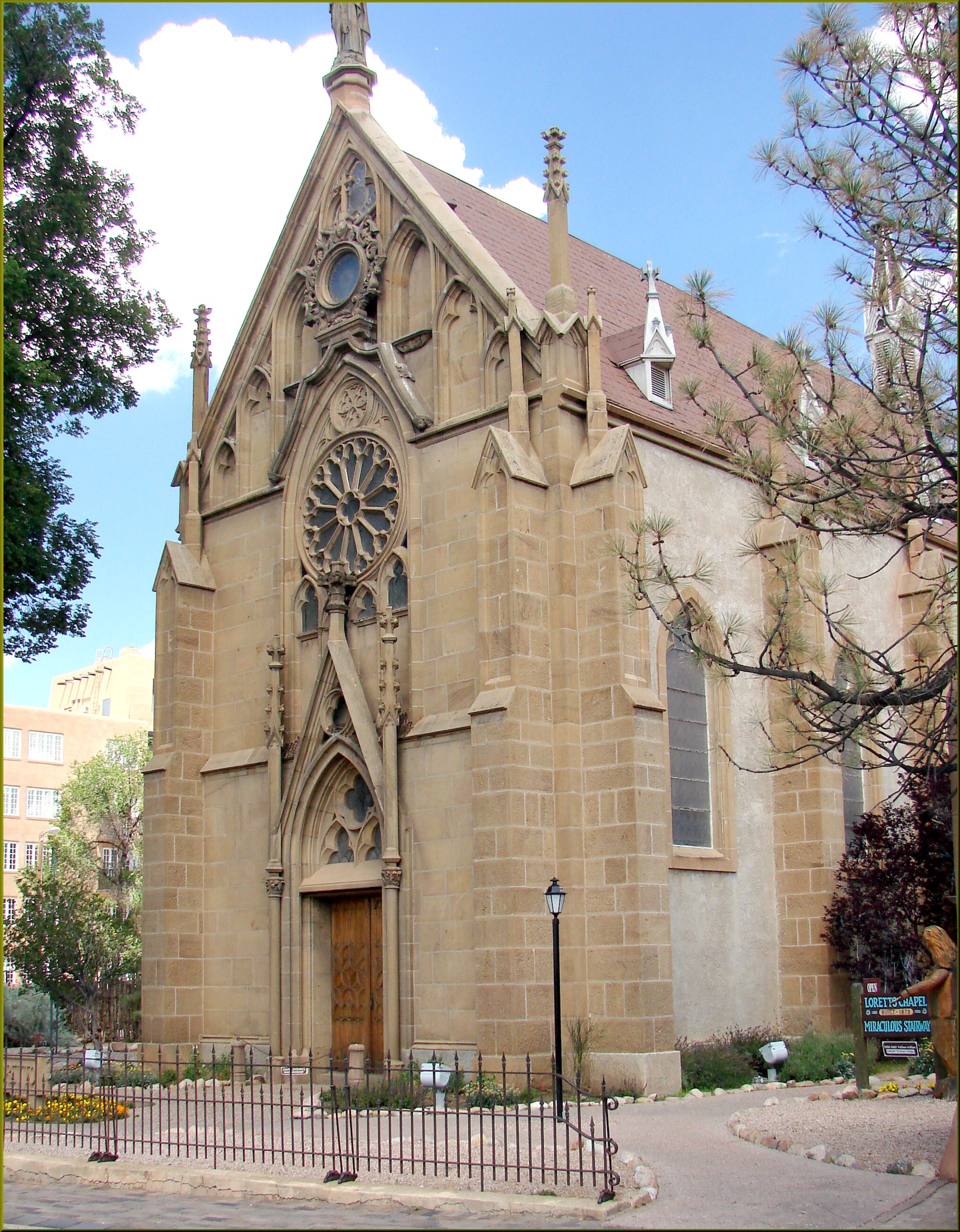
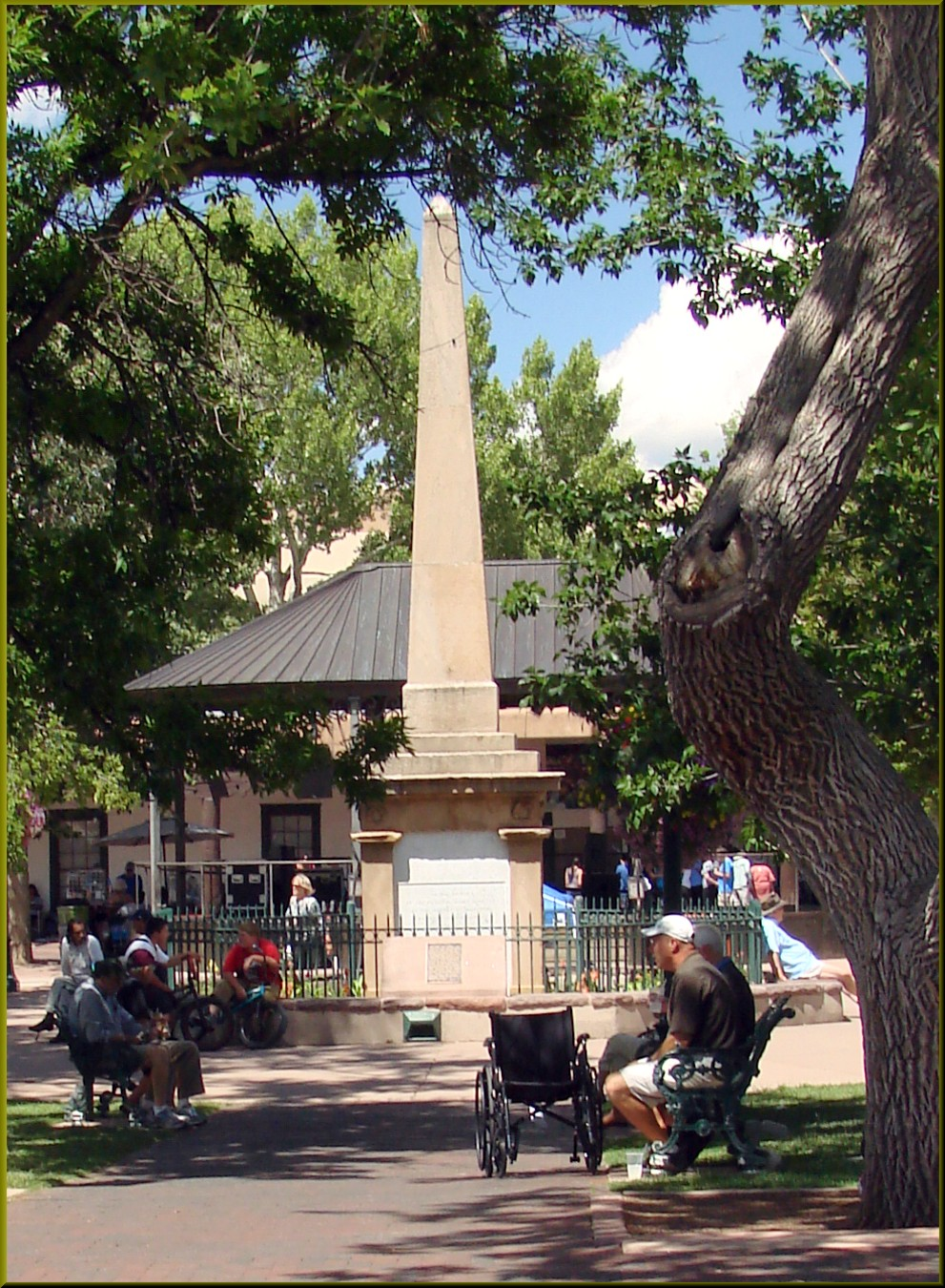
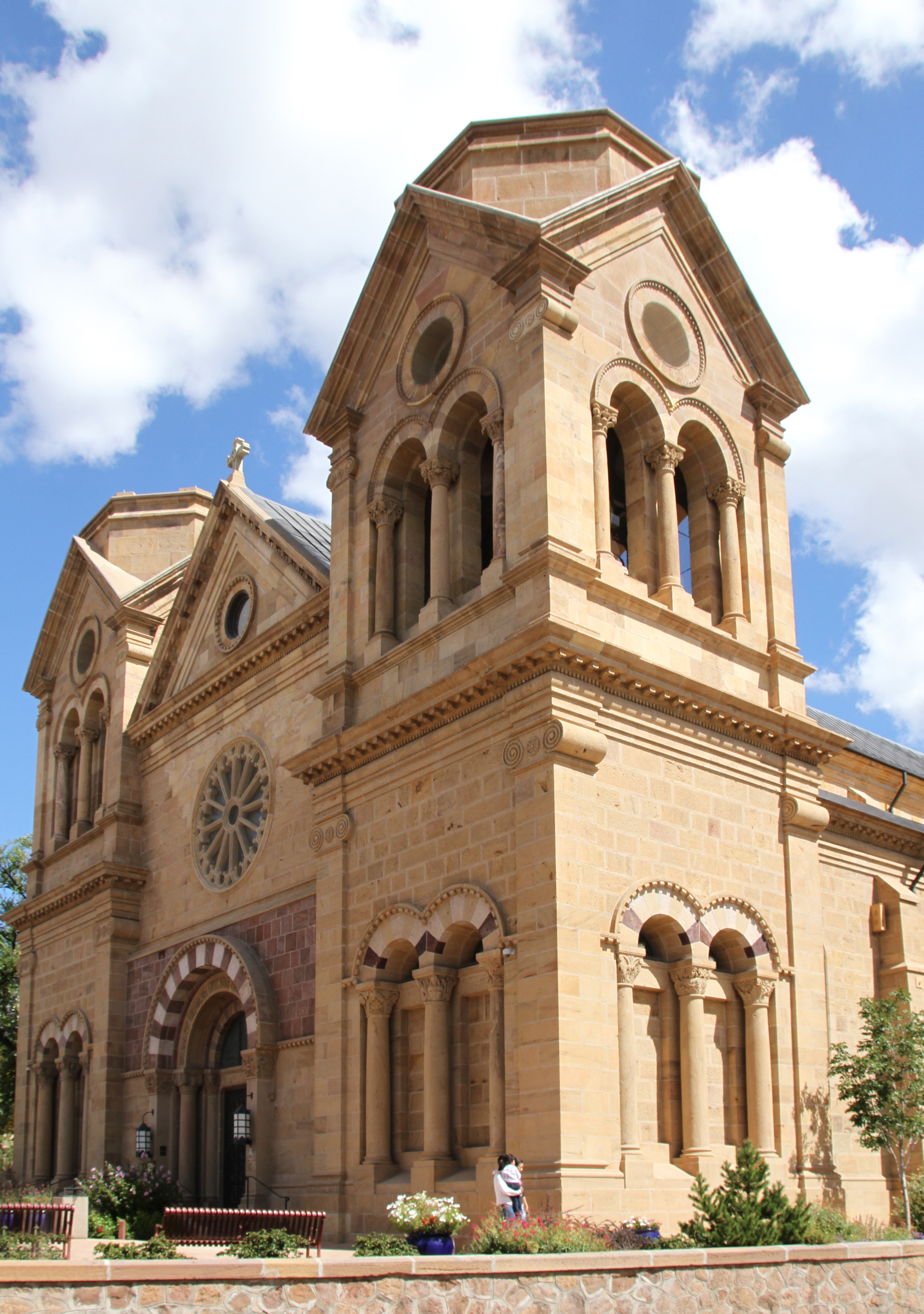
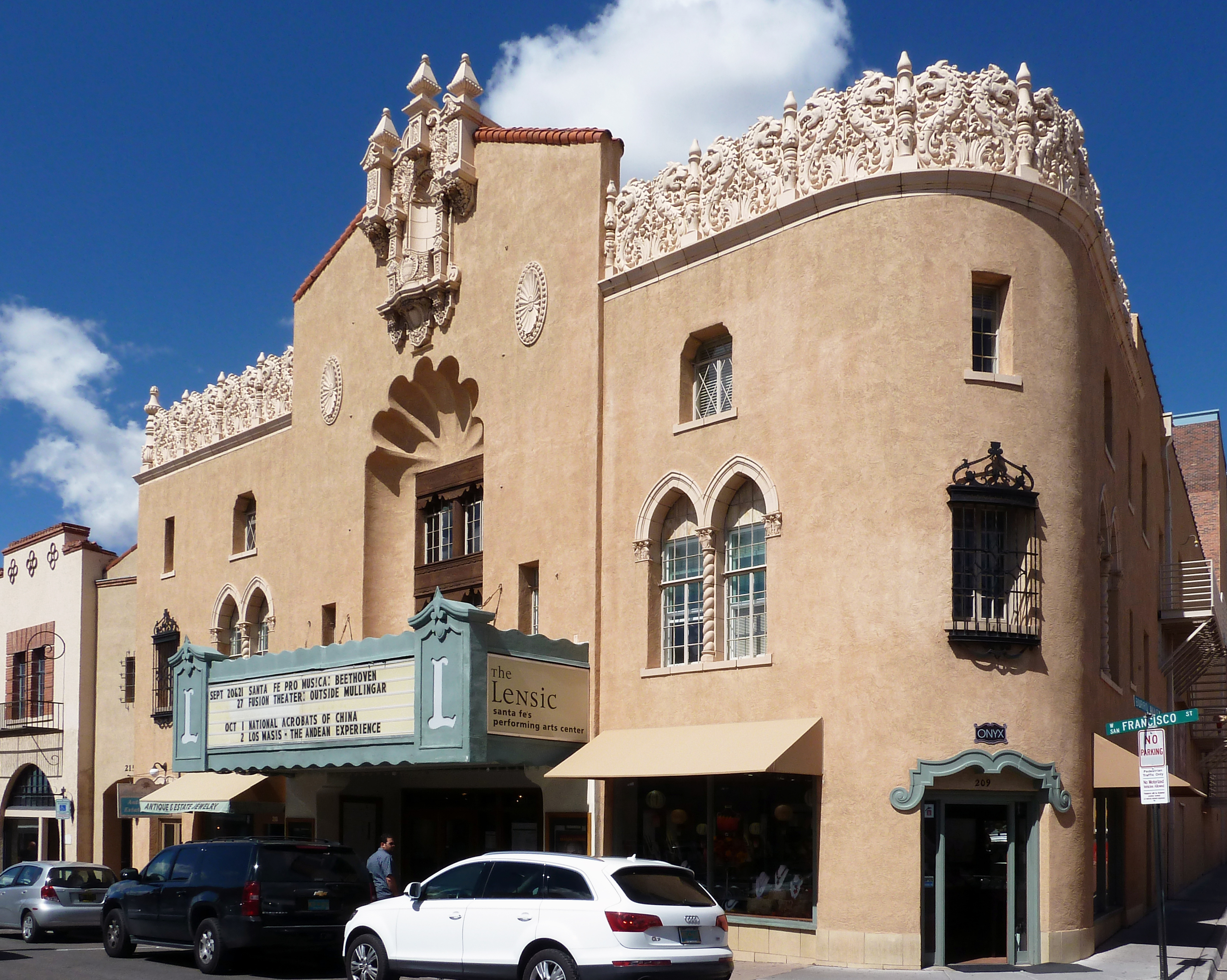
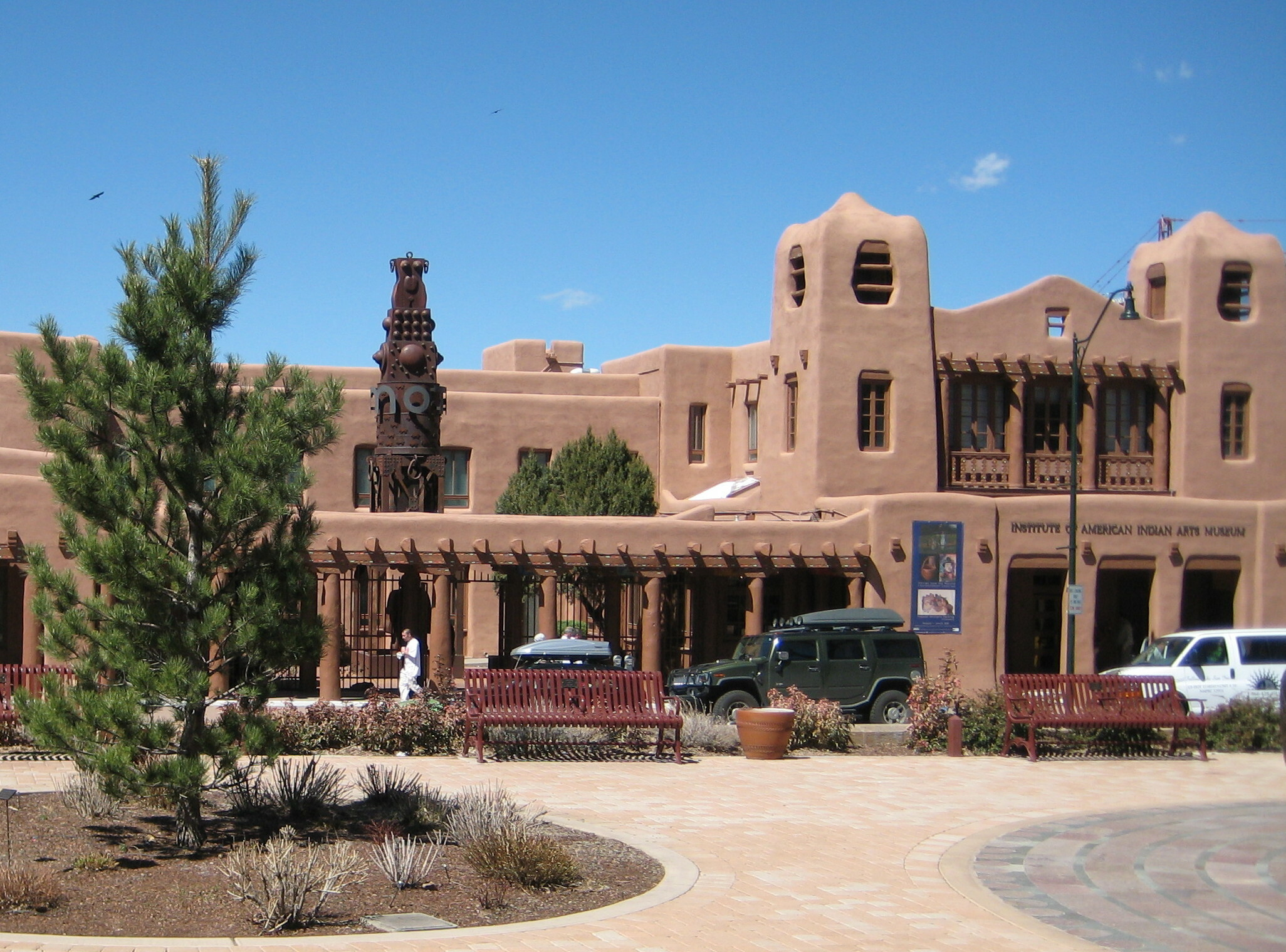
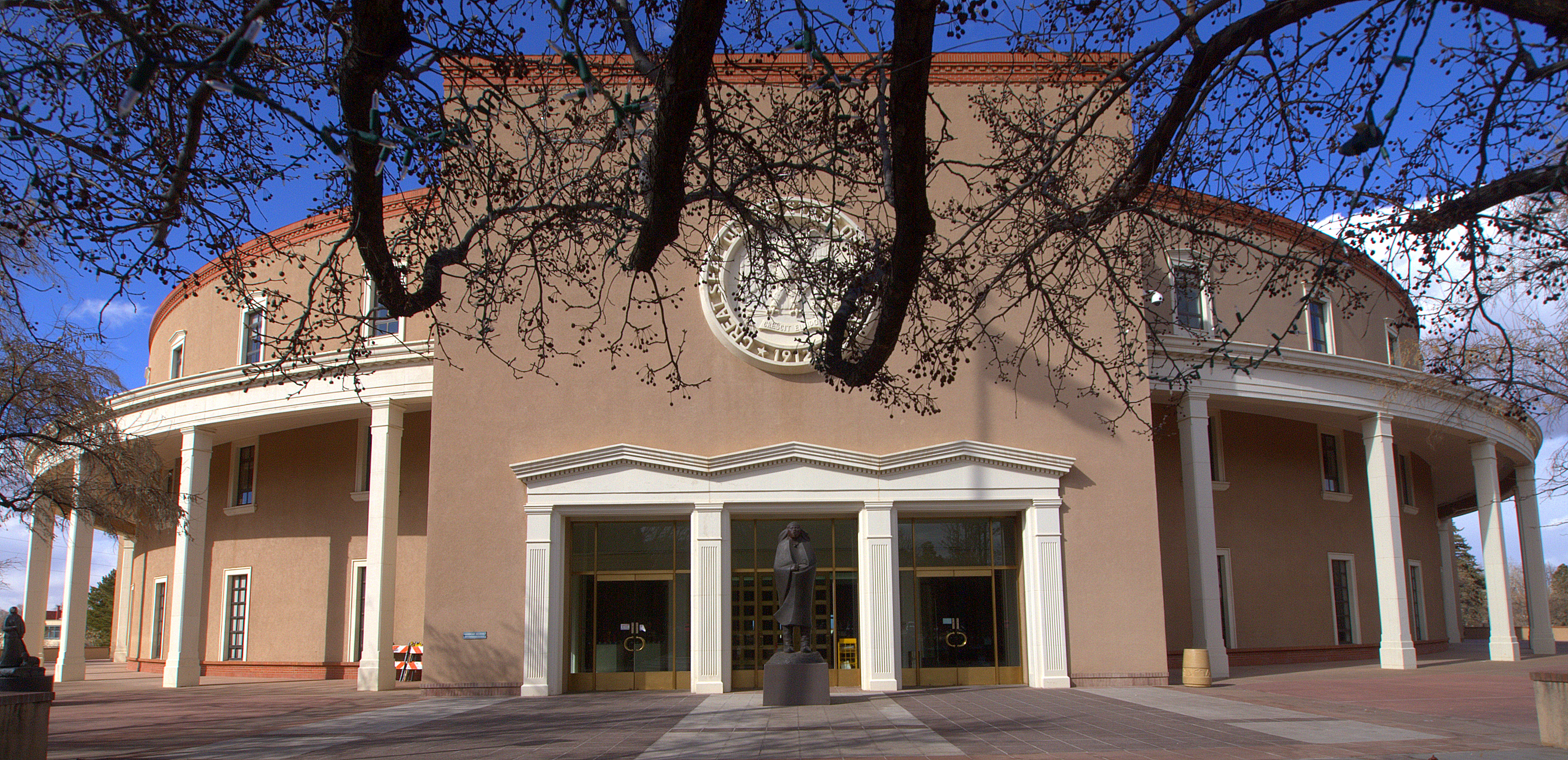
- Palace of the Governors Loretto Chapel Santa Fe Plaza Cathedral Basilica Lensic Theater IAIA Museum New Mexico State Capitol

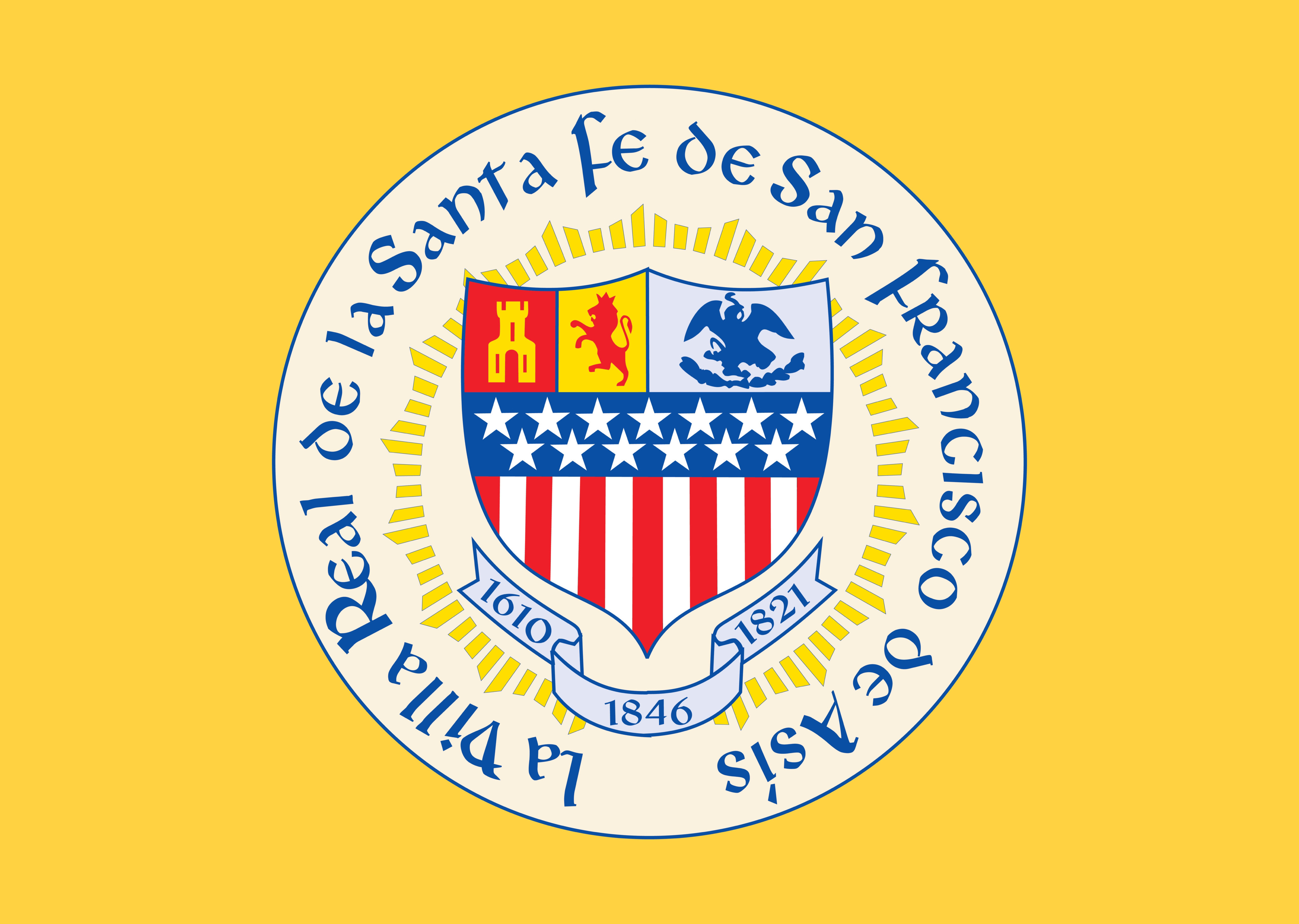
- Flag Coat of arms
- Etymology: Spanish for "Holy Faith"
- Nickname: The City Different
- Location in Santa Fe County, New Mexico

- Location within New Mexico Location within the United States
- Coordinates: 35°41′15″N 105°56′19″W
- Country: United States
- State: New Mexico
- County: Santa Fe
- Founded: 1610; 416 years ago
- Founder: Pedro de Peralta
- Named for: St. Francis of Assisi

Government
  - Mayor: Michael Garcia (D)
  - City Council: Councilors: Alma Castro; Signe I. Lindell; Michael Garcia; Carol Romero-Wirth; Pilar Faulkner; Lee Garcia; Jamie Cassutt; Amanda Chavez
  - State House: Representatives: 3 Democrats, 0 Republicans; Linda Serrato (D); Reena Szczepanski (D); Tara Lujan (D)
  - State Senate: State senators: 2 Democrats, 0 Republicans; Linda Trujillo (D); Peter Wirth (D)
  - U.S. House: Teresa Leger Fernández (D)

Area
  - City: 52.34 sq mi (135.57 km^{2})
  - Land: 52.23 sq mi (135.28 km^{2})
  - Water: 0.11 sq mi (0.29 km^{2})
- Elevation: 6,998 ft (2,133 m)

Population (2020)
  - City: 87,505
  - Rank: 4th in New Mexico
  - Density: 1,675.3/sq mi (646.83/km^{2})
  - Metro: 154,823 (US: 277th)
  - CSA: 1,162,523
- Demonym(s): Santa Fean; Santafesino, -na

GDP
  - Metro: $9.279 billion (2023)
  - Per capita: $59,933 (2023)
- Time zone: UTC−7 (MST)
  - Summer (DST): UTC−6 (MDT)
- ZIP Codes: 87501–87509, 87540, 87592, 87594
- Area code: 505
- FIPS code: 35-70500
- GNIS feature ID: 936823
- Primary airport: Santa Fe Regional Airport; KSAF (Public)
- Website: santafenm.gov

Santa Fe (/ˌsæntə ˈfeɪ, ˈsæntə ˌfeɪ/ SAN-tə FAY, - fay, Spanish: [ˈsanta ˈfe]; Spanish for 'Holy Faith') is the capital city of the U.S. state of New Mexico. It is the fourth-most populous city in the state with a population of 87,505 as of the 2020 census, while the Santa Fe metropolitan area has an estimated 158,000 people. The greater Albuquerque–Santa Fe–Los Alamos combined statistical area includes eight counties in north-central New Mexico with 1.16 million residents. The county seat of Santa Fe County, Santa Fe is situated at the foothills of the Sangre de Cristo Mountains at the highest altitude of any U.S. state capital, with an elevation of 6,998 feet (2,133 m).

Founded in 1610 as the capital of Nuevo México, a province of New Spain, Santa Fe is the oldest state capital in the United States and the earliest European settlement west of the Mississippi River. Its name, Spanish for "Holy Faith", is the shortened form of its original name, La Villa Real de la Santa Fe de San Francisco de Asís (Royal Town of the Holy Faith of Saint Francis of Assisi). The city prospered as a leading commercial and transportation hub, driven by lucrative trade and migration routes such as El Camino Real de Tierra Adentro and the Santa Fe Trail. Nuevo México became a territory of Mexico after Mexican independence from Spain in 1821. It was ceded to the United States in 1848 following the Mexican–American War, and in 1851 Santa Fe was named the capital of the U.S. Territory of New Mexico; it became New Mexico's state capital in 1912. Santa Fe remained the political and cultural center of New Mexico throughout the Spanish, Mexican, and American periods, which each impacted the city's development and character.

Blending indigenous, Spanish, and American influences, Santa Fe is considered the cultural capital of the Southwestern United States, and is widely regarded as one of the country's major art cities. In 2005, it was the first U.S. city inducted into the UNESCO Creative Cities Network. Santa Fe hosts more than 250 art galleries, a large concentration of museums, and three annual art events: the Santa Fe International Folk Art Market, the R/Traditional Spanish Colonial Market, and the Indian Market. One-tenth of all employment is related to artistic and cultural industries, with writers and authors making up the highest proportion of the labor force of any U.S. city.

Santa Fe's cultural highlights include Santa Fe Plaza, Santa Fe Historic District, the Palace of the Governors, and Fiesta de Santa Fe; the city is also known for its contributions to New Mexican cuisine and New Mexico music. Among Santa Fe's many artistic institutions are the Georgia O'Keeffe Museum, the Chuck Jones Gallery, and the art collective Meow Wolf. The cityscape is known for its adobe-style Pueblo Revival and Territorial Revival architecture, much of which is preserved and protected.

== History ==
=== Name ===
The area around present-day Santa Fe is one of a number of places named by indigenous peoples for its water access. It is commonly known to the Tewa people as Pʼoegeh (Note: also spelled Poga, Poge, Po-o-ge, etc.) (pronounced [pʼòːɡè], 'water place'), an abbreviation for both Kwʼáˀaa Pʼoegeh, (Note: pronounced [kʷʼɑ́ʔɑ̀ː pʼòːɡè], 'bead water place'; also spelled Kuapooge, Apoga, Apoge, Cua P'Hoge, Cua-P'ho-o-ge, Cua-po-oge, Cua-Po-o-que, Kua-p'o-o-ge) (used by Ohkay Owingeh) and Ogá Pʼoegeh, (Note: pronounced [ʔòɡɑ́ pʼòːɡè], 'white shell water place'; also spelled Oga P'Hoge, Og-a-p'o-ge) (used by the other Tewa-speaking pueblos), names that predate European colonization of the Americas. The Navajo people refer to the area as Yootó ("bead" + "water place").

In 1598, Juan de Oñate established the area as Santa Fe de Nuevo México, a province of New Spain. Formal Spanish settlements were developed leading the colonial governor Pedro de Peralta to rename the area La Villa Real de la Santa Fé de San Francisco de Asís ("the Royal Town of the Holy Faith of Saint Francis of Assisi").

Nicknames include "The City of Holy Faith", "The City Different" (promoted by the New Mexico Tourism Department) and in the 1800s, "The Ancient", "The Aztec Ruin", "Coronado's Camp" (despite the area of Bernalillo, New Mexico being the closest the Coronado expedition came to what is now Santa Fe), and others.

=== Early history ===
The area of Santa Fe was originally occupied by indigenous Tanoan peoples, who lived in numerous Pueblo villages along the Rio Grande. One of the earliest known settlements in what is known as downtown Santa Fe today came sometime after 900 AD. A group of native Tewa built a cluster of homes that centered around the site of today's Plaza and spread for 1/2 mile (800 m) to the south and west; the village was called Ogá Pʼoegeh in Tewa. The Tanoans and other Pueblo peoples settled along the Santa Fe River from the mid-11th to mid-12th centuries, but had abandoned the site for at least 200 years by the time Spanish arrived in the early 17th century.

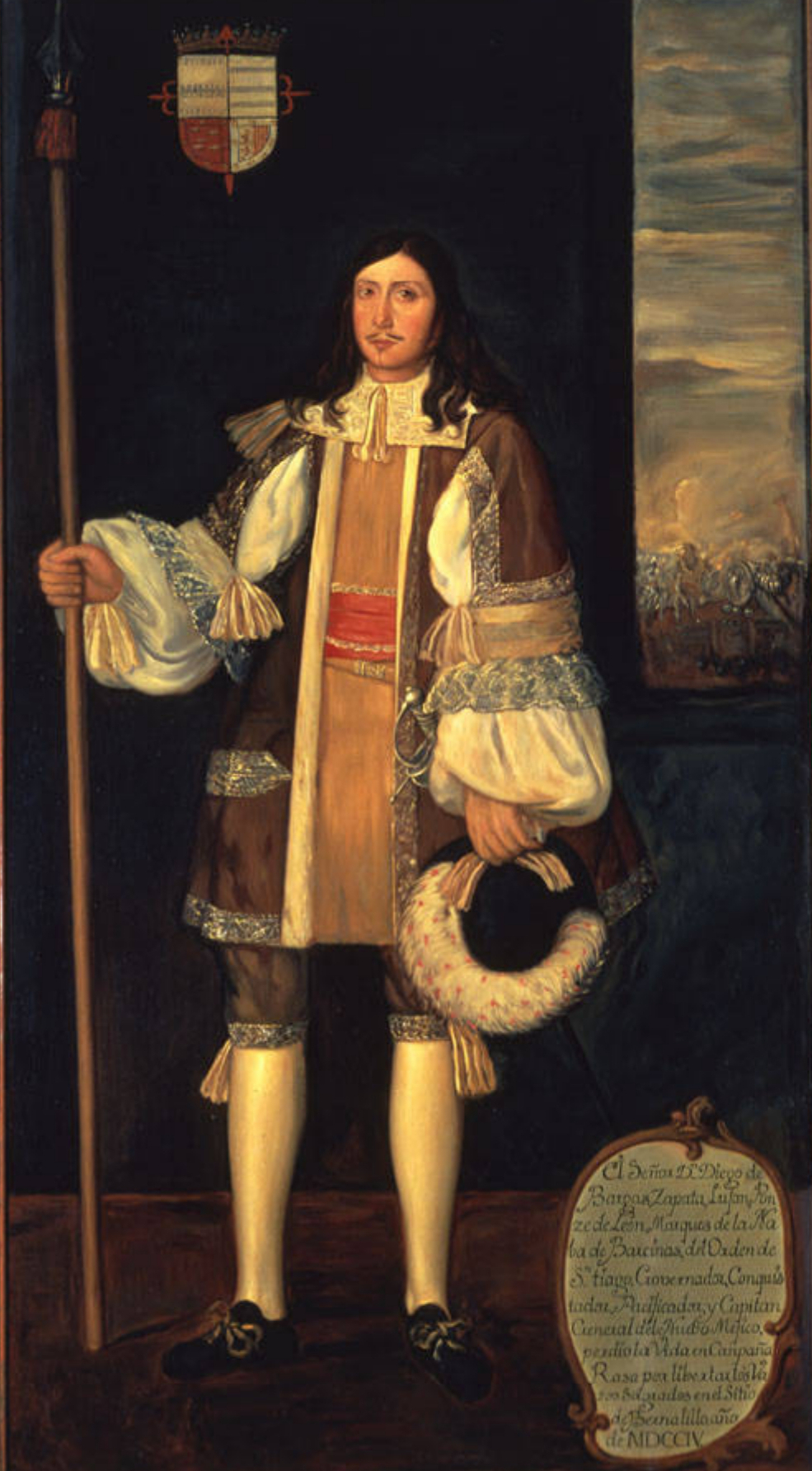
In 1692, Diego de Vargas reconquered Santa Fe after the Pueblo Revolt, famously without spilling blood. This is commemorated every year in the Fiestas de Santa Fe.

=== Spanish era ===
Don Juan de Oñate led the first Spanish effort to colonize the region in 1598, establishing Santa Fe de Nuevo México as a province of New Spain. Under Juan de Oñate and his son, the capital of the province was the settlement of San Juan de los Caballeros north of Santa Fe near modern Ohkay Owingeh Pueblo. Juan de Oñate was banished and exiled from New Mexico by the Spanish, after his rule was deemed cruel towards the indigenous population.

New Mexico's second Spanish governor, Don Pedro de Peralta, however, founded a new city at the foot of the Sangre de Cristo Mountains in 1607, which he called La Villa Real de la Santa Fé de San Francisco de Asís, the Royal Town of the Holy Faith of Saint Francis of Assisi. In 1610, he designated it as the capital of the province, which it has almost constantly remained, making it the oldest state capital in the United States.

Lack of Native American representation within the province of Santa Fe de Nuevo México, New Spain (current New Mexico's early government) led to the 1680 Pueblo Revolt, when groups of different Native Pueblo peoples were successful in driving the Spaniards out of New Mexico to El Paso. The Pueblo people continued running New Mexico from the Palace of the Governors in Santa Fe from 1680 to 1692, building the village of Thanugeh Ówîngeh Kayyee atop its ruins.

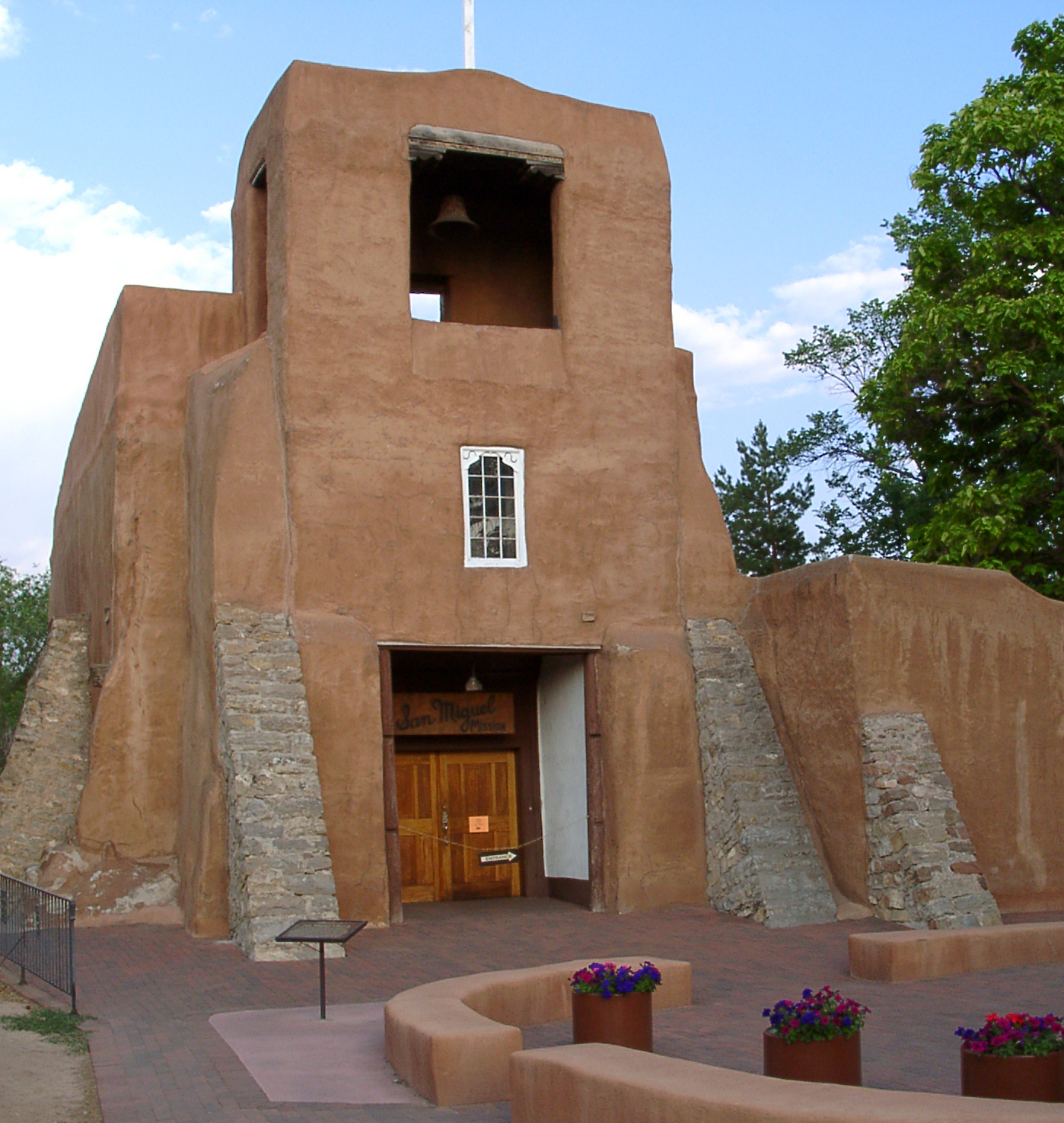
San Miguel Mission, built 1610, is the oldest church in the United States.

The territory was reconquered in 1692 by Don Diego de Vargas through the so-called "Bloodless Reconquest", which was criticized as violent even at the time. The next governor, Francisco Cuervo y Valdez, started to broker peace, including the founding of Albuquerque, to guarantee better representation and trade access for Pueblos in New Mexico's government. Other governors of New Mexico, such as Tomás Vélez Cachupin, continued to be better known for their more forward-thinking work with the indigenous population of New Mexico.

=== Mexican era ===
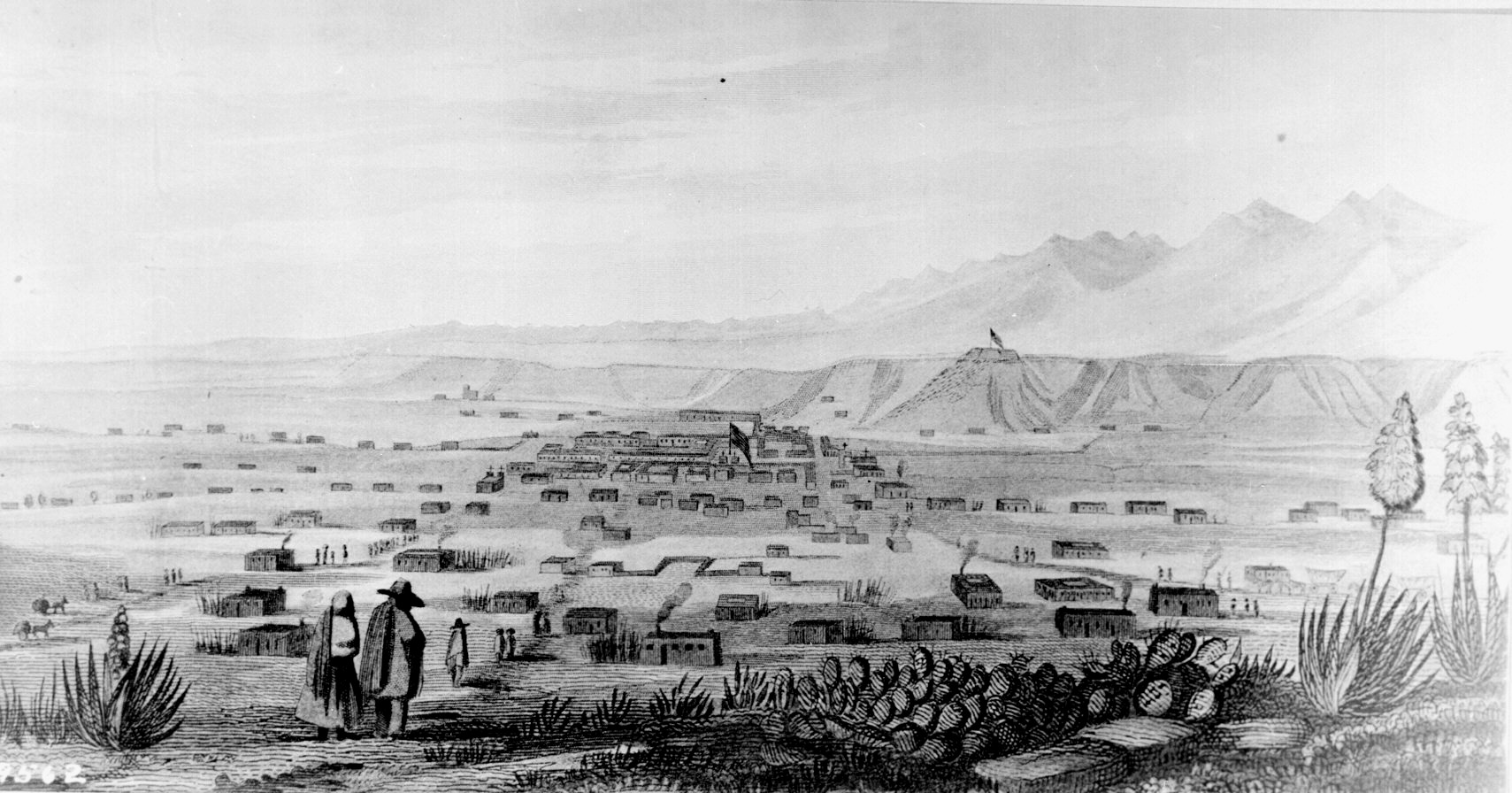
Santa Fe in 1846, then a Mexican territorial capital, approaching the onset of the Mexican-American War

Santa Fe was Spain's provincial seat at outbreak of the Mexican War of Independence in 1810. The city's status as the capital of the Mexican territory of Santa Fe de Nuevo México was formalized in the 1824 Constitution after Mexico achieved independence from Spain.

In addition to remaining the administrative and political heart of Nuevo Mexico, Santa Fe maintained its status as the central trading and transportation hub west of the Mississippi. Beginning in the 1820s, the Santa Fe Trail brought lucrative commercial links to what was then the American frontier in Missouri, attracting both indigenous and Euro-American traders. The opening of trade and migration with the U.S. also facilitated friendly relations between the new Mexican republic and its American counterpart, for which Santa Fe was the primary nexus.

During that period, it was the site designated for the operation of the District Court of the Territory of New Mexico (Juzgado de Distrito del Territorio de Nuevo México), which existed from 1832, when José María Nájera, the first and only appointed judge who managed to reach Santa Fe, took possession of the court, and de facto conclusion in 1837 when Santiago Abreu, substitute judge, was murdered, and de jure in 1841, when Antonio López de Santa Anna ordered its closure.

When the Republic of Texas seceded from Mexico in 1836, it attempted to claim Santa Fe and other parts of Nuevo México as part of the western portion of Texas along the Río Grande. In 1841, a small military and trading expedition set out from Austin, intending to take control of the Santa Fe Trail. Known as the Texan Santa Fe Expedition, the force was poorly prepared and easily captured by the New Mexican military.

Notwithstanding these incursions, as well as recurring conflicts between Euro-American settlers and native peoples, Santa Fe witnessed multiple migrations through the three trails that led to the city, which would give way to the railroad, Route 66, and the interstate.

=== American era ===
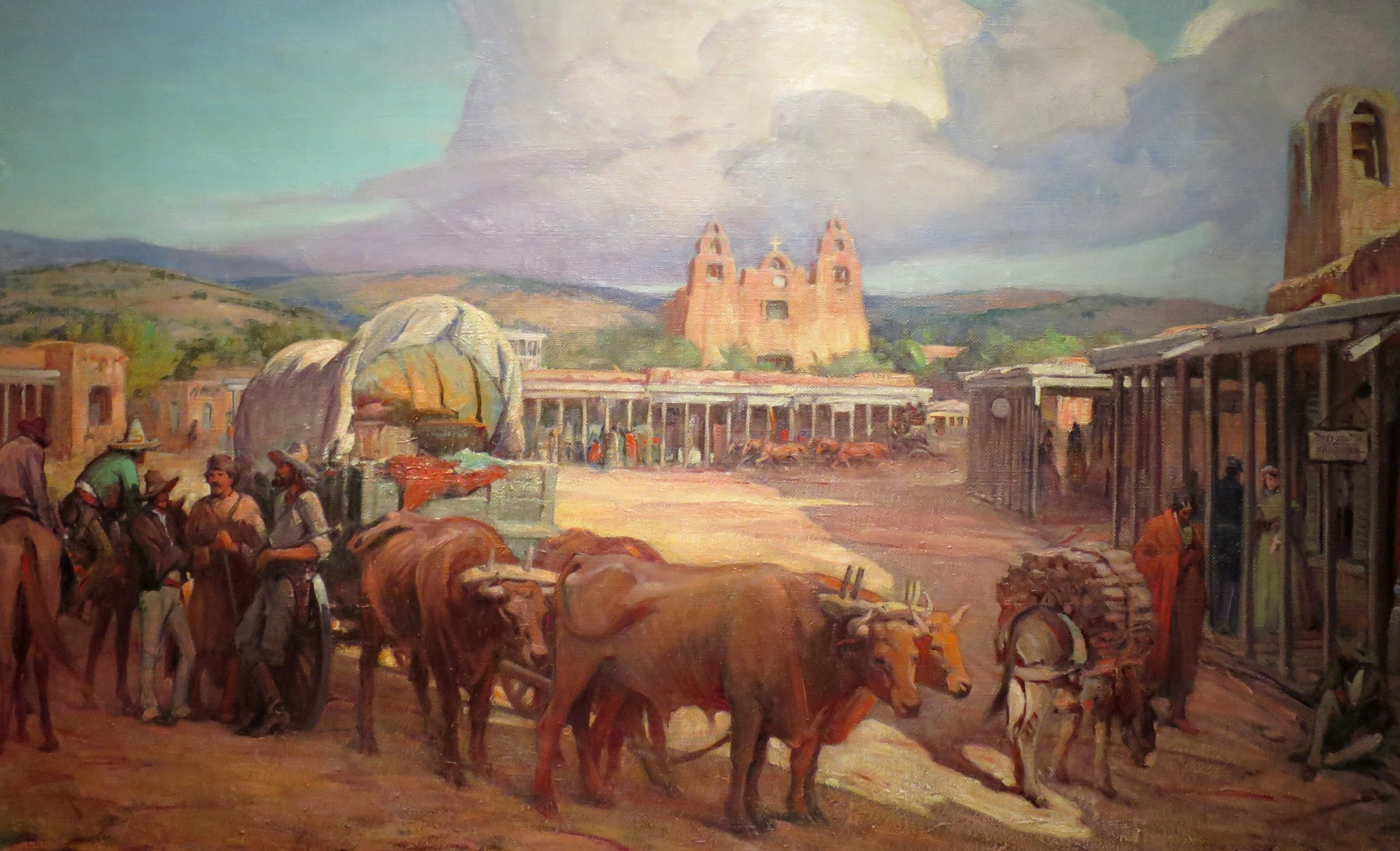
Santa Fe Plaza c. 1850, after the Mexican Cession to the United States

In 1846, the United States declared war on Mexico. Brigadier General Stephen W. Kearny led the main body of his Army of the West of some 1,700 soldiers that invaded Santa Fe to wrest it and the whole New Mexico Territory from Mexico for the United States. By 1848, the U.S. officially gained New Mexico through the Treaty of Guadalupe Hidalgo, which forced Mexico to relinquish 55% of its territory that now constitutes the US states of California, Nevada, Utah, Arizona, and so on.

Colonel Alexander William Doniphan, under the command of Kearny, recovered ammunition from Santa Fe labeled "Spain 1776" showing both the lack of communications and quality of military support New Mexico received under Mexican rule.

In 1846, following the annexation of Texas, they claimed Santa Fe along with other territory in eastern New Mexico. Texas Governor Peter H. Bell sent a letter to President Zachary Taylor, who died before he could read it, demanding that the U.S. Army stop defending New Mexico. In response, Taylor's successor Millard Fillmore stationed additional troops to the area to halt any incursion by the Texas Militia. Territorial claims were also brought by the California Republic and State of Deseret each claiming parts of western New Mexico. These territorial disputes were finally resolved by the Compromise of 1850, which designated the 103rd meridian west as Texas's western border and resulted in California's statehood, and the establishment of the land claims of the Utah and New Mexico Territory.

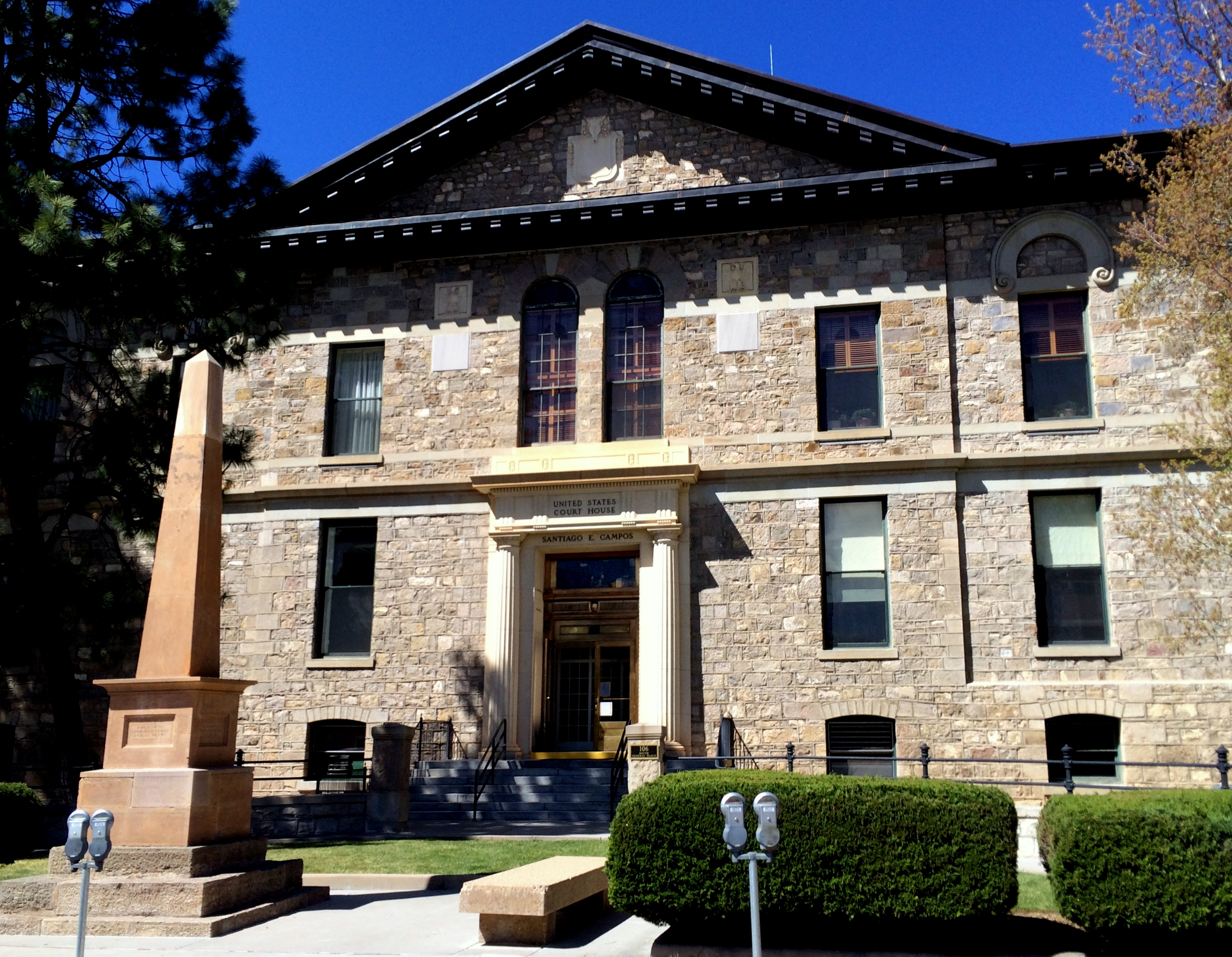
Campos Courthouse, built 1853-89

Some American visitors at first saw little promise in the remote town. One traveller in 1849 wrote:

I can hardly imagine how Santa Fe is supported. The country around it is barren. At the North stands a snow-capped mountain while the valley in which the town is situated is drab and sandy. The streets are narrow .... A Mexican will walk about town all day to sell a bundle of grass worth about a dime. They are the poorest looking people I ever saw. They subsist principally on mutton, onions and red pepper.

In 1851, Jean Baptiste Lamy arrived, becoming bishop of New Mexico, Arizona, Utah, and Colorado in 1853. During his leadership, he traveled to France, Rome, Tucson, Los Angeles, St. Louis, New Orleans, and Mexico City. He built the Santa Fe Saint Francis Cathedral and shaped Catholicism in the region until his death in 1888.

As part of the New Mexico Campaign of the Civil War, General Henry Sibley occupied the city, flying the Confederate flag over Santa Fe for a few days in March 1862. Sibley was forced to withdraw after Union troops destroyed his logistical trains following the Battle of Glorieta Pass. The Santa Fe National Cemetery was created by the federal government after the war in 1870 to inter the Union soldiers who died fighting there.

On October 21, 1887, Anton Docher, "The Padre of Isleta", went to New Mexico where he was ordained as a priest in the St Francis Cathedral of Santa Fe by Bishop Jean-Baptiste Salpointe. After a few years serving in Santa Fe, Bernalillo and Taos, he moved to Isleta on December 28, 1891. He wrote an ethnological article published in The Santa Fé Magazine in June 1913, in which he describes early 20th century life in the Pueblos.

As railroads were extended into the West, Santa Fe was originally envisioned as an important stop on the Atchison, Topeka and Santa Fe Railway. But as the tracks were constructed into New Mexico, the civil engineers decided that it was more practical to go through Lamy, a town in Santa Fe County to the south of Santa Fe. A branch line was completed from Lamy to Santa Fe in 1880. The Denver and Rio Grande Western Railroad extended the narrow gauge Chili Line from the nearby city of Española to Santa Fe in 1886. The Territory of New Mexico incorporated the City of Santa Fe on June 17, 1891.

Neither was sufficient to offset the negative effects of Santa Fe's having been bypassed by the main railroad route. It suffered gradual economic decline into the early 20th century. Activists created a number of resources for the arts and archaeology, notably the School of American Research, created in 1907 under the leadership of the prominent archaeologist Edgar Lee Hewett. In the early 20th century, Santa Fe became a base for numerous writers and artists. The first airplane to fly over Santa Fe was piloted by Rose Dugan, carrying Vera von Blumenthal as passenger. Together the two women started the development of the Pueblo Indian pottery industry, helping Native women to market their wares. They contributed to the founding of the annual Santa Fe Indian Market.

=== 20th century ===
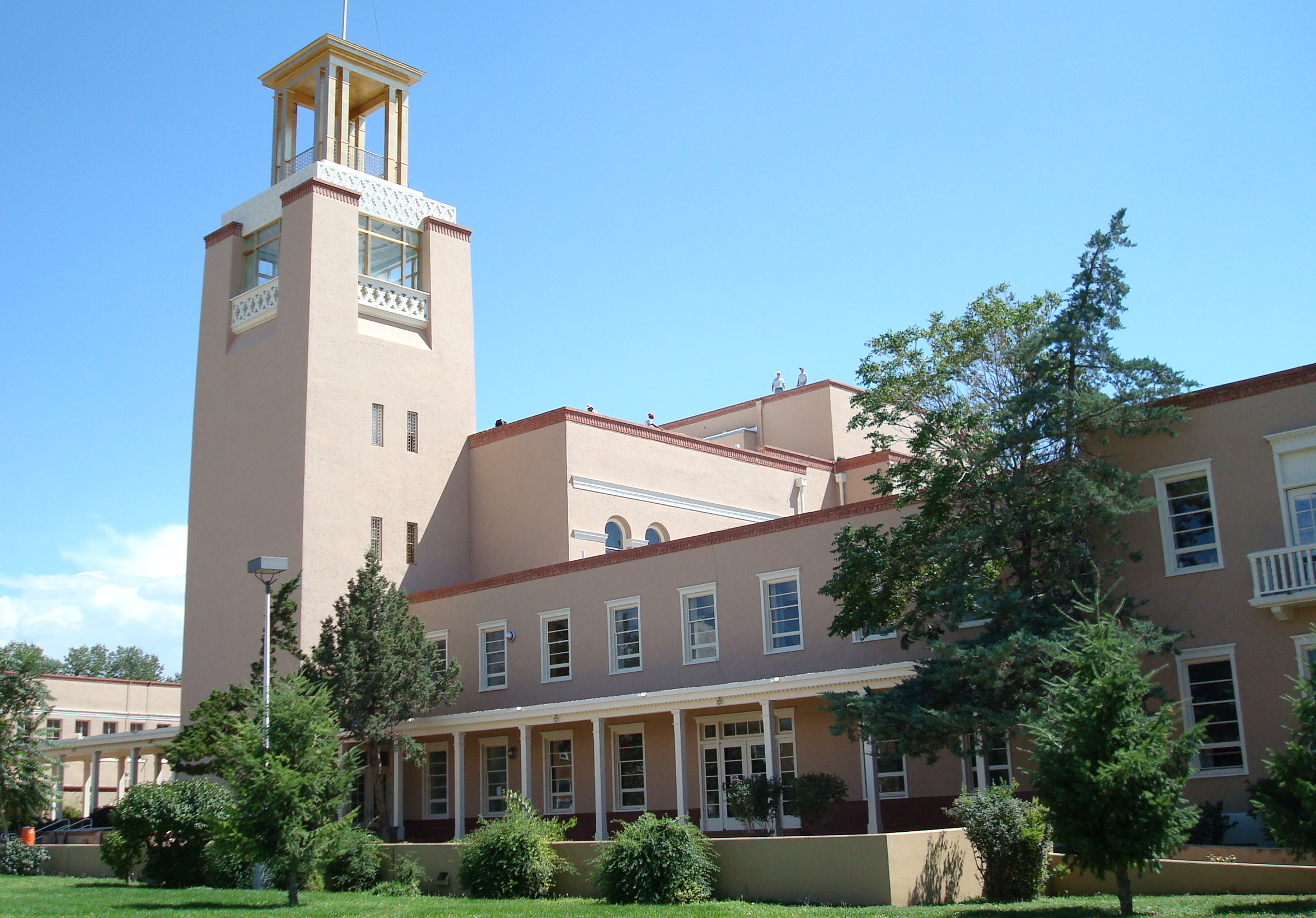
Built in 1900, the Bataan Building served as the New Mexico's first state capitol following statehood in 1912.

In 1912, New Mexico was admitted as the 47th U.S. state, with Santa Fe as its capital. At this time, with an approximate population of 5,000 people, the city's civic leaders designed and enacted a sophisticated city plan that incorporated elements of the contemporary City Beautiful movement, city planning, and historic preservation. The latter was particularly influenced by similar movements in Germany. The plan anticipated limited future growth, considered the scarcity of water, and recognized the future prospects of suburban development on the outskirts. The planners foresaw that its development must be in harmony with the city's character.

After the mainline of the railroad bypassed Santa Fe, it lost population. However, artists and writers, as well as retirees, were attracted to the cultural richness of the area, the beauty of the landscapes, and its dry climate. Local leaders began promoting the city as a tourist attraction. The city sponsored architectural restoration projects and erected new buildings according to traditional techniques and styles, thus creating the Santa Fe Style.

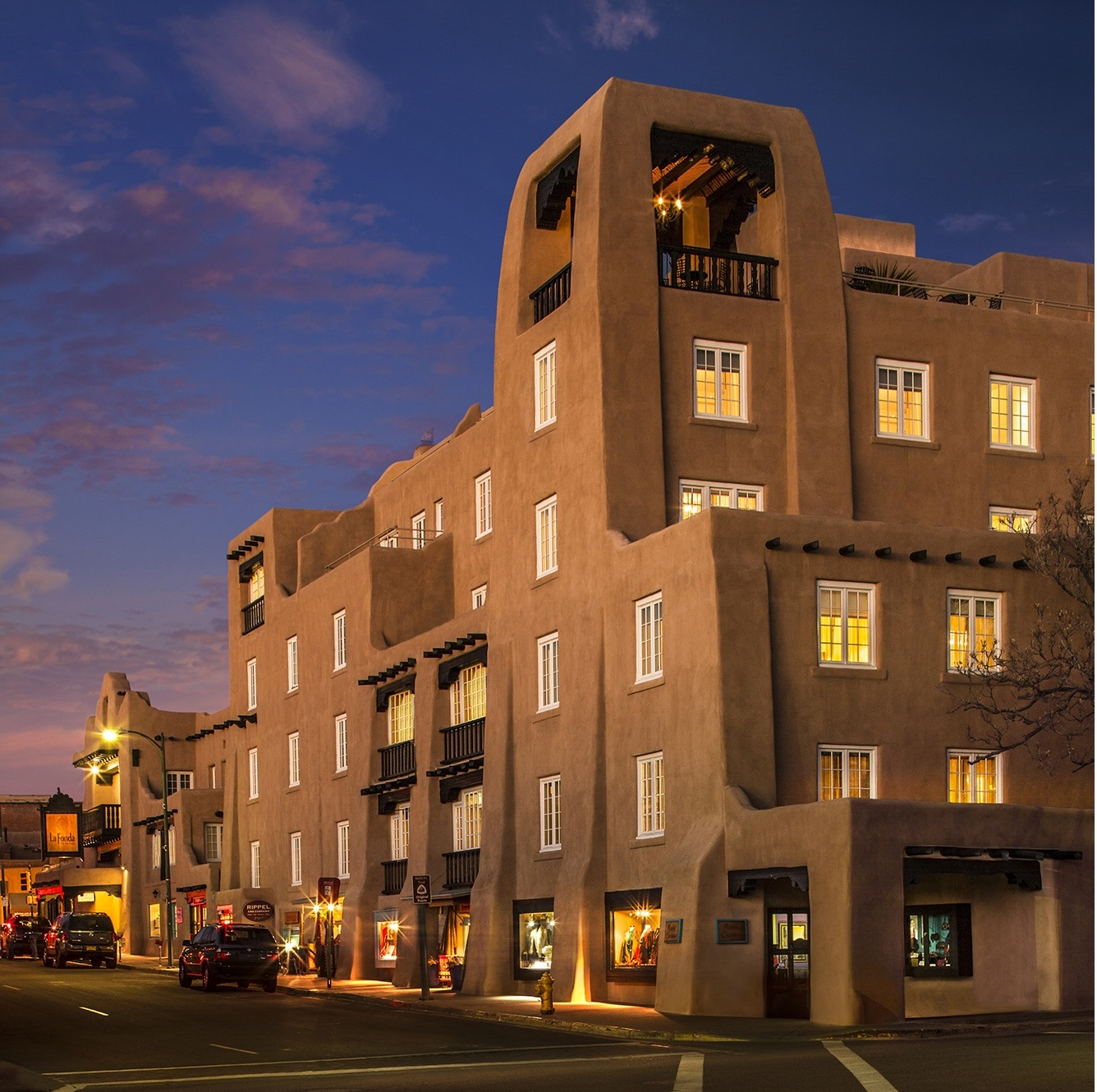
La Fonda on the Plaza, a historic Pueblo Revival hotel built in 1922

Edgar L. Hewett, founder and first director of the School of American Research and the Museum of New Mexico in Santa Fe, was a leading promoter. He began the Santa Fe Fiesta in 1919 and the Southwest Indian Fair in 1922 (now known as the Indian Market). When Hewett tried to attract a summer program for Texas women, many artists rebelled, saying the city should not promote artificial tourism at the expense of its artistic culture. The writers and artists formed the Old Santa Fe Association and defeated the plan.

==== Japanese-American internment camp ====
New Mexico voted against interning any of its citizens of Japanese heritage, so none of the Japanese New Mexicans were interned during World War II. During World War II, the federal government ordered a Japanese-American internment camp to be established. Beginning in June 1942, the Department of Justice arrested 826 Japanese-American men after the attack on Pearl Harbor; they held them near Santa Fe, in a former Civilian Conservation Corps site that had been acquired and expanded for the purpose. Although there was a lack of evidence and no due process, the men were held on suspicion of fifth column activity. Security at Santa Fe was similar to a military prison, with twelve-foot barbed wire fences, guard towers equipped with searchlights, and guards carrying rifles, side arms and tear gas. By September, the internees had been transferred to other facilities—523 to War Relocation Authority concentration camps in the interior of the West, and 302 to Army internment camps.

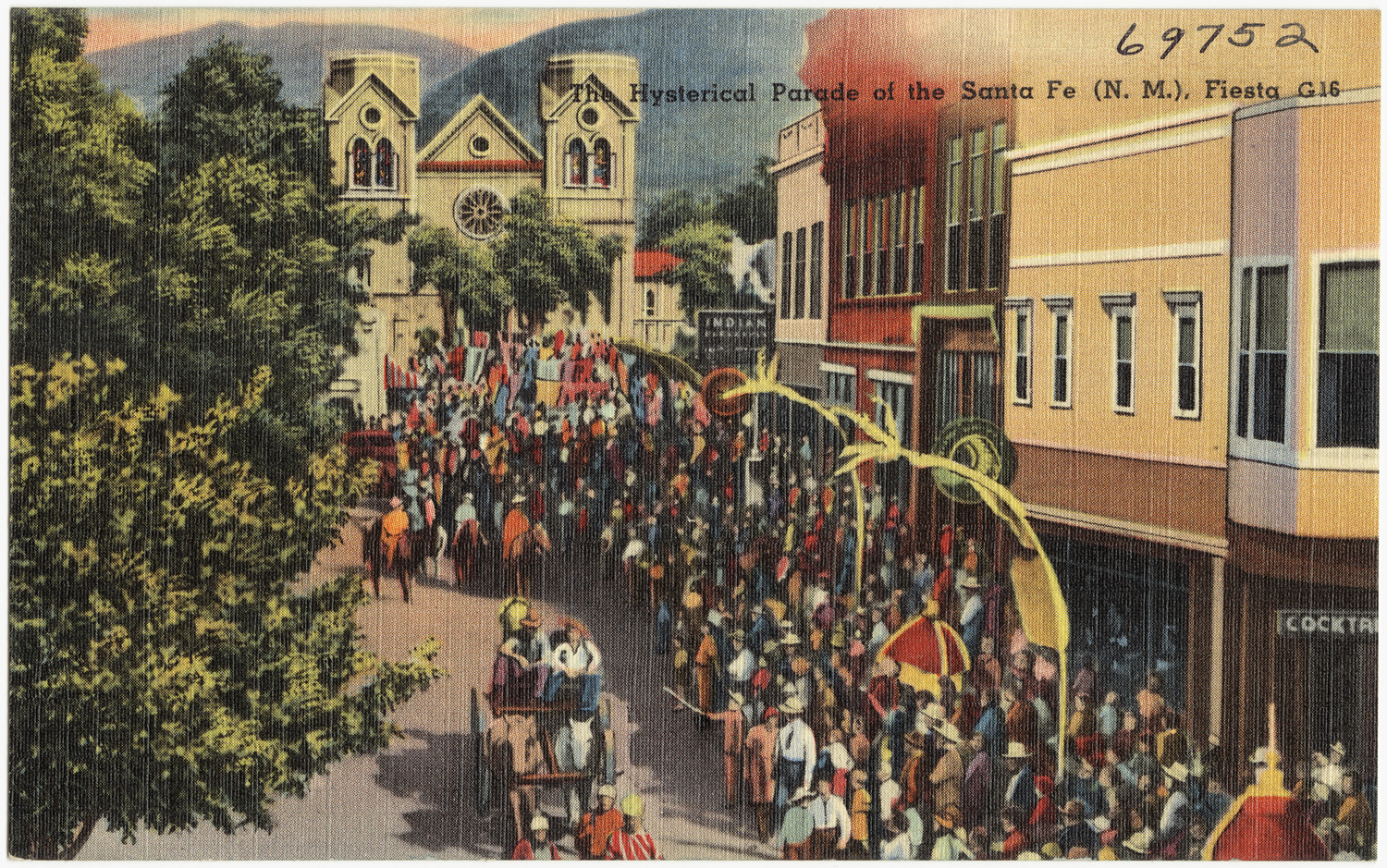
The Fiestas de Santa Fe, c. 1930

The Santa Fe site was used next to hold German and Italian nationals, who were considered enemy aliens after the outbreak of war. In February 1943, these civilian detainees were transferred to Department of Justice custody.

The camp was expanded at that time to take in 2,100 men segregated from the general population of Japanese-American inmates. These were mostly Nisei and Kibei who renounced their U.S. citizenship rather than sign an oath to "give up loyalty to the Japanese emperor" (offending them, since they had no identification with the emperor and were being asked to enlist in fighting him while their Japanese-born parents were interned) and other "troublemakers" from the Tule Lake Segregation Center. In 1945, four internees were seriously injured when violence broke out between the internees and guards in an event known as the Santa Fe Riot. The camp remained open past the end of the war; the last detainees were released in mid-1946. The facility was closed and sold as surplus soon after. The site is part of what is today the Casa Solana neighborhood.

=== 21st century ===
Corresponding to nationwide trends, Santa Fe has faced increasing challenges in affordability, with average rent growing by more than 40 percent from 2016 to 2021. In November 2025, Santa Fe became the first city in the United States to pass an ordinance that directly links wages to housing affordability, in an effort to address high rents and housing prices. Beginning in 2027, the city's minimum wage will be increased to $17.50 and will thereafter be increased annually based on a formula that combines the Consumer Price Index and fair market rent data.

== Geography ==
The Santa Fe River in downtown

According to the United States Census Bureau, Santa Fe has a total area of 52.4 square miles (135.6 square kilometers), of which 52.2 sq mi (135.3 km^{2}) are land and 0.12 sq mi (0.3 km^{2}), or 0.21%, is covered by water; much of the liquid surface consists of the Santa Fe River and the arroyos of Santa Fe, which drain the region to the Rio Grande at Cochiti Dam. Located at 7,199 feet (2,194 m) above sea level, Santa Fe is the highest state capital in the United States.

=== Climate ===
Santa Fe's climate is characterized by cool, dry winters, hot summers, and relatively low precipitation. According to the Köppen climate classification, the city has a cold semi-arid climate (BSk), due to its elevation. The 24-hour average temperature in the city ranges from 30.3 °F (−0.9 °C) in December to 70.1 °F (21.2 °C) in July. Due to the relative aridity and elevation, average diurnal temperature variation exceeds 25 °F (14 °C) in every month, and 30 °F (17 °C) much of the year. The city usually receives six to eight snowfalls a year between November and April with snowfall being most prevalent in December with 17 cm (6.7 in). The heaviest rainfall occurs in July and August, with the arrival of the North American Monsoon. Rainfall is lowest in February with 12 mm (0.47 in) and at its most in July with 55 mm (2.2 in).

Climate data for Santa Fe, New Mexico (1991–2020 normals, extremes 1874–present), elevation 6,998 ft (2,133 m)
Month	Jan	Feb	Mar	Apr	May	Jun	Jul	Aug	Sep	Oct	Nov	Dec	Year
Record high °F (°C)	76 (24)	75 (24)	86 (30)	84 (29)	96 (36)	99 (37)	99 (37)	98 (37)	94 (34)	87 (31)	77 (25)	66 (19)	99 (37)
Mean maximum °F (°C)	56.3 (13.5)	61.5 (16.4)	70.9 (21.6)	77.7 (25.4)	86.1 (30.1)	94.6 (34.8)	94.8 (34.9)	91.7 (33.2)	87.4 (30.8)	79.7 (26.5)	67.3 (19.6)	56.3 (13.5)	96.1 (35.6)
Mean daily maximum °F (°C)	43.0 (6.1)	48.0 (8.9)	56.6 (13.7)	64.3 (17.9)	73.7 (23.2)	84.1 (28.9)	85.8 (29.9)	83.4 (28.6)	77.5 (25.3)	66.3 (19.1)	53.0 (11.7)	42.6 (5.9)	64.9 (18.3)
Daily mean °F (°C)	30.4 (−0.9)	34.7 (1.5)	41.5 (5.3)	48.3 (9.1)	57.3 (14.1)	67.1 (19.5)	70.5 (21.4)	68.6 (20.3)	62.1 (16.7)	50.8 (10.4)	38.7 (3.7)	30.1 (−1.1)	50.0 (10.0)
Mean daily minimum °F (°C)	17.9 (−7.8)	21.3 (−5.9)	26.4 (−3.1)	32.4 (0.2)	40.8 (4.9)	50.1 (10.1)	55.1 (12.8)	53.7 (12.1)	46.8 (8.2)	35.4 (1.9)	24.4 (−4.2)	17.6 (−8.0)	35.2 (1.8)
Mean minimum °F (°C)	1.9 (−16.7)	5.7 (−14.6)	10.7 (−11.8)	19.1 (−7.2)	26.9 (−2.8)	37.8 (3.2)	46.6 (8.1)	45.3 (7.4)	34.3 (1.3)	20.3 (−6.5)	8.3 (−13.2)	−0.1 (−17.8)	−4.1 (−20.1)
Record low °F (°C)	−18 (−28)	−24 (−31)	−6 (−21)	3 (−16)	19 (−7)	28 (−2)	37 (3)	36 (2)	21 (−6)	5 (−15)	−12 (−24)	−17 (−27)	−24 (−31)
Average precipitation inches (mm)	0.55 (14)	0.49 (12)	0.74 (19)	0.60 (15)	0.89 (23)	0.87 (22)	2.26 (57)	2.04 (52)	1.39 (35)	1.34 (34)	0.79 (20)	0.83 (21)	12.79 (325)
Average snowfall inches (cm)	3.7 (9.4)	2.4 (6.1)	3.9 (9.9)	0.4 (1.0)	0.0 (0.0)	0.0 (0.0)	0.0 (0.0)	0.0 (0.0)	0.0 (0.0)	1.3 (3.3)	1.7 (4.3)	6.8 (17)	20.2 (51)
Average precipitation days (≥ 0.01 in)	3.4	3.6	4.3	3.9	4.7	5.0	9.9	10.1	6.1	4.8	3.7	4.3	63.8
Average snowy days (≥ 0.1 in)	1.7	1.2	1.2	0.5	0.0	0.0	0.0	0.0	0.0	0.4	0.6	1.9	7.5
Average relative humidity (%)	67	60	45	36	34	32	45	45	48	47	51	64	48
Mean monthly sunshine hours	220.1	200.6	300.7	342.0	365.8	360.0	362.7	365.8	342.0	232.5	222.0	220.1	3,534.3
Mean daily sunshine hours	7.1	7.1	9.7	11.4	11.8	12	11.7	11.8	11.4	7.5	7.4	7.1	9.7
Mean daily daylight hours	10.1	10.9	12.0	13.1	14.1	14.5	14.3	13.5	12.4	11.3	10.3	9.8	12.2
Percentage possible sunshine	70	65	81	87	84	83	82	87	92	66	72	72	78
Average ultraviolet index	5	8	9	11	12	13	13	12	11	8	5	4	9
Source 1: NOAA
Source 2: Weather Atlas(humidity, sun data), Nomadseason (UV 2022)

== Demographics ==
Historical population
Census	Pop.	Note	%±
1850	4,846		—
1860	4,635		−4.4%
1870	4,756		2.6%
1880	6,635		39.5%
1890	6,185		−6.8%
1900	5,603		−9.4%
1910	5,073		−9.5%
1920	7,326		44.4%
1930	11,176		52.6%
1940	20,325		81.9%
1950	27,998		37.8%
1960	34,394		22.8%
1970	41,167		19.7%
1980	48,053		16.7%
1990	52,303		8.8%
2000	61,109		16.8%
2010	67,947		11.2%
2020	87,505		28.8%
U.S. Decennial Census

=== Racial and ethnic composition ===
Santa Fe, New Mexico – Racial and ethnic composition Note: the US census treats Hispanic/Latino as an ethnic category. This table excludes Latinos from the racial categories and assigns them to a separate category. Hispanics/Latinos may be of any race.
Race / Ethnicity (NH = Non-Hispanic)	Pop. 2000	Pop. 2010	Pop. 2020	%2000	%2010	%2020
White (NH)	29,300	31,412	36,252	47.10%	46.23%	41.43%
Black or African American (NH)	341	530	830	0.55%	0.78%	0.95%
Native American or Alaska Native (NH)	1,019	891	1,287	1.64%	1.31%	1.47%
Asian (NH)	761	927	1,589	1.22%	1.36%	1.82%
Pacific Islander (NH)	36	25	33	0.06%	0.04%	0.04%
Some Other Race (NH)	98	182	554	0.16%	0.27%	0.63%
Mixed race or Multi-Racial (NH)	904	891	2,318	1.45%	1.31%	2.65%
Hispanic or Latino	29,744	33,089	44,642	47.82%	48.70%	51.02%
Total	62,203	67,947	87,505	100.00%	100.00%	100.00%

As of the 2020 census, Santa Fe had a population of 87,505. The city grew by nearly 20,000 residents, or 28.8%, compared to 2010; proportionally, this was the fastest recorded decennial growth rate since 1950. As of July 1, 2025, Santa Fe's estimated population was 89,837, reflecting a growth rate of 2.7% from five years prior, according to the U.S. Census Bureau.

In 2020, the median age was 45.4 years. 17.7% of residents were under the age of 18 and 24.3% of residents were 65 years of age or older. For every 100 females there were 90.5 males, and for every 100 females age 18 and over there were 87.9 males age 18 and over.

The vast majority of resident (98.1%) lived in urban areas, while 1.9% lived in rural areas.

There were 39,683 households in Santa Fe, of which 22.2% had children under the age of 18. Of all households, 34.5% had married couples, 21.5% had a male householder and no spouse or partner present, and 35.8% had a female householder and no spouse or partner present. About 38.8% of all households were made up of individuals and 18.9% had someone living alone who was 65 years of age or older.

There were 44,691 housing units, of which 11.2% were vacant. The homeowner vacancy rate was 1.4% and the rental vacancy rate was 7.1%.

Racial composition as of the 2020 census
Race	Number	Percent
White	48,713	55.7%
Black or African American	978	1.1%
American Indian and Alaska Native	2,133	2.4%
Asian	1,648	1.9%
Native Hawaiian and Other Pacific Islander	63	0.1%
Some other race	14,040	16.0%
Two or more races	19,930	22.8%
Hispanic or Latino (of any race)	44,642	51.0%

According to the 2022 U.S. Census Bureau American Community Survey, the ethnic and racial makeup of the city was 49.4% White, 1.6% Native American, 2.1% Asian, 0.6% African American, 16.9% from other races, and 1.6% from two or more races. Hispanics or Latinos of any race were 50.6% of the population. By comparison, per the 2010 census, the racial makeup of the city was 39.5% White, 2.1% Native American, 1.4% Black, 1.4% Asian, and 3.7% from two or more races; 48.7% of the population were Hispanic or Latino of any race.

Santa Fe has a history of inclusivity, with diverse community organizations. Approximately 23% of households identify as LGBT. As of 2024, foreign-born persons made up over 15% of the population.

== Economy ==
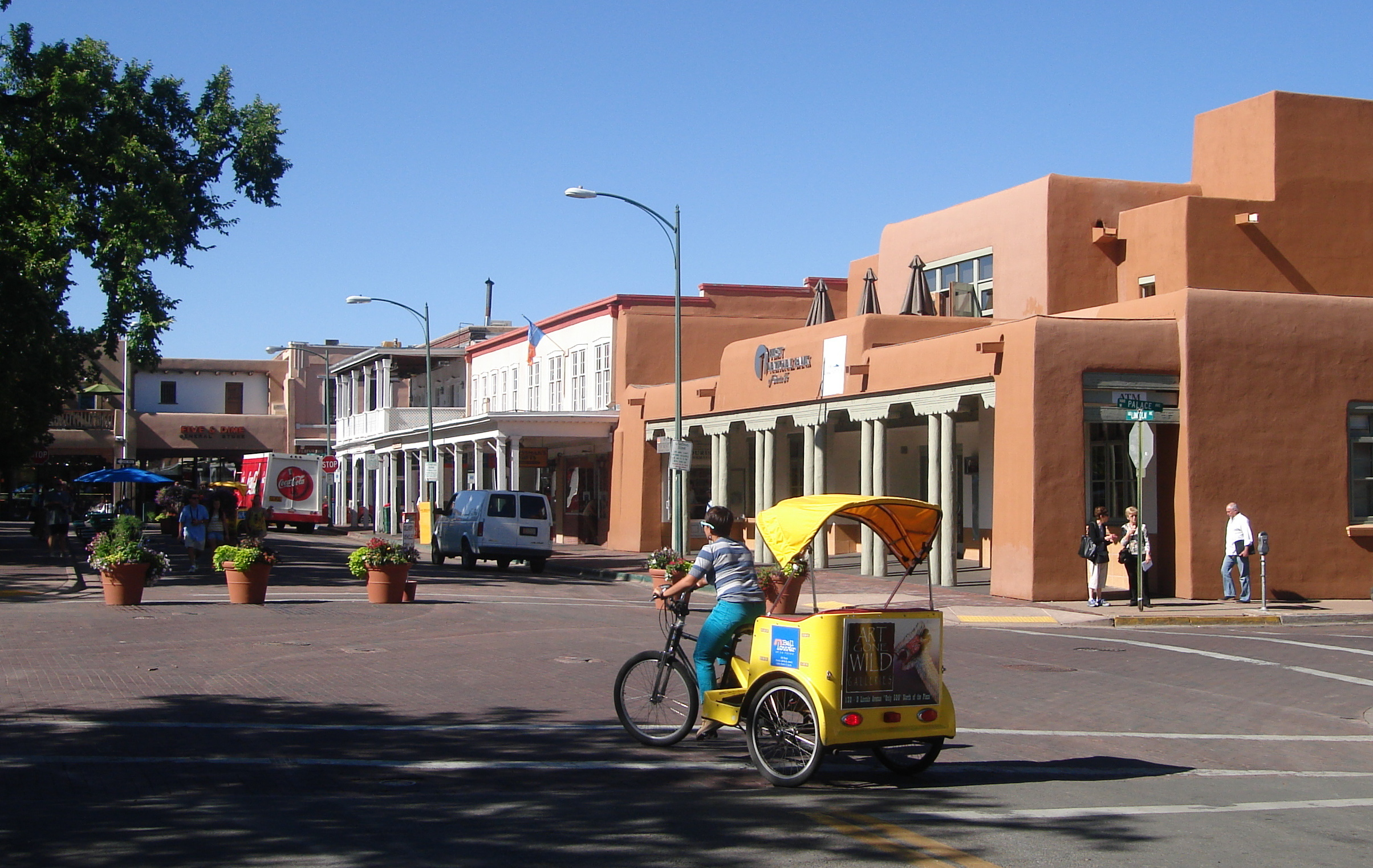
Downtown Santa Fe

Santa Fe has a small but diversified economy led by a strong service sector. As the state capital, the government is the largest employer, accounting for roughly 15,000 jobs, followed by education and health services (11,600) and leisure and hospitality (10,900).

Santa Fe County's GDP in 2022 was $8.8 billion, of which services comprised roughly two-thirds (74.2%), followed by government (20.8%) and manufacturing (5%).

=== Tourism ===
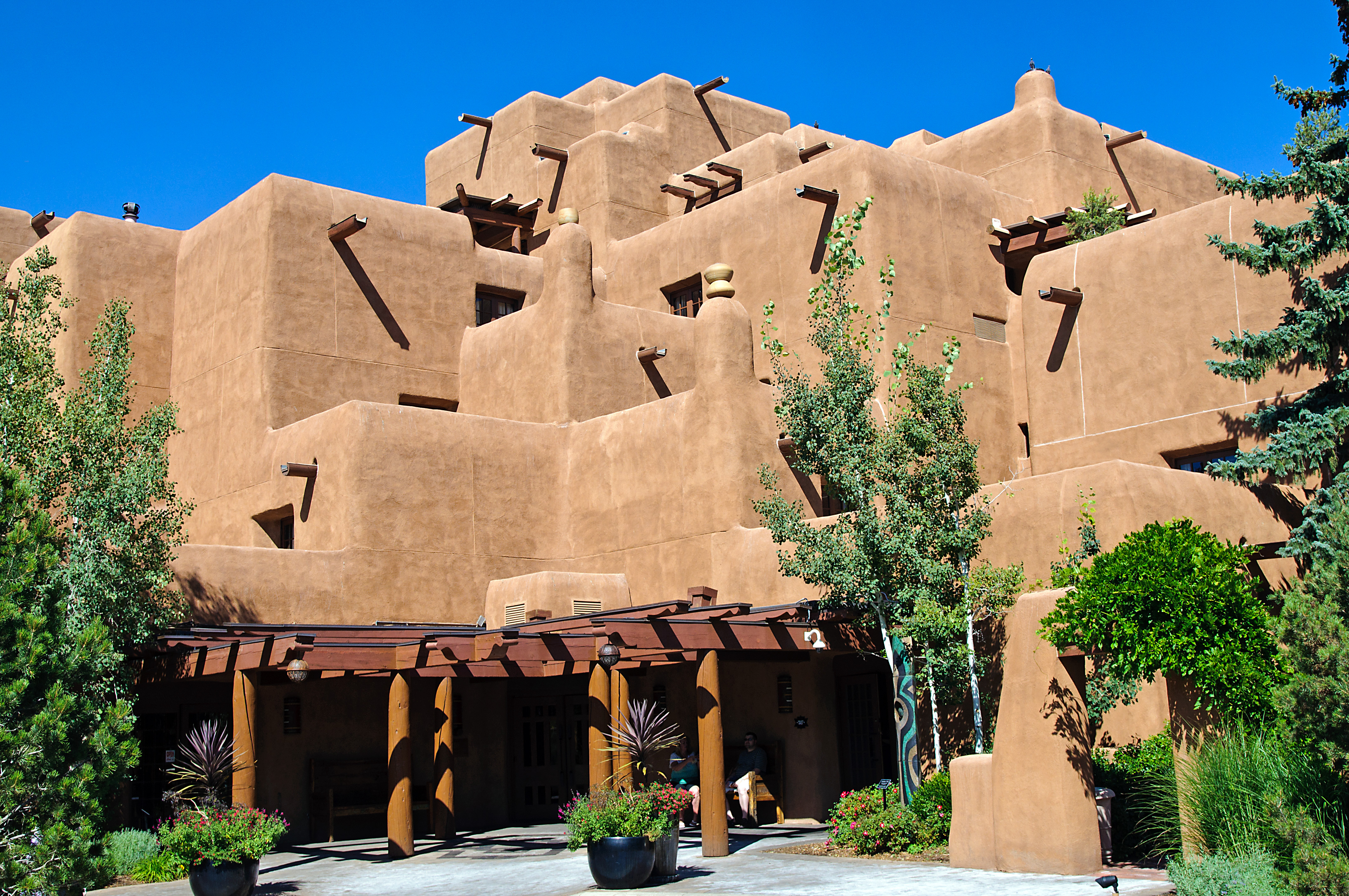
The Inn & Spa at Loretto

Tourism is a major element of the Santa Fe economy, with visitors attracted year-round by the climate and related outdoor activities (such as skiing in years of adequate snowfall; hiking in other seasons) plus cultural activities of the city and the region. Tourism information is provided by the convention and visitor bureau and the chamber of commerce.

Some tourist activities take place in the historic downtown, especially on and around the Plaza, a one-block square adjacent to the Palace of the Governors, the original seat of New Mexico's territorial government since the time of Spanish colonization. Other areas include "Museum Hill", the site of several art museums as well as the annual Santa Fe International Folk Art Market. There are numerous art and craft galleries along Canyon Road. During the second week of September, the aspens in the Sangre de Cristo Mountains turn yellow. This is also the time of the annual Fiestas de Santa Fe, celebrating the "reconquering" of Santa Fe by Don Diego de Vargas, a highlight of which is the burning Zozobra ("Old Man Gloom"), a 50-foot (15 m) marionette.

Day trips in the Santa Fe area include locations such as the town of Taos, about 70 mi (113 km) north of Santa Fe. The historic Bandelier National Monument and the Valles Caldera are located approximately 30 mi (48 km) away. Santa Fe's ski resort, Ski Santa Fe, is about sixteen mi (26 km) northeast of the city. Chimayo is also nearby and many locals complete the annual pilgrimage to the Santuario de Chimayo.

=== Science and technology ===
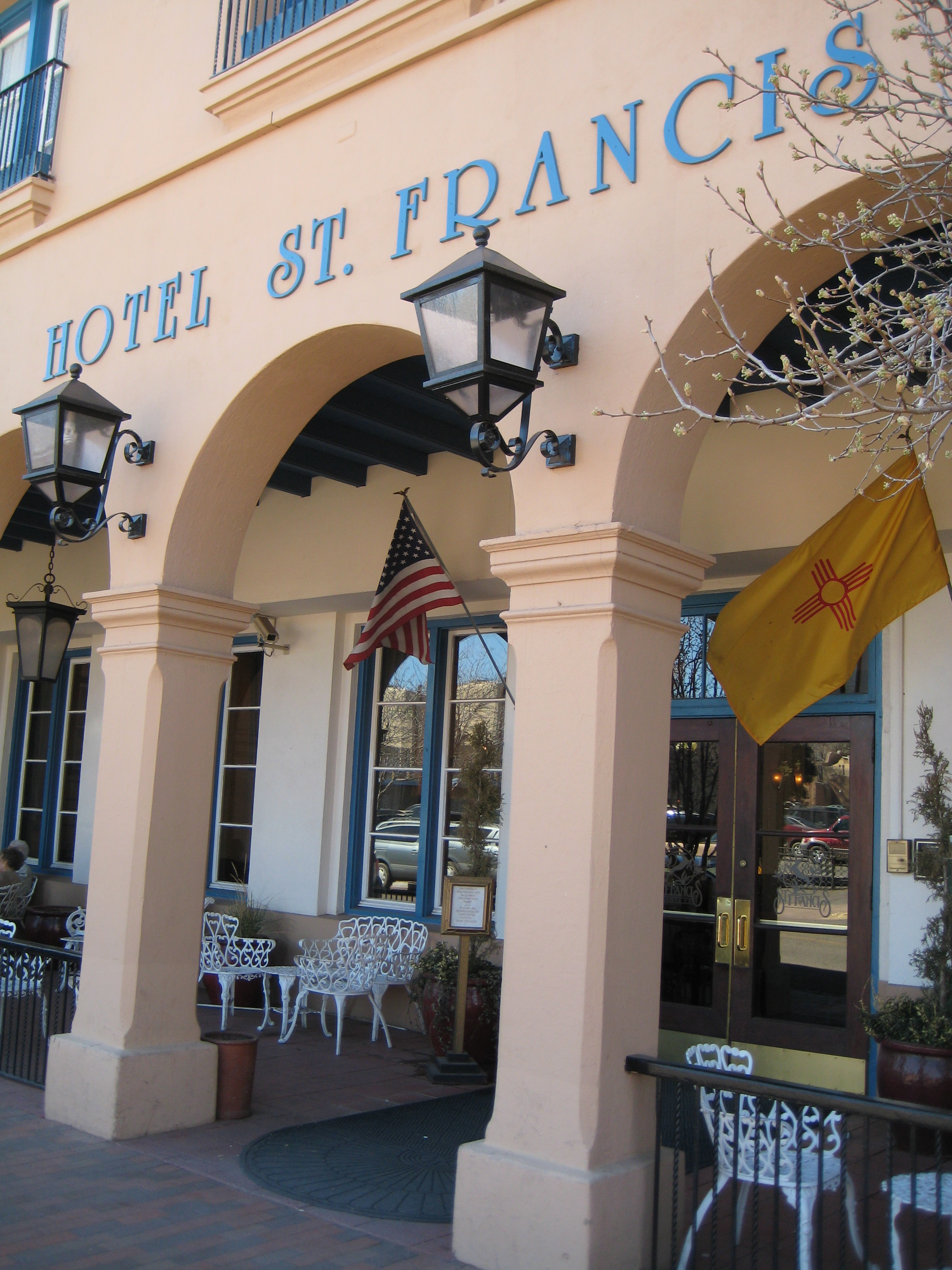
Hotel St. Francis

Santa Fe has been associated with science and technology since 1943, when it served as the gateway to Los Alamos National Laboratory (LANL), a 45-minute drive from the city. In 1984, the Santa Fe Institute (SFI) was founded to research complex systems in the physical, biological, economic, and political sciences; it has hosted Nobel laureates such as Murray Gell-Mann (physics), Philip Warren Anderson (physics), and Kenneth Arrow (economics). The National Center for Genome Resources (NCGR) was founded in 1994 to focus on research at the intersection of bioscience, computing, and mathematics. Sandia National Laboratories (SNL), one of three research and development laboratories of the U.S. Department of Energy's National Nuclear Security Administration (NNSA), is based in Albuquerque, roughly an hour from Santa Fe.

Due to the presence and proximity of various educational and scientific institutions, its overall attractiveness for visitors, and an established tourism industry, Santa Fe routinely hosts a variety of scientific meetings, summer schools, and public lectures, such as International q-bio Conference on Cellular Information Processing, Santa Fe Institute's Complex Systems Summer School, and LANL's Center for Nonlinear Studies Annual Conference. Since the 1990s, several technology companies have formed or established operations in the city to commercialize technologies emerging from these institutions.

In 2020, Santa Fe announced efforts to become the "Silicon Valley of the Southwest" through partnerships with various educational, scientific, and business organizations aimed at creating a "technology ecosystem". The city is part of New Mexico's broader statewide initiative to become a science and technology hub, sometimes called "Silicon Mesa", as well as the New Mexico Innovation Triangle (NMIT), an ongoing initiative launched in 2020 that includes Los Alamos and Albuquerque as part of a purported innovation ecosystem.

== Arts and culture ==
Santa Fe is well known as a center for arts and for its multiculturalism; since 2005, it has been designated as a UNESCO Creative City in Crafts and Folk Art.

=== Architecture ===
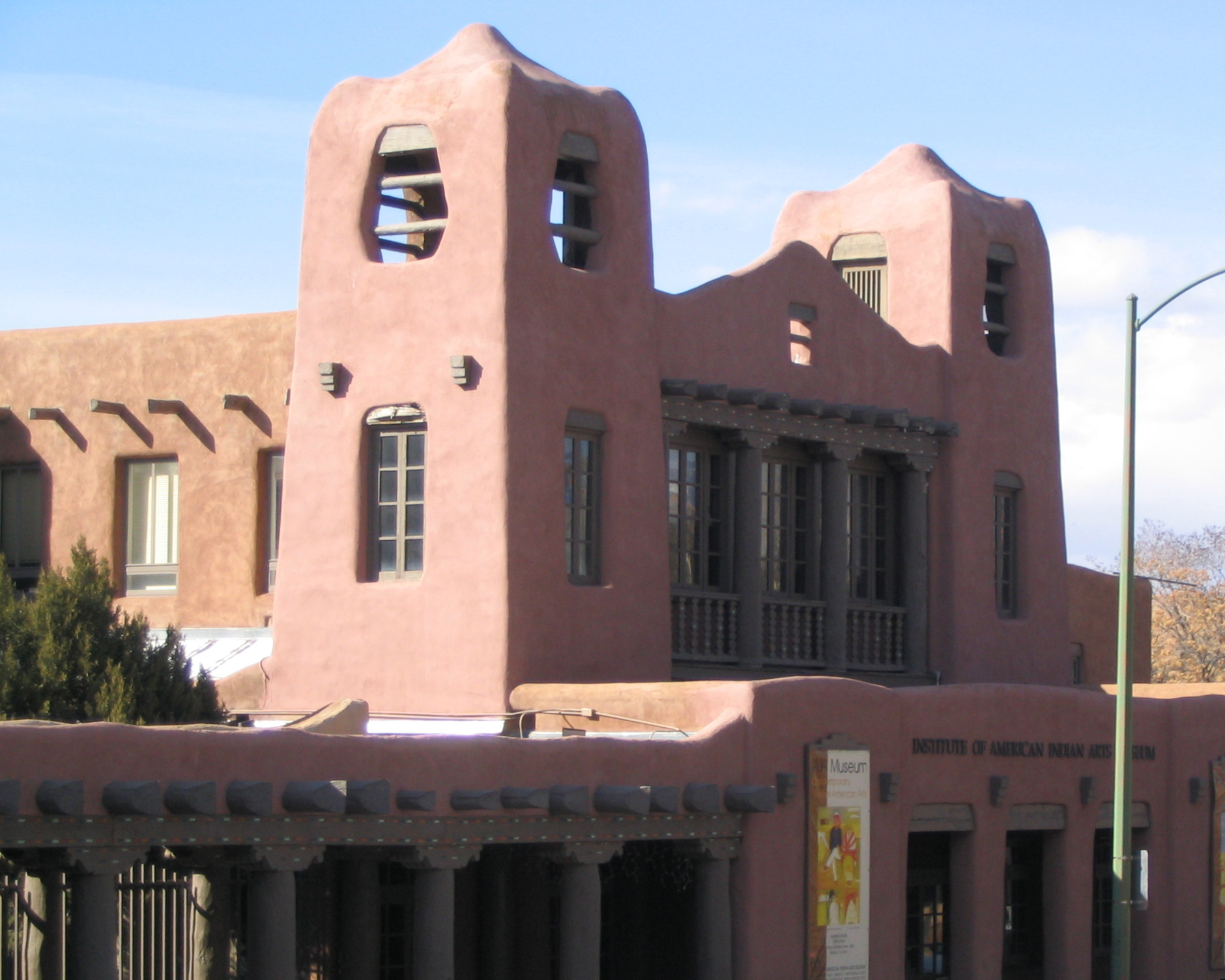
Institute of American Indian Arts

The Spanish laid out the city according to the "Laws of the Indies", town planning rules and ordinances which had been established in 1573 by King Philip II. The fundamental principle was that the town be laid out around a central plaza. On its north side was the Palace of the Governors, while on the east was the church that later became the Cathedral Basilica of Saint Francis of Assisi.

An important style implemented in planning the city was the radiating grid of streets centered on the central Plaza. Many were narrow and included small alleyways, but each gradually merged into the more casual byways of the agricultural perimeter areas. As the city grew throughout the 19th century, the building styles evolved too, so that by statehood in 1912, the eclectic nature of the buildings caused it to look like "Anywhere USA". The city government realized that the economic decline, which had started more than twenty years before with the railway moving west and the federal government closing down Fort Marcy, might be reversed by the promotion of tourism.

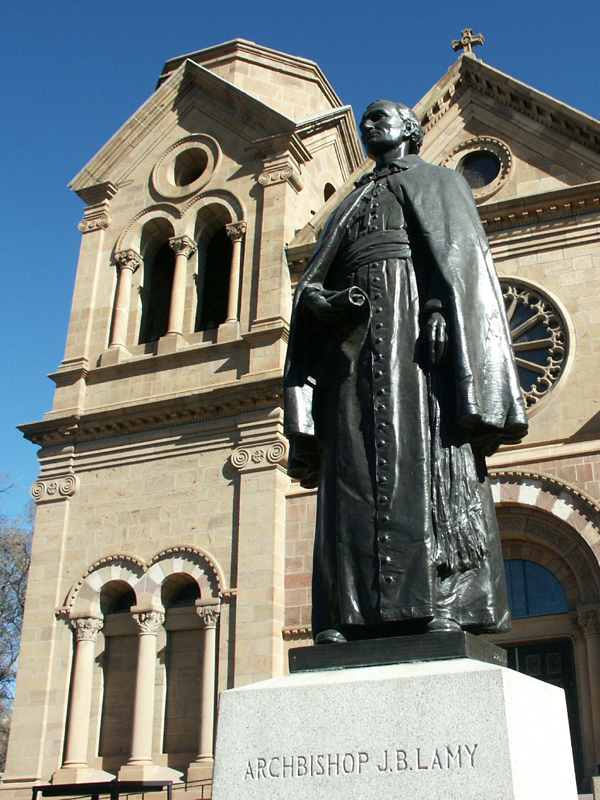
The Cathedral Basilica of Saint Francis of Assisi

To achieve that goal, the city created the idea of imposing a unified building style – the Santa Fe Pueblo Revival look, which was based on work done restoring the Palace of the Governors. The sources for this style came from the many defining features of local architecture: vigas (rough, exposed beams that extrude through supporting walls, and are thus visible outside as well as inside the building) and canales (rain spouts cut into short parapet walls around flat roofs), features borrowed from many old adobe homes and churches built many years before and found in the pueblos, along with the earth-toned look (reproduced in stucco) of the old adobe exteriors.

After 1912 this style became official: all buildings were to be built using these elements. By 1930 there was a broadening to include the "Territorial", a style of the pre-statehood period which included the addition of portales (large, covered porches) and white-painted window and door pediments (and also sometimes terra cotta tiles on sloped roofs, but with flat roofs still dominating). The city had become "different". However, "in the rush to pueblofy" Santa Fe, the city lost a great deal of its architectural history and eclecticism. Among the architects most closely associated with this new style are T. Charles Gaastra and John Gaw Meem.

By an ordinance passed in 1957, new and rebuilt buildings, especially those in designated historic districts, must exhibit a Spanish Territorial or Pueblo style of architecture, with flat roofs and other features suggestive of the area's traditional adobe construction. However, many contemporary houses in the city are built from lumber, concrete blocks, and other common building materials, but with stucco surfaces (sometimes referred to as "faux-dobe", pronounced as one word: "foe-dough-bee") reflecting the historic style.

=== Visual arts ===
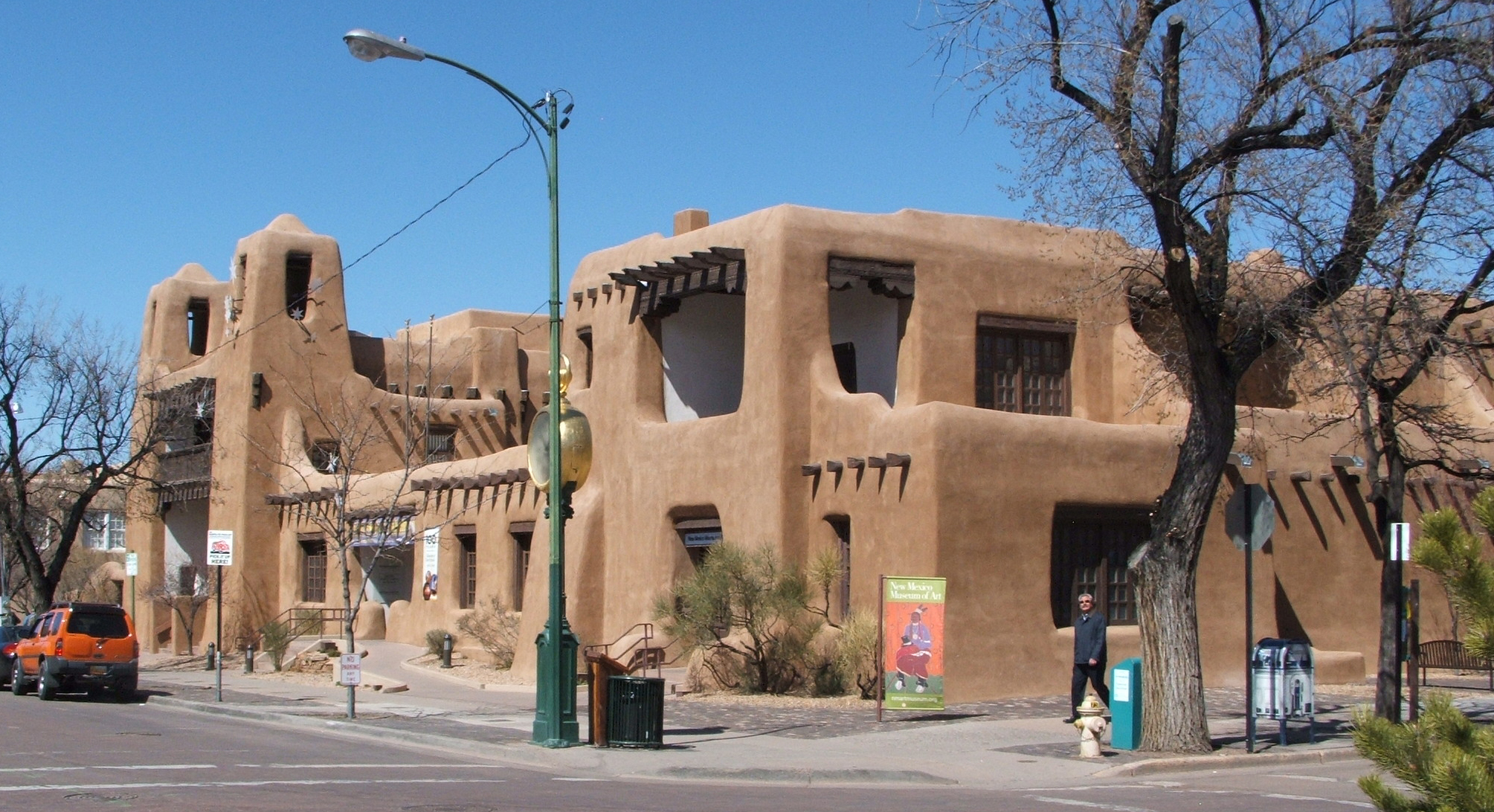
New Mexico Museum of Art

Canyon Road, east of the Plaza, has the highest concentration of art galleries in the city, and is a destination for international collectors, tourists and locals. The Canyon Road galleries showcase an array of contemporary, Southwestern, Indigenous American, and experimental art, in addition Taos Masters, and Native American pieces. There are several outdoor sculptures in the city, including many statues of Francis of Assisi, and several other holy figures, such as Kateri Tekakwitha.

SITE Santa Fe exhibits new developments in contemporary art, encouraging artistic exploration, and expanding traditional museum experiences. Launched in 1995 SITE organizes an international biennial of contemporary art in the United States, similar to exhibitions as the Whitney Biennial and the Venice Biennale but at a smaller scale.

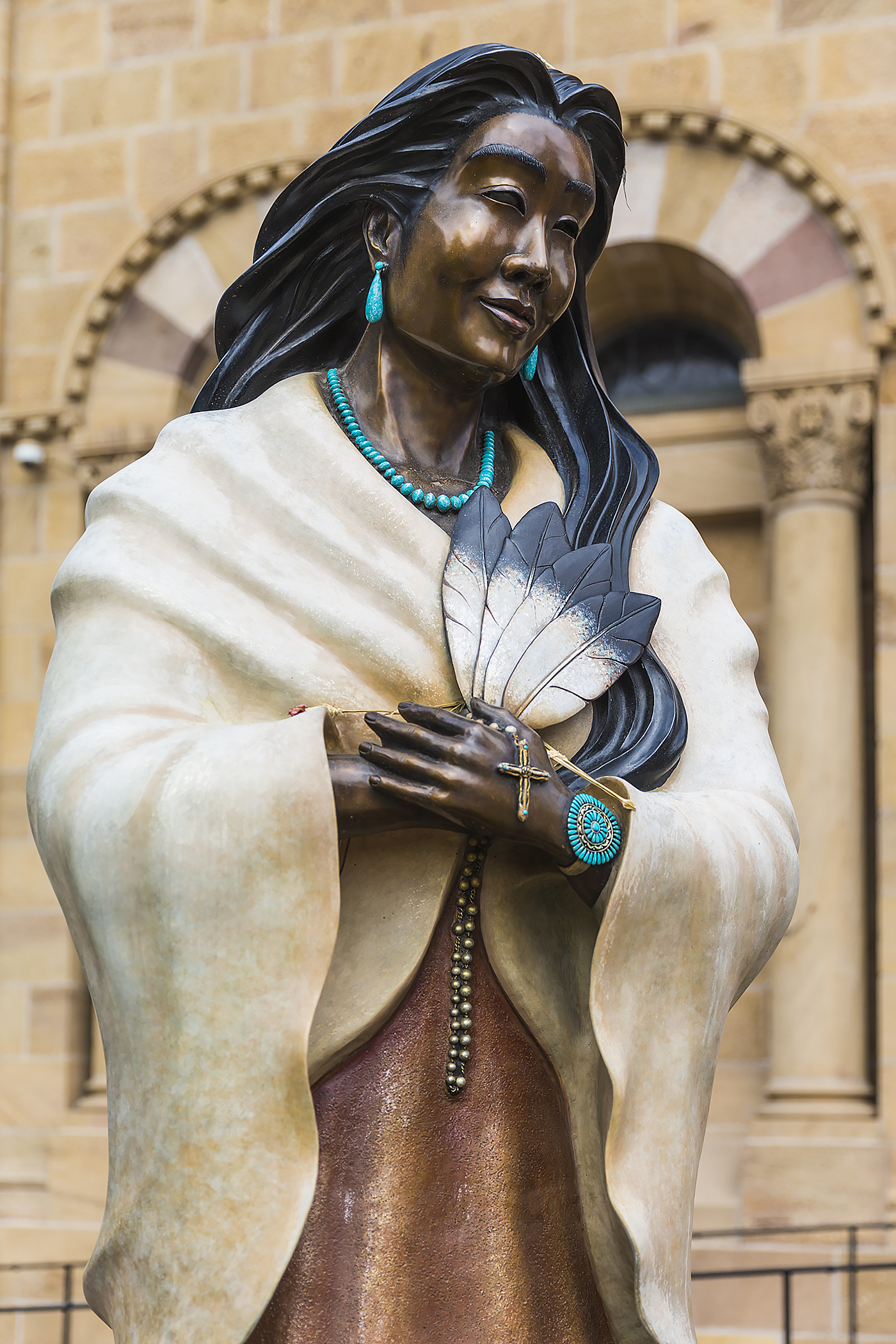
Statue of St. Kateri Tekakwitha

Santa Fe contains a lively contemporary art scene, with Meow Wolf as its main art collective. Originally backed by author George R. R. Martin, Meow Wolf opened an elaborate art installation space, called House of Eternal Return, in 2016.

=== Literature ===
Numerous authors followed the influx of visual artists. Well-known writers who currently or previously lived in the city include D. H. Lawrence, Cormac McCarthy, Arkady Martine, Vivian Shaw, Michael Tobias, Kate Braverman, Douglas Adams, Tony Hillerman, Roger Zelazny, Alice Corbin Henderson, Mary Austin, Witter Bynner, Dan Flores, Paul Horgan, Rudolfo Anaya, George R. R. Martin, Mitch Cullin, David Morrell, Evan S. Connell, Richard Bradford, John Masters, Jack Schaefer, Hampton Sides, Ariel Gore, Daniela Naomi Molnar, and Michael McGarrity. Novelist Walker Percy lived on a dude ranch outside Santa Fe before returning to Louisiana to begin his literary career.

=== Music, dance, and opera ===
Performance Santa Fe, formerly the Santa Fe Concert Association, is the oldest presenting organization in Santa Fe. Founded in 1937, Performance Santa Fe brings celebrated and legendary musicians as well as some of the world's greatest dancers and actors to the city year-round. The Santa Fe Opera stages its productions between late June and late August each year. The city also hosts the Santa Fe Chamber Music Festival which is held at about the same time, mostly in the St. Francis Auditorium and in the Lensic Theater. In July and August, the Santa Fe Desert Chorale holds its summer festival. Santa Fe has its own professional ballet company, Aspen Santa Fe Ballet, which performs in both cities and tours nationally and internationally. Santa Fe is also home to internationally acclaimed Flamenco dancer's María Benítez Institute for Spanish Arts which offers programs and performance in Flamenco, Spanish Guitar and similar arts year-round.

=== Fashion ===
Santa Fe has become a growing hub for Indigenous and contemporary fashion. Each May, the city hosts Native Fashion Week, an annual series of events celebrating Indigenous designers, artists, and models from across North America. In August, during the Santa Fe Indian Market, the SWAIA Indigenous Fashion Show draws national attention for its high-profile runway presentations of Native couture. Additionally, Santa Fe Fashion Week, held annually in the fall, features regional designers and emerging talent, contributing to the city's expanding presence in the fashion industry.

=== Landmarks ===
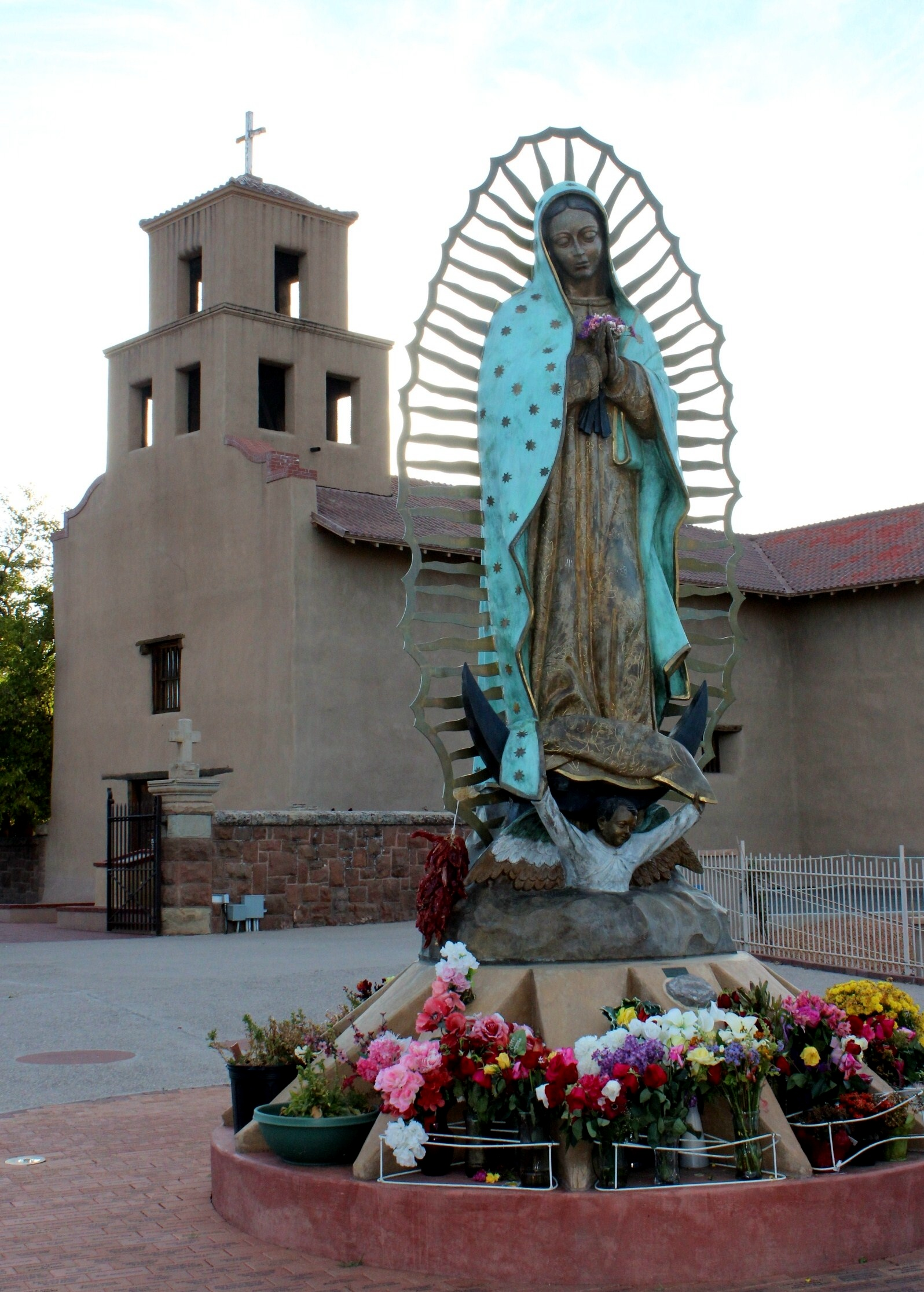
Santuario de Guadalupe is the oldest church in the country dedicated to the Virgin of Guadalupe.

- New Mexico State Capitol
- Cathedral Basilica of Saint Francis of Assisi
- Loretto Chapel
- Palace of the Governors
- San Miguel Mission and the rest of the Barrio De Analco Historic District
- Santuario de Guadalupe
- De Vargas Street House
- New Mexico Governor's Mansion
- La Cieneguilla Petroglyphs
- Barrio De Analco Historic District
- Don Gaspar Historic District
- Santa Fe Historic District
- Santa Fe Railyard arts district

=== Museums ===
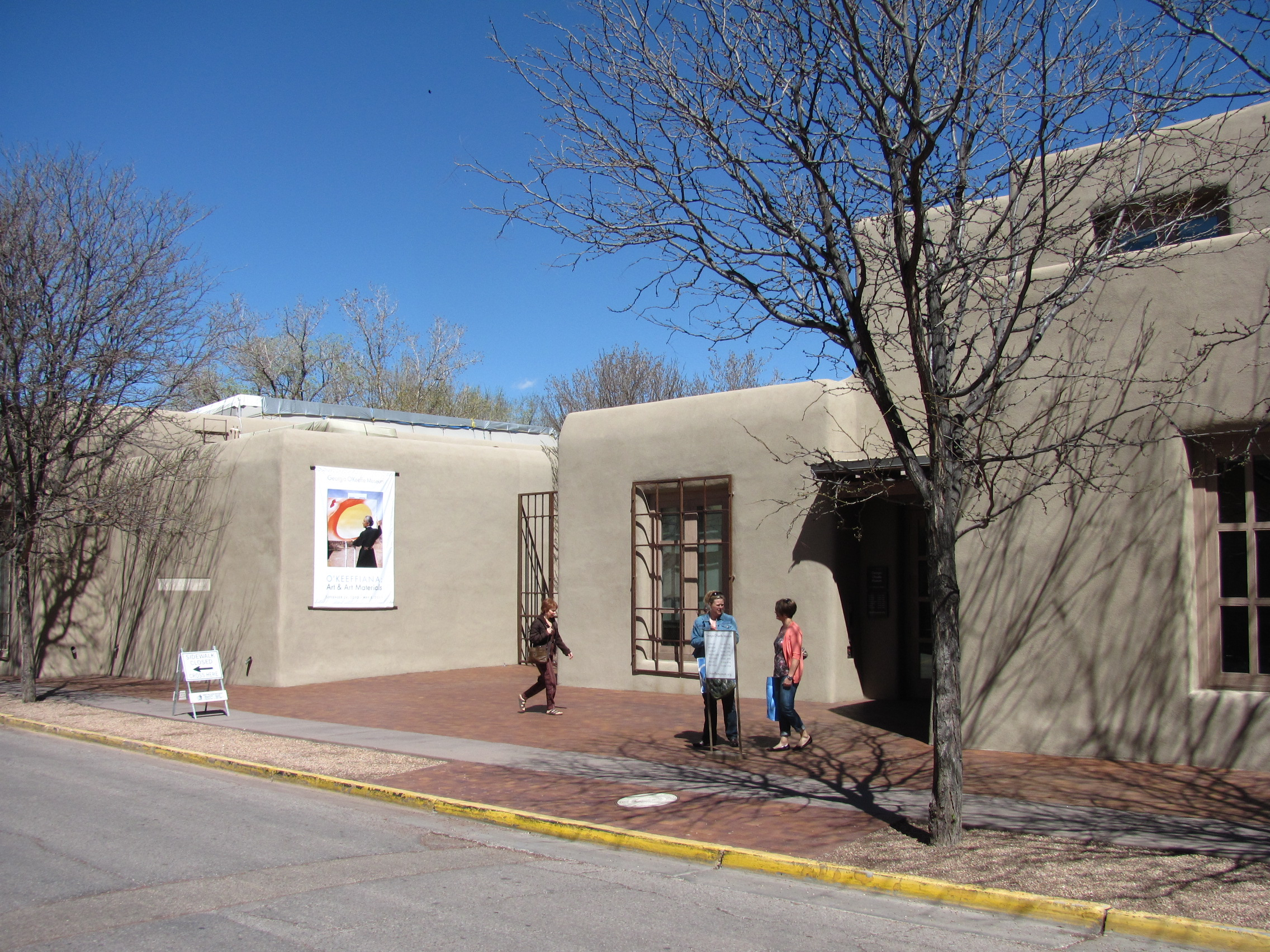
Georgia O'Keeffe Museum

Santa Fe has many museums located near the downtown Plaza:

- New Mexico Museum of Art – collections of modern and contemporary Southwestern art
- Museum of Contemporary Native Arts – contemporary Native American arts with political aspects
- Georgia O'Keeffe Museum – devoted to the work of O'Keeffe and others whom she influenced
- New Mexico History Museum – located behind the Palace of the Governors
- Site Santa Fe – a contemporary art space

Several other museums are located in the area known as Museum Hill:

- Museum of International Folk Art – folk art from around the world
- Museum of Indian Arts and Culture – Native American arts
- Wheelwright Museum of the American Indian – Native American art and history
- Museum of Spanish Colonial Art – Tradition arts from the Spanish-colonial era to contemporary times.

=== Restaurants ===
- Alkemē
- Bobcat Bite

== Sports ==
The New Mexico Style were an American Basketball Association franchise founded in 2005, but reformed in Texas for the 2007–08 season as the El Paso S'ol (which folded without playing an ABA game in their new city). The Santa Fe Roadrunners were a North American Hockey League team, but moved to Kansas to become the Topeka Roadrunners. Santa Fe's rodeo, the Rodeo De Santa Fe, is held annually during the last week of June. In May 2012, Santa Fe became the home of the Santa Fe Fuego of the Pecos League of Professional Baseball Clubs. They play their home games at Fort Marcy Ballfield. Horse racing events were held at The Downs at Santa Fe from 1971 until 1997.

== Government ==
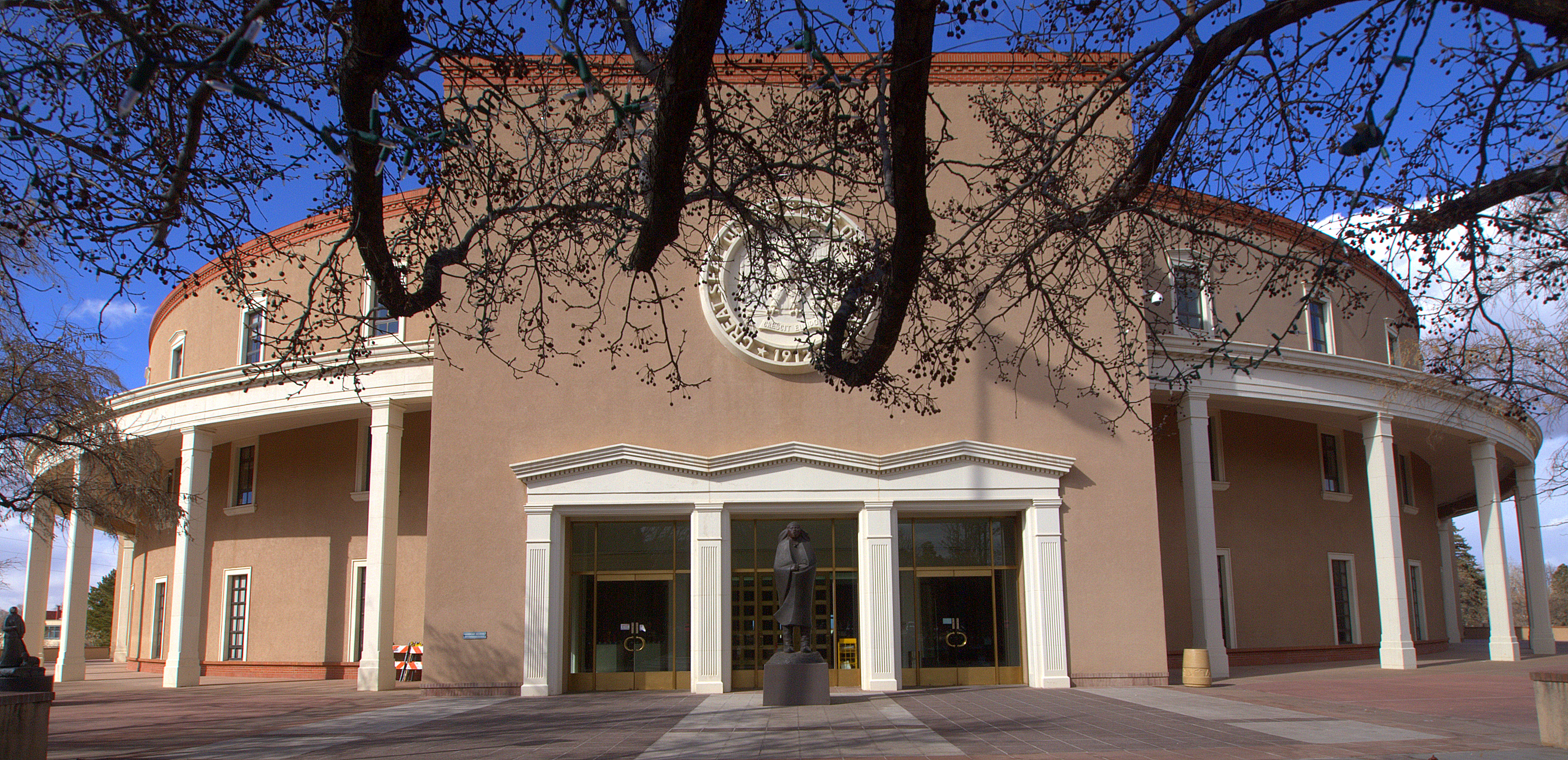
The New Mexico State Capitol, commonly known as The Roundhouse, was built in a Territorial Revival style.

Santa Fe is a charter city governed by a mayor-council system. The city is divided into four electoral districts, each represented by two councilors. Councilors are elected to staggered four-year terms and one councilor from each district is elected every two years. The current mayor of Santa Fe is Michael Garcia, who succeeded Alan Webber in January 2026; current city council members are Alma Castro, Signe I. Lindell, Michael Garcia, Carol Romero-Wirth, Pilar Faulkner, Lee Garcia, Jamie Cassutt, and Amanda Chávez.

The municipal judgeship is an elected position and a requirement of the holder is that they be a member of the state bar. The judge is elected to four-year terms.

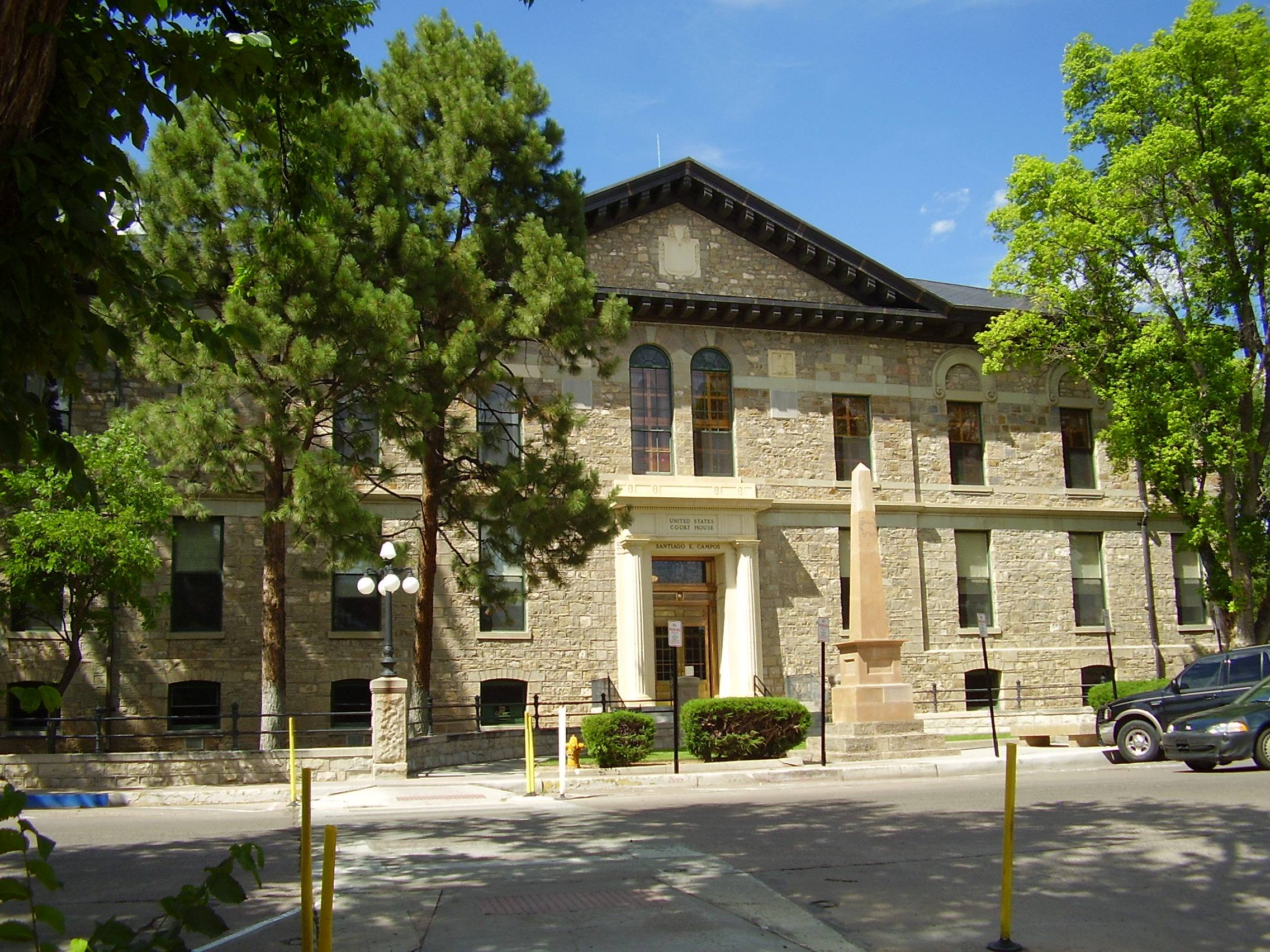
Santiago Campos U.S. Courthouse

The mayor is the chief executive officer of Santa Fe and a member of the governing body. The mayor has numerous powers and duties, and while previously the mayor could only vote when there was a tie among the city council, the city charter was amended by referendum in 2014 to allow the mayor to vote on all matters in front of the council. Since 2018, the role of mayor has been full-time professional paid position within city government. Day-to-day operations of the municipality are undertaken by the city manager's office.

On July 30, 2026, the Santa Fe City Council and Santa Fe County Board of County Commissioners held their first Joint Governing Body Meeting under a new joint resolution that called for regular collaboration through 2029 focused on making improvements for residents throughout the region. The meeting explored partnerships to address affordable housing and homeless programs, city boundary and regional planning and the demand for more senior services.

=== Federal ===
The Joseph M. Montoya Federal Building and Post Office serves as an office for U.S. federal government operations. It also contains the primary United States Postal Service post office in the city. Other post offices in the Santa Fe city limits include Coronado, De Vargas Mall, and Santa Fe Place Mall. The U.S. Courthouse building, constructed in 1889, was added to the National Register of Historic Places in 1973.

=== Politics ===
Adelina Otero-Warren, a leading suffragist in New Mexico, became one of the state's first female government officials when she served as superintendent of Santa Fe public schools from 1917 to 1929. In 1922, she also became the first Hispanic woman to run for the U.S. Congress, as the Republican nominee to represent New Mexico's at-large district. In 2022, Otero-Warren was one of five women chosen for the American Women Quarters Program, which honors women who have made notable contributions to the country.

Santa Fe has long been one of the strongest Democratic bastions in the state of New Mexico. In 2024, Kamala Harris earned 78.1% of the city's vote, while the Republican candidate Donald Trump received 19.5%.

== Education ==
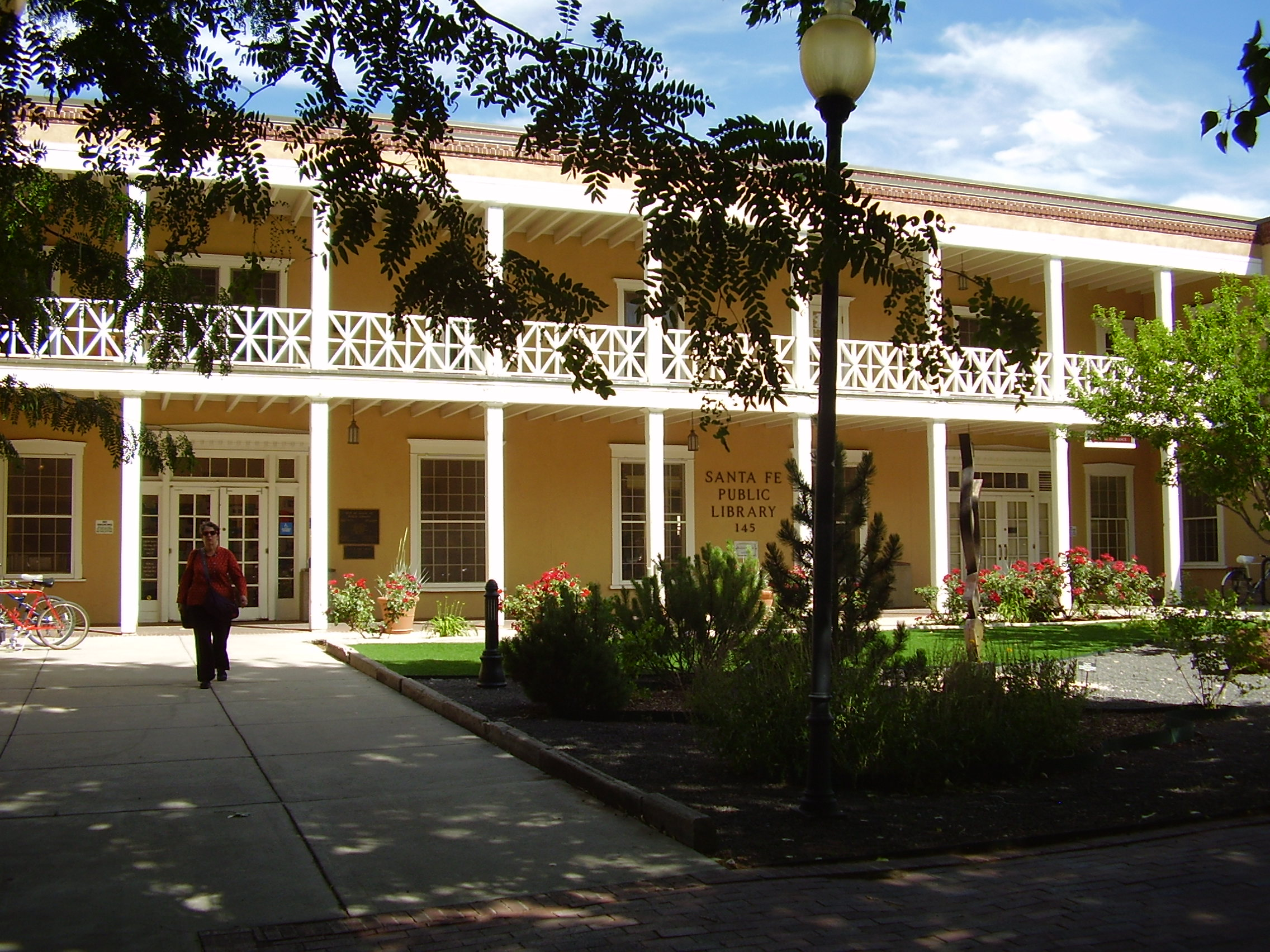
Santa Fe Public Library

Public schools in Santa Fe are operated by Santa Fe Public Schools, with the exception of the New Mexico School for the Arts, which is a public/private partnership comprising the NMSA-Art Institute, a nonprofit art educational institution, and NMSA-Charter School, an accredited New Mexico state charter high school.

Santa Fe has four public high schools:

- Santa Fe High School (1,500 students)
- Capital High School (1,300 students)
- New Mexico School for the Arts (200 students)
- Mandela International Magnet School (300 students)

The city's institutions of higher education include St. John's College, a liberal arts college; the Institute of American Indian Arts, a tribal college for Native American arts; Southwestern College, a graduate school for counseling and art therapy; and Santa Fe Community College.

The city has four private college preparatory high schools: St. Michael's High School, New Mexico School for the Deaf, Santa Fe Secondary School, and Santa Fe Preparatory School. The Academy for Technology and the Classics is the one charter school. The Santa Fe Indian School is an off-reservation school for Native Americans. Santa Fe is also the location of the New Mexico School for the Arts, a public-private partnership, arts-focused high school. The city has many private elementary schools as well, including Little Earth School, Santa Fe International Elementary School, Rio Grande School, Desert Montessori School, La Mariposa Montessori, The Tara School, Fayette Street Academy, The Santa Fe Girls' School, The Academy for the Love of Learning, and Santa Fe School for the Arts and Sciences.

== Media ==
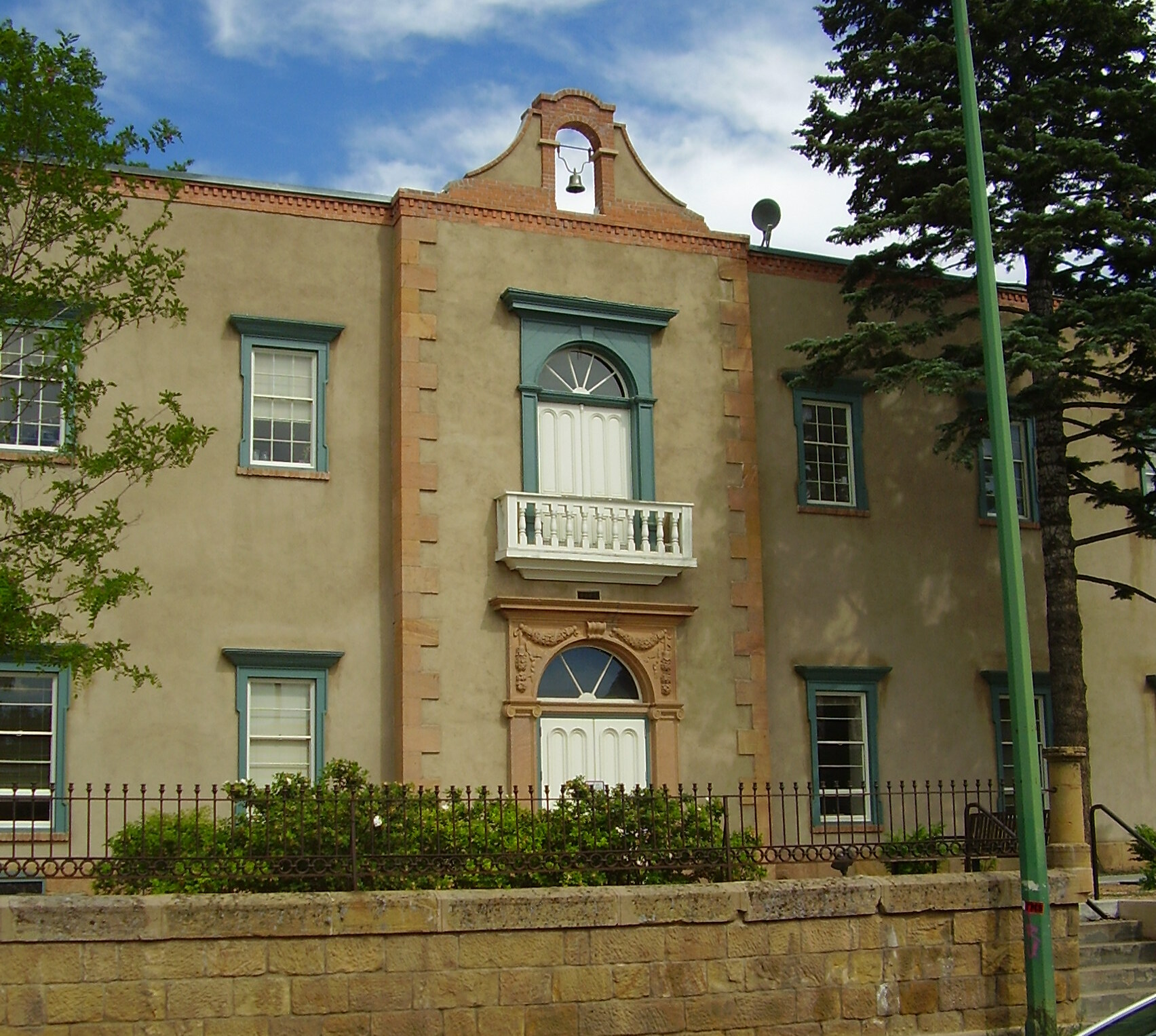
The Lamy Building, built in 1878

Santa Fe's daily newspaper is the Santa Fe New Mexican, and each week it publishes Pasatiempo, its long-running magazine providing commentary on arts, events, and entertainment. Other publications in the city include Santa Fe Reporter, New Mexico Magazine, and Green Fire Times. KSFR is a local variety radio station that owned by Santa Fe Community College and broadcasts on 101.1 FM.

== Transportation ==
=== Air ===
Santa Fe is served by the Santa Fe Regional Airport. American Airlines provides regional jet service to Dallas/Fort Worth International Airport and Phoenix Sky Harbor International Airport. United Airlines has regional jet service to Denver International Airport and Houston Intercontinental Airport seasonally. Additionally, JSX (airline) offers service to Dallas Love Field.

=== Road ===
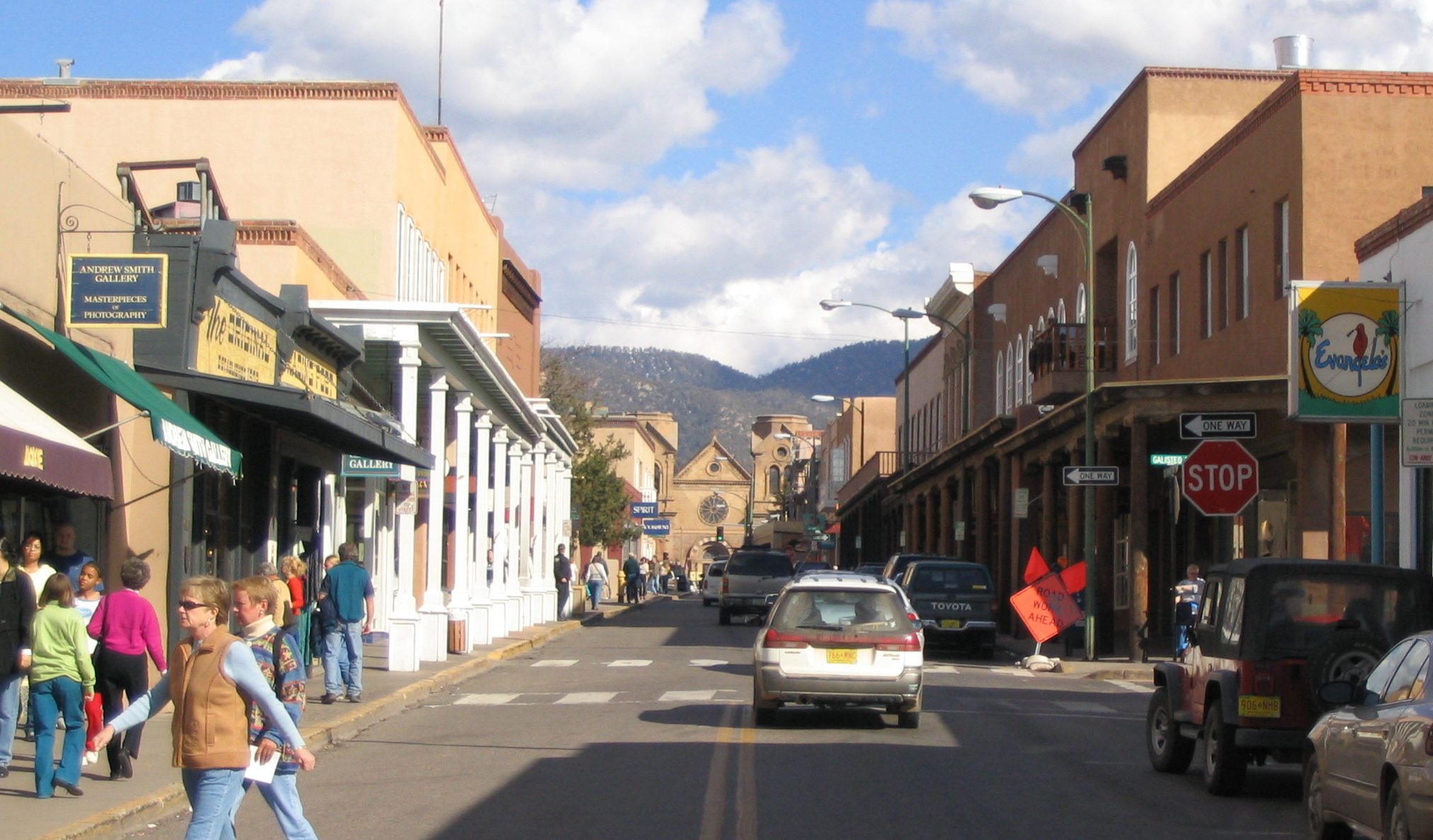
Downtown Santa Fe

Santa Fe is located on I-25. In addition, U.S. Route 84 (US 84) and US 285 pass through the city, along St. Francis Drive. NM-599 forms a limited-access road bypass around the northwestern part of the city.

In its earliest alignment (1926–1937), US 66 ran through Santa Fe.

=== Public transit ===
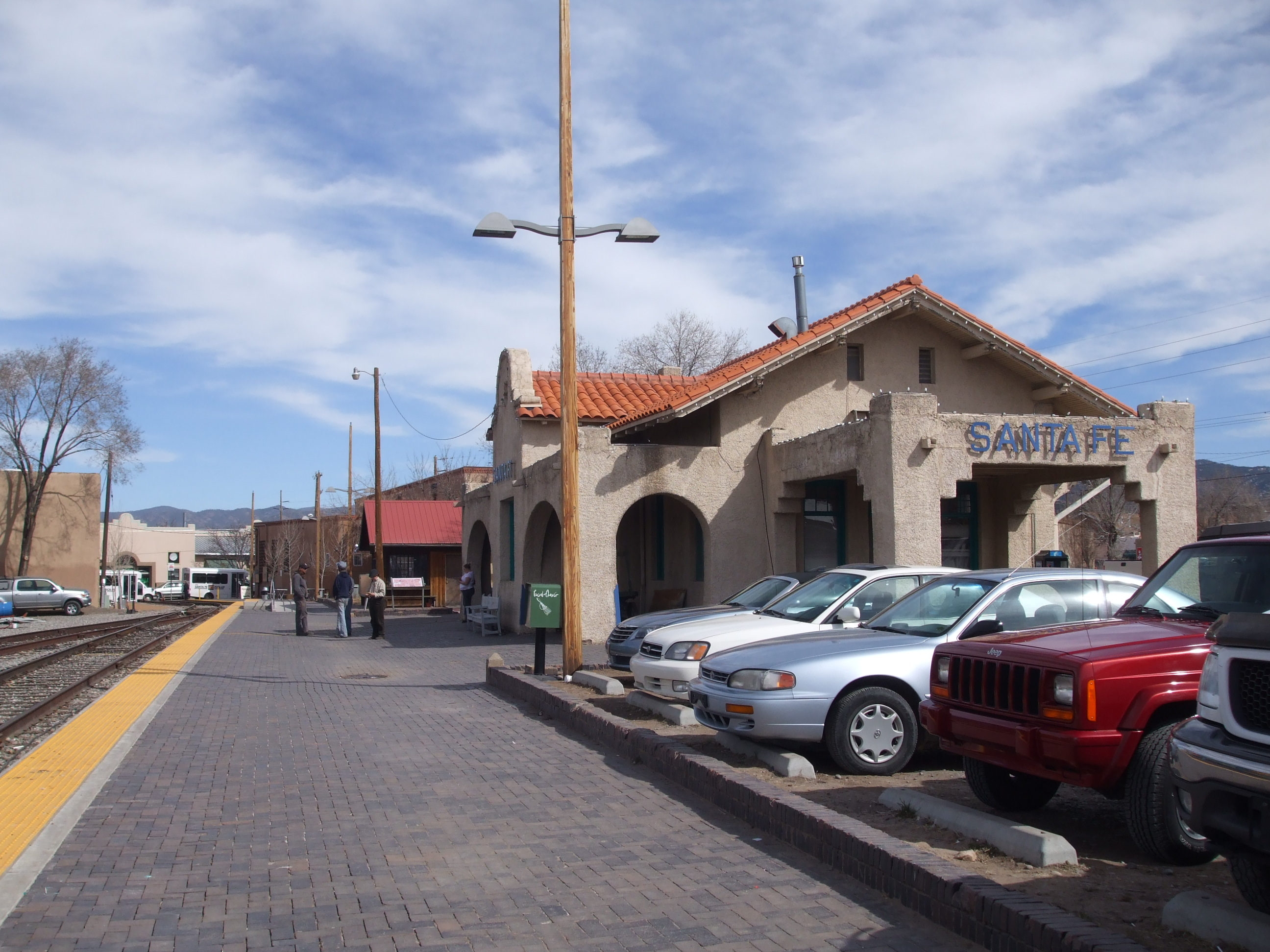
Santa Fe Depot is served by the New Mexico Rail Runner Express.

Santa Fe Trails, run by the city, operates a number of bus routes within the city during business hours and also provides connections to regional transit.

The New Mexico Rail Runner Express is a commuter rail service operating in Valencia, Bernalillo (including Albuquerque), Sandoval, and Santa Fe Counties. In Santa Fe County, the service uses 18 miles (29 km) of new right-of-way connecting the BNSF Railway's old transcontinental mainline to existing right-of-way in Santa Fe used by the Santa Fe Southern Railway. Santa Fe is currently served by four stations, Santa Fe Depot, South Capitol, Zia Road, and Santa Fe County/NM 599.

New Mexico Park and Ride, a division of the New Mexico Department of Transportation, and the North Central Regional Transit District operate primarily weekday commuter coach/bus service to Santa Fe from Torrance, Rio Arriba, Taos, San Miguel and Los Alamos Counties in addition to shuttle services within Santa Fe connecting major government activity centers. Prior to the Rail Runner's extension to Santa Fe, Park and Ride operated commuter coach service between Albuquerque and Santa Fe.

Groome Transportation provides shuttles between Santa Fe and the Albuquerque International Sunport.

=== Rail ===
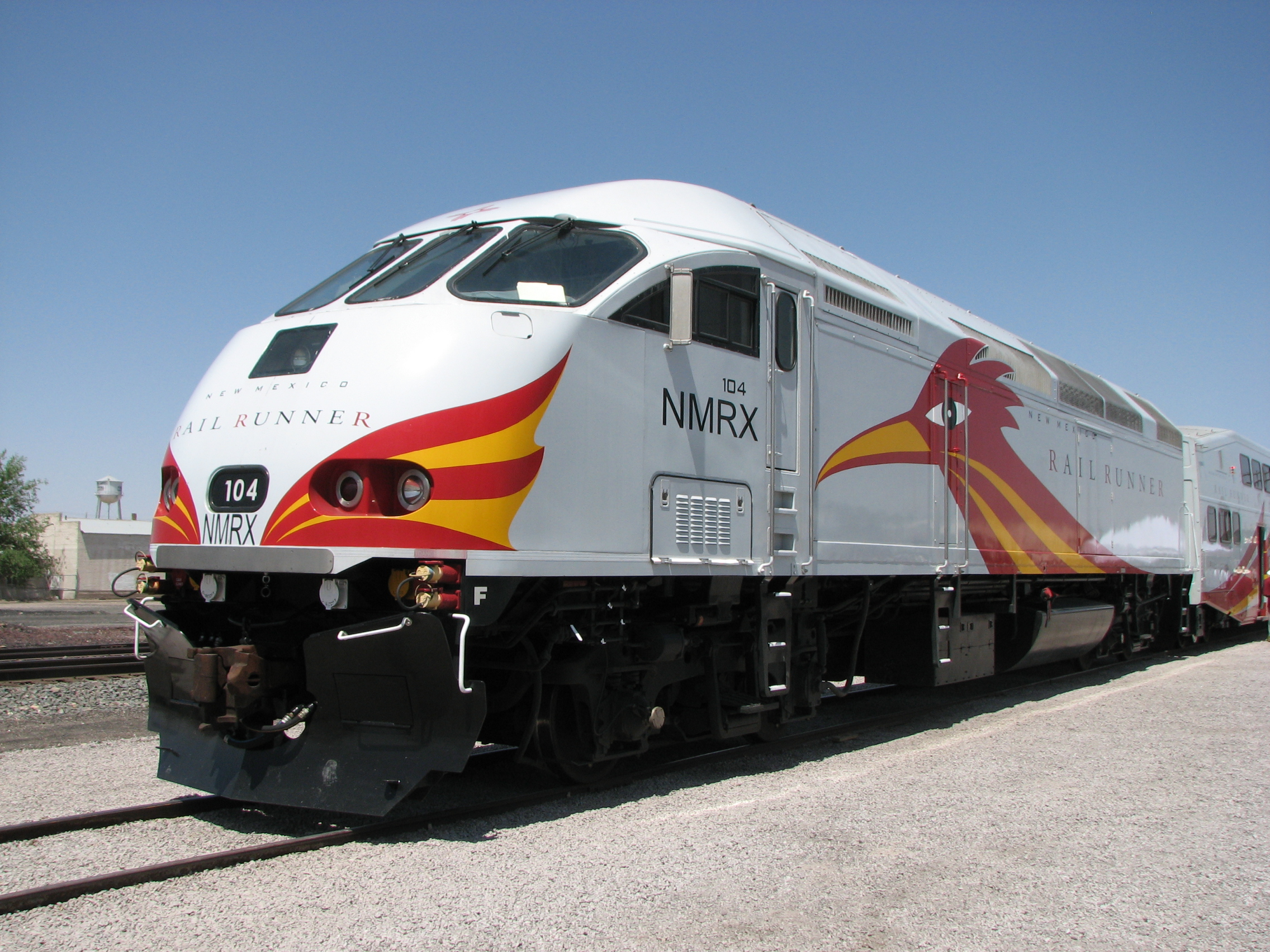
The New Mexico Rail Runner Express connects Santa Fe to the Albuquerque area.

Along with the New Mexico Rail Runner Express, a commuter rail line serving the metropolitan areas of Albuquerque and Santa Fe, the city or its environs are served by two other railroads. The Santa Fe Southern Railway, now mostly a tourist rail experience but also carrying freight, operates excursion services out of Santa Fe as far as Lamy, 15 miles (24 km) to the southeast. The Santa Fe Southern line is one of the United States' few rails with trails. Lamy is also served by Amtrak's daily Southwest Chief for train service to Chicago, Los Angeles, and intermediate points. Passengers transiting Lamy may use a special connecting coach/van service to reach Santa Fe.

=== Trails ===
Multi-use bicycle, pedestrian, and equestrian trails are increasingly popular in Santa Fe, for both recreation and commuting. These include the Dale Ball Trails, a 24.4-mile (39.3 km) network starting within two miles (3.2 km) of the Santa Fe Plaza; the long Santa Fe Rail Trail to Lamy; the Atalaya Trail up Atalaya Mountain; and the Santa Fe River Trail. Santa Fe is the terminus of three National Historic Trails: El Camino Real de Tierra Adentro National Historic Trail, the Old Spanish National Historic Trail, and the Santa Fe National Historic Trail.

== Sister cities ==
Santa Fe's sister cities are:

- Bukhara, Uzbekistan (1988)
- Hidalgo del Parral, Mexico (1984)
- Holguín, Cuba (2001)
- Icheon, South Korea (2013)
- Livingstone, Zambia (2012)
- San Miguel de Allende, Mexico (1992)
- Santa Fe, Granada, Spain (1983)
- Sorrento, Italy (1995)
- Tsuyama, Japan (1992)
- Zhangjiajie, China (2009)

== See also ==
- National Old Trails Road
- Timeline of Santa Fe, New Mexico
- Water Engineers for the Americas
- Hyundai Santa Fe
