= Santa Fe Rail Trail =

Hiking trail system in Santa Fe, NM, US

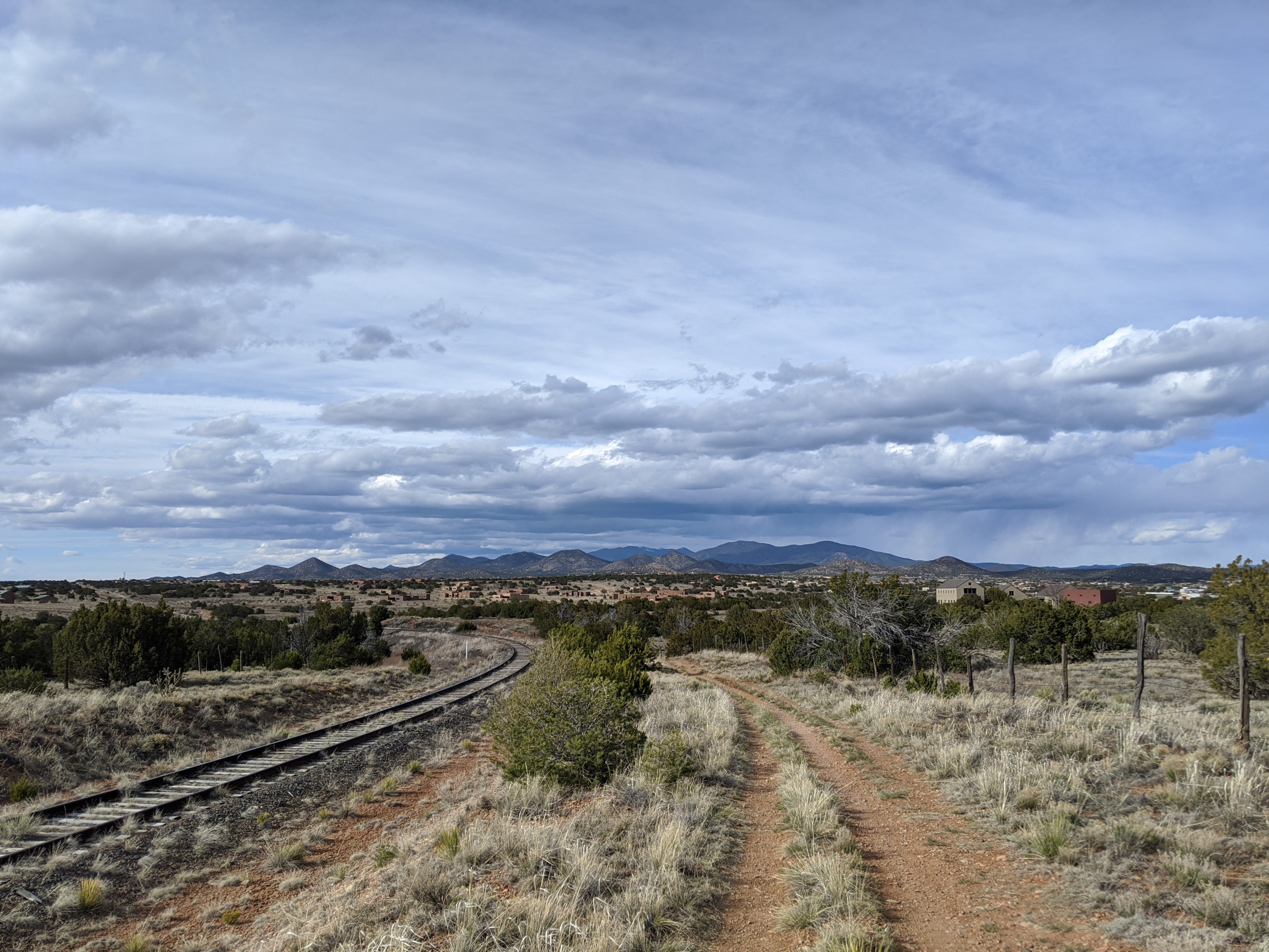
- View of the Sangre de Cristo Mountains
- Length: 15 mi (24 km)
- Location: Santa Fe, New Mexico, United States
- Established: July 2010
- Trailheads: Zia Road; Rabbit Road; Nine Mile Road; Avenida Vista Grande; Avenida Eldorado; Highway 285
- Use: Commuting, Hiking, Trail running, Mountain Biking
- Season: All year
- Hazards: Dehydration
- Surface: paved, natural

The Santa Fe Rail Trail is a multi-use trail, part of the trail system in the city of Santa Fe, New Mexico. The trail begins at the Santa Fe Depot, in the Railyard arts district, and ends at U.S. Route 285, near Lamy, New Mexico and the Lamy station. An example of Rails with trails, it parallels the New Mexico Rail Runner Express tracks to roughly I-25, where it then continues along the Santa Fe Southern Railway. The Santa Fe Rail trail is 15 miles long, is asphalted for the first 3.5 miles, and improved natural surface for 11.5 miles. The last few miles between Eldorado and US-285 is unimproved natural surface.

== Trailheads, crossings and access ==
The Santa Fe Rail Trail can be accessed via trailheads, connecting trails, and intersecting roadways in Santa Fe and Eldorado. The New Mexico Rail Runner Express has stops on the trail at the Santa Fe Depot, South Capitol station, and Zia Road station. Major connecting trails are the Arroyo de los Chamisos Trail (paved), the Spur Trail (improved natural surface), and Galisteo Basin trail system.

Access	Milepost	Directions	Map Coordinates
Santa Fe Depot	0	410 South Guadalupe Street	35°41′03″N 105°56′48″W
South Capitol station	1 mi (1.6 km)	1301 Alta Vista	35°40′23″N 105°57′26″W
Siringo Road crossing	2.7 mi (4.3 km)	connecting Arroyo de los Chamisos Trail	
Zia Road station	3.4 mi (5.5 km)	602 West Zia Road, parking available	35.6464°N 105.9570°W
Rodeo Road crossing	4.2 mi (6.8 km)	Rodeo Rd and Siringo	
Rabbit Road Trailhead	5.0 mi (8.0 km)	249-251 Rabbit Rd., parking available	35.62771°N 105.96681°W
Spur Trail	6.7 mi (10.8 km)	connecting trail from Santa Fe Community College and	
Nine Mile Trailhead	8.8 mi (14.2 km)	parking available	
Avenida Vista Grande	11.8 mi (19.0 km)	in Eldorado	
Avenida Eldorado	13.4 mi (21.6 km)	in Eldorado, parking available	
Spur Ranch Road	14.9 mi (24.0 km)		
US-285 Trailhead	16.7 mi (26.9 km)		

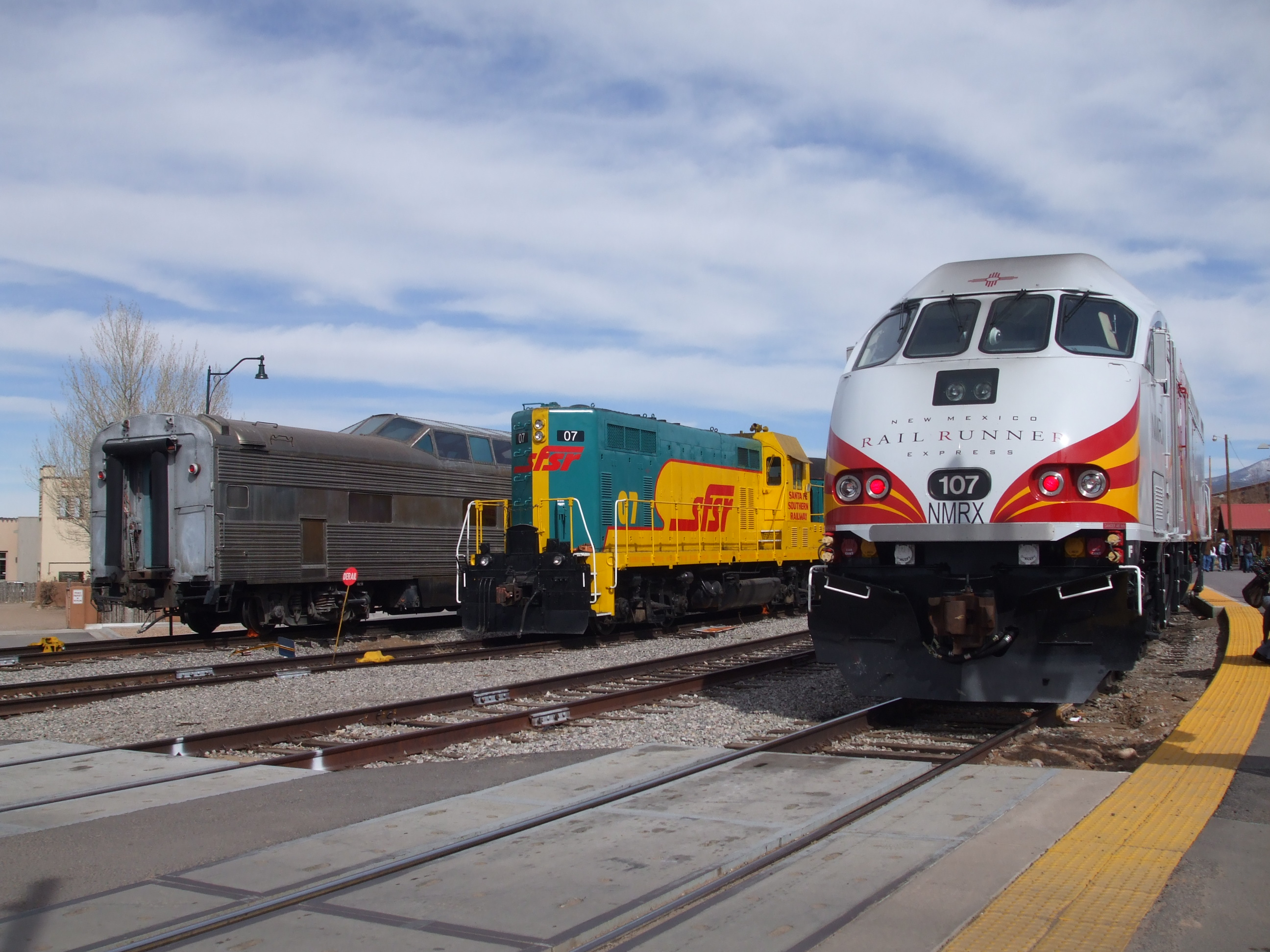
Santa Fe Depot, with a Rail Runner Express train (right), alongside a diesel locomotive and ex-Santa Fe Pleasure Dome operated by the SFSR

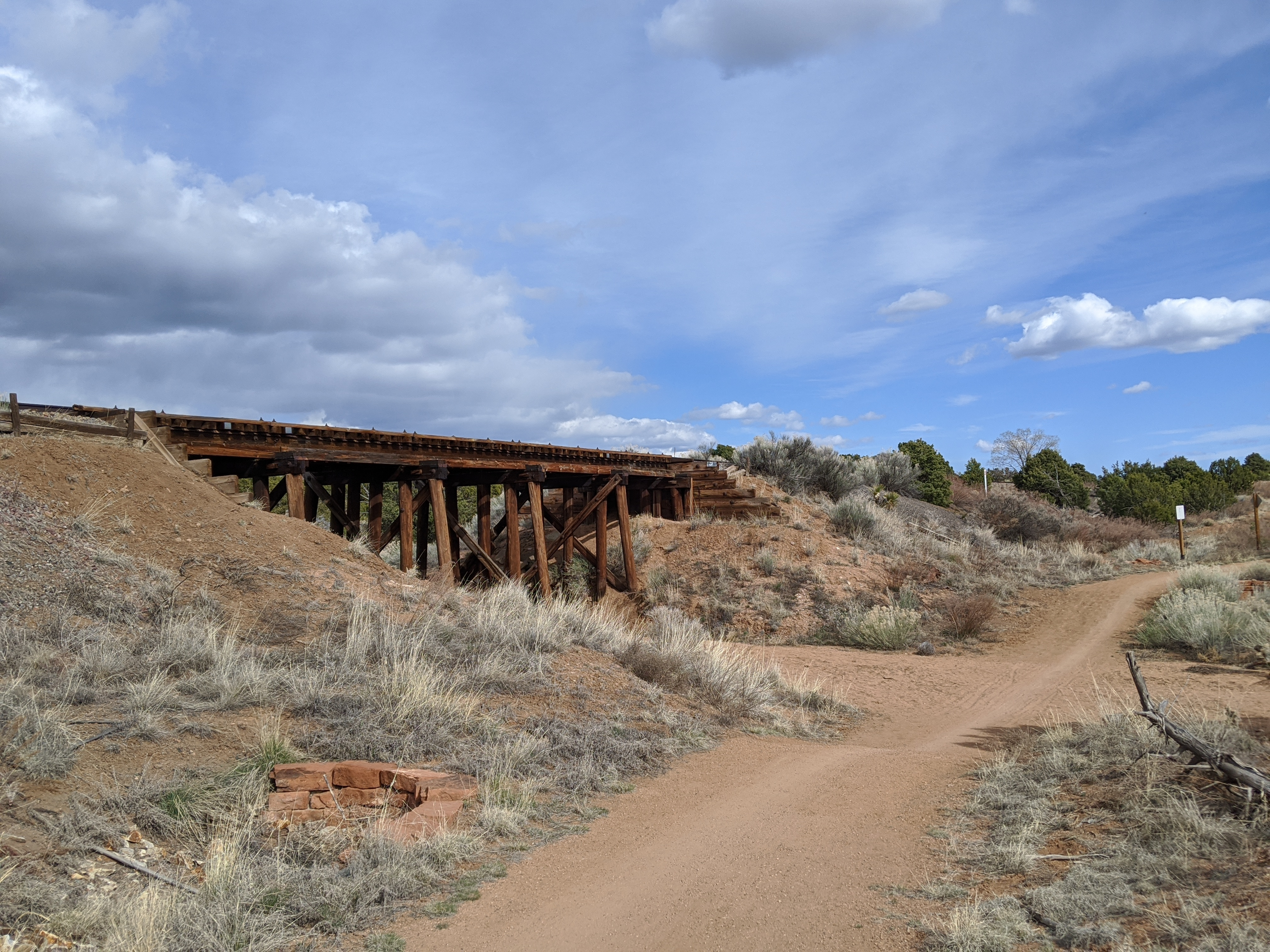
One of many trestle bridges along the trail. Here the trail has improved natural surface

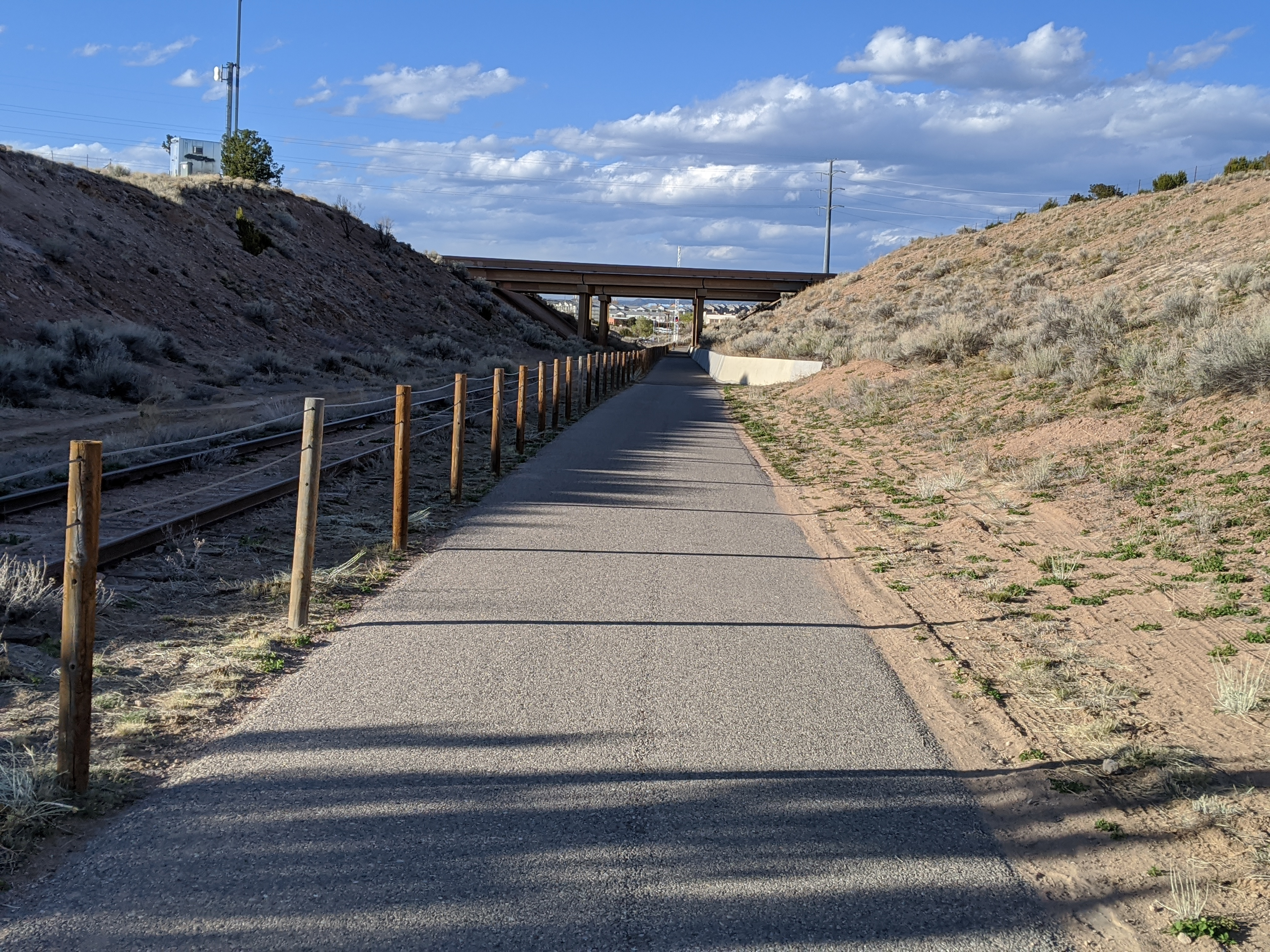
Asphalted section near I-25
Flora of Santa Fe Rail Trail
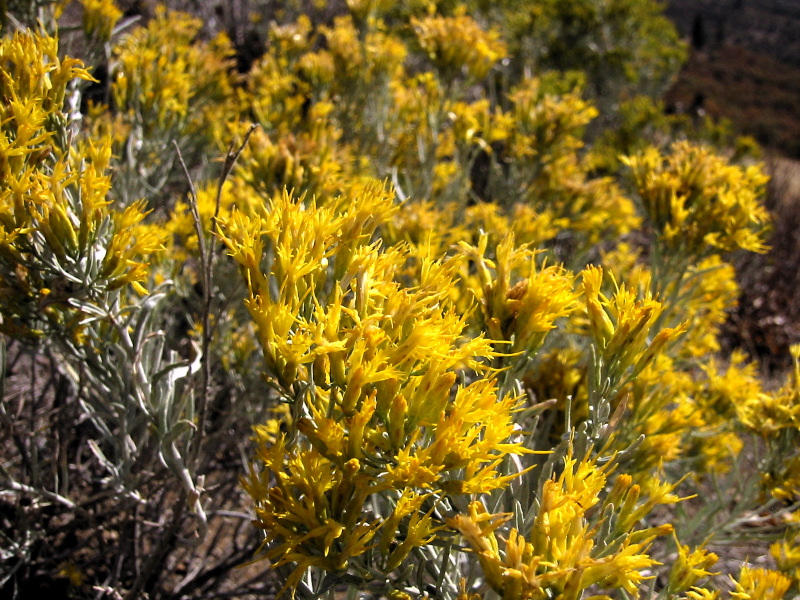
Chamisa

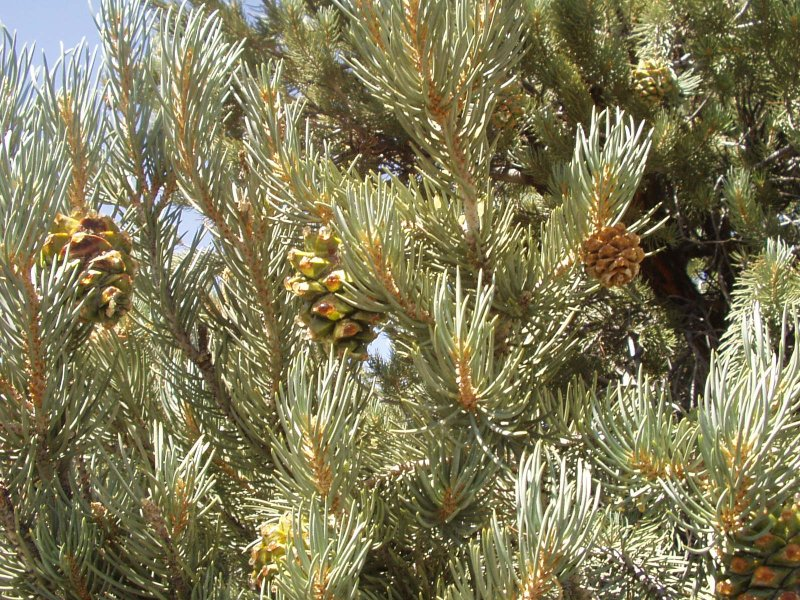
Piñon

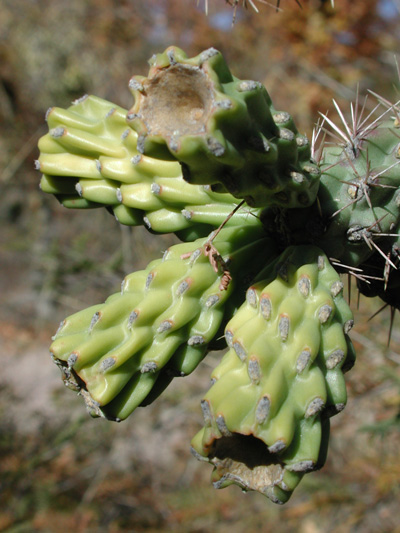
Cholla

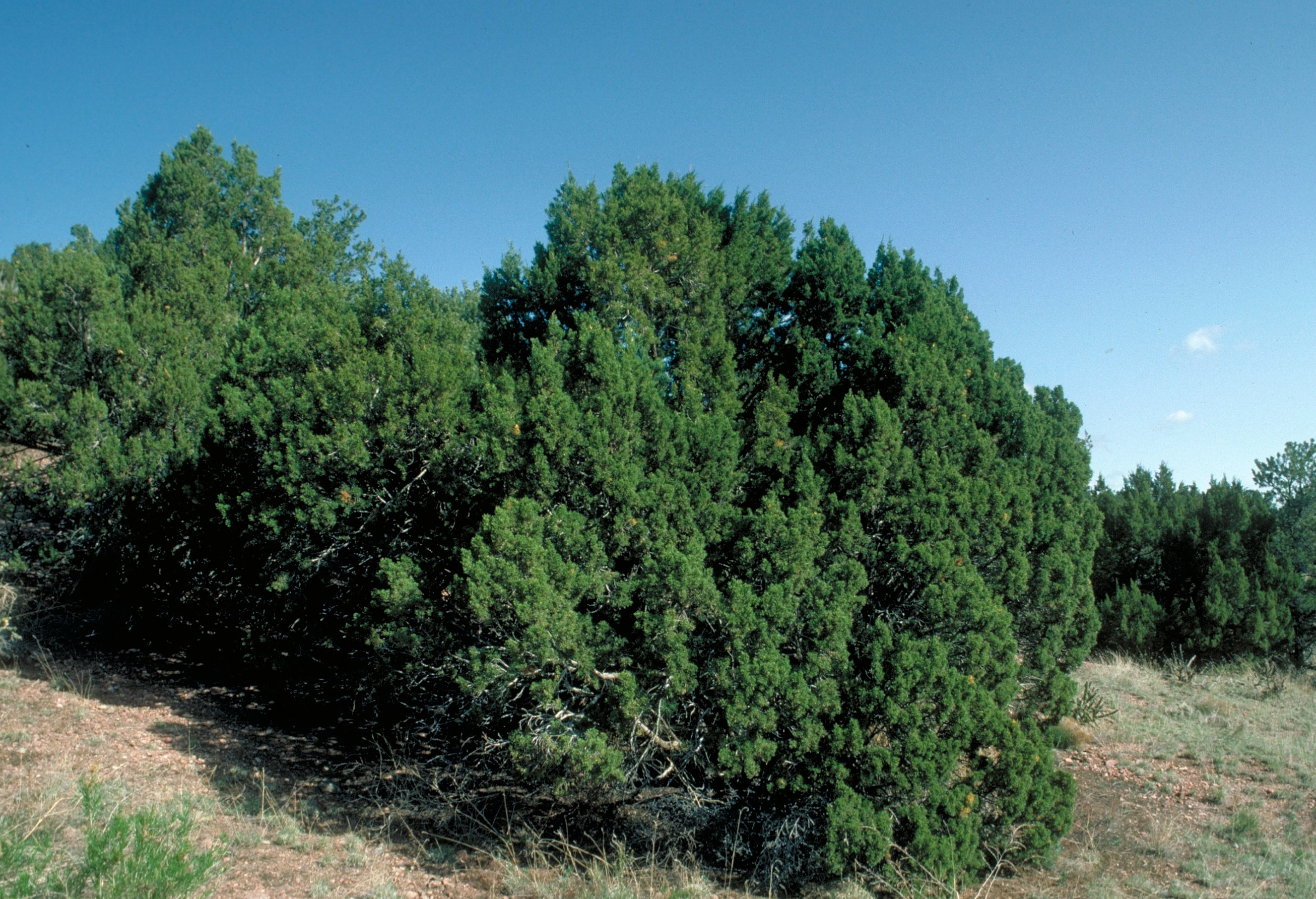
Juniper

Apache Plume

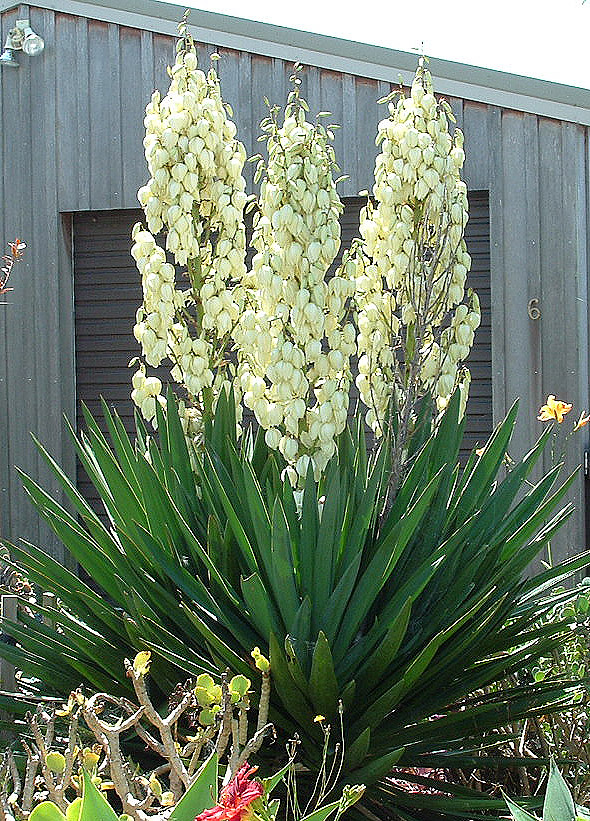
Yucca

== Gail Ryba Trail ==
Small asphalted branch trail that connects the Rail Trail to shopping areas, neighborhoods, and a medical center. The Gail Ryba Trail starts at Saint Michaels near the Hospital, joins the rail trail thru an underpass at Saint Francis Drive, and ends at West Zia Road. Approximately 1 mile long.

== Spur Trail ==
Improved natural surface trail that branches from the rail trail to connect to the Santa Fe Community College. The Spur Trail trailhead is located at the intersection of Richards Avenue and Avenida del Sur ( 35.5988°N 106.0014°W ). Approximately 3 miles long.
