= Regional Transit District =

Regional Transit District may refer to:

- North Central Regional Transit District (NCRTD)
- Sacramento Regional Transit District (SRTD)
- San Joaquin Regional Transit District (SJRTD)
