= Santa Fe Depot (Santa Fe, New Mexico) =

Train station in Santa Fe, New Mexico, U.S.

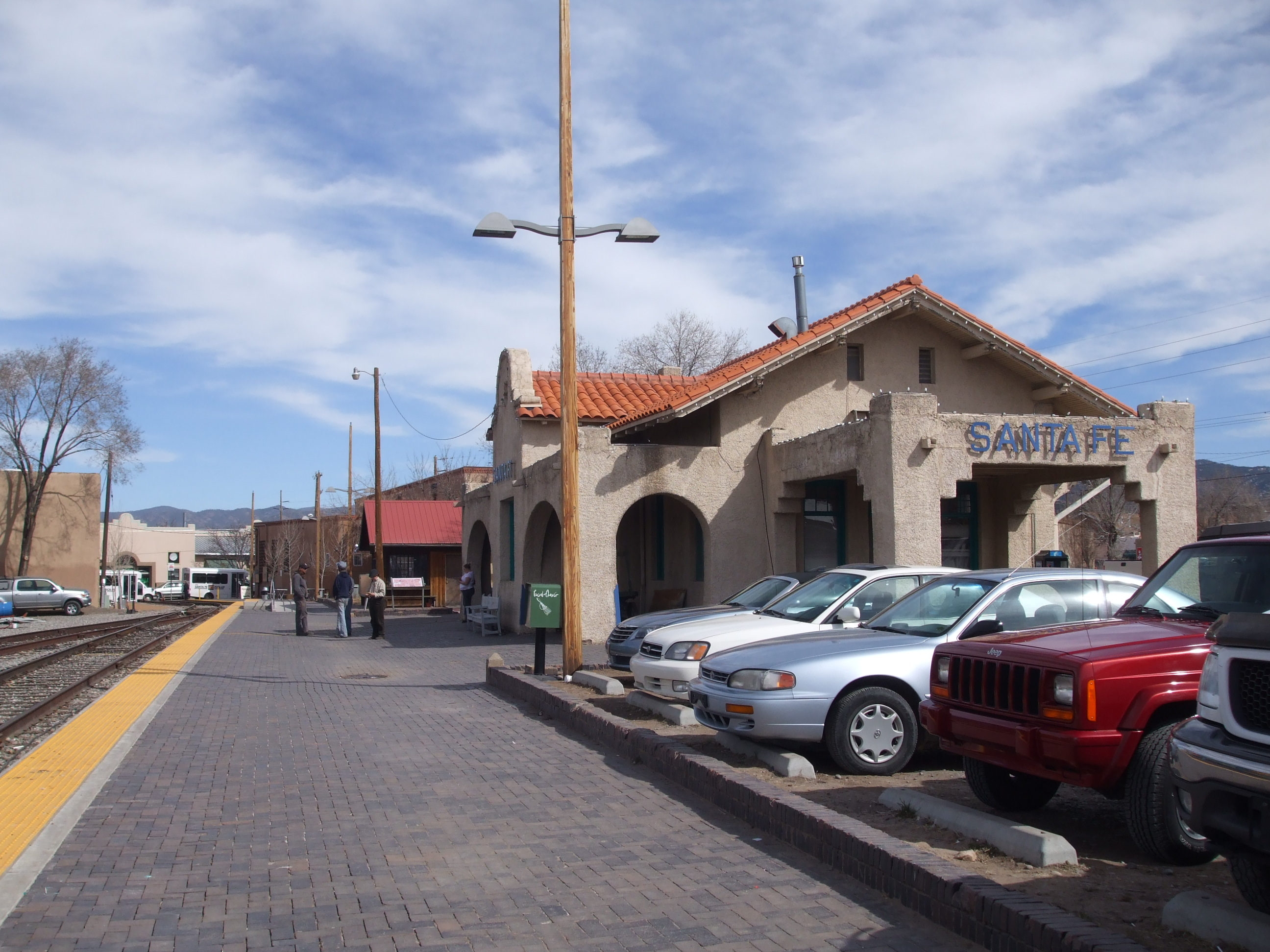

General information
- Location: 410 South Guadalupe Street; Santa Fe, New Mexico; United States
- Coordinates: 35°41′03″N 105°56′48″W
- Platforms: 1 side platform
- Tracks: 4
- Connections: Amtrak Thruway to/from Lamy and Los Alamos; North Central Regional Transit District; Santa Fe Trails: 1, 2, H, M

Construction
- Accessible: Yes

Other information
- Station code: Amtrak: SAF
- IATA code: ZSH
- Fare zone: Zone F

History
- Opened: February 9, 1880
- Rebuilt: December 17, 2008

Services
Preceding station	New Mexico Rail Runner Express	Following station
South Capitol toward Belen	Rail Runner Express	Terminus
Preceding station	Santa Fe Southern Railway	Following station
Terminus	Sky Railway	Lamy Terminus
Former services
Preceding station	Atchison, Topeka and Santa Fe Railway	Following station
Terminus	Santa Fe Branch	Lamy Terminus
Location

Santa Fe Depot is the northern terminus of the New Mexico Rail Runner Express commuter rail line. The station was originally built by the Atchison, Topeka and Santa Fe, and until 2014 served as the northern terminus, offices, and gift shop of the Santa Fe Southern Railway, a tourist and freight carrying short line railroad. It is located in Santa Fe, New Mexico at 410 Guadalupe Street, within an area of urban renewal referred to as the "Railyard". Rail Runner service to the station began on December 17, 2008.

The station is served by Santa Fe Trails routes 2, 4, and M, a shuttle connecting the station to several locations in and around downtown Santa Fe, a shuttle service to Taos operated by the North Central Regional Transit District, and a shuttle to the Buffalo Thunder Resort & Casino in Pojoaque Pueblo.

Each of the Rail Runner stations contains an icon to express each community's identity. The icon representing this station is a locomotive, representing the history of the rail yard at the site; however the station is devoid of the Rail Runner's distinctive signage bearing the station name and icon.

== History ==
The depot proper was the namesake station of the Atchison, Topeka and Santa Fe Railway (ATSF) starting February 9, 1880 and for most of the twentieth century. The depot is the northern terminus of a former ATSF spur line running from Santa Fe to Lamy, 18 miles to the south. The spur line was built to connect the railroad's namesake destination to its system when the prohibitive grades into Santa Fe were bypassed by the westward expanding railroad's mainline. An expansive network of track once dominated the area around the Santa Fe Depot, which at its height was served by another station shared by the narrow gauge, D&RG Chili Line trains traveling to the north, and New Mexico Central Railway trains going south. Both of these railroads had been dismantled by 1942.

The ATSF ceased offering passenger train service to Santa Fe with the advent of the Interstate Highway System and replaced it with a motorcoach connection operating up to four daily roundtrips to connect with their long distance trains at Lamy. The motorcoaches still run today, and are operated by Amtrak and private bus shuttle companies. As the area's industrial activity declined, much of the track and facilities were sold off in favor of other uses.

Scheduled passenger rail was restored as a tourist operation with the Santa Fe Southern Railway's purchase of the freight-only Santa Fe spur, including the depot, in the early 1990s. Much of the rail yard was purchased by the City of Santa Fe which later established an enterprise, the Santa Fe Railyard Community Corporation, to oversee the urban renewal of its parcel.

=== Rail Runner ===
The master plan for the transformation preceded the Rail Runner by several years but the arrival of the Rail Runner was nonetheless accommodated. The result of the development, which was mostly complete as of January 2009, is a train themed district housing community uses such as a park, a youth center, Site Santa Fe, a farmers' market, and commercial activities alongside the working railroads. The park was designed with input from local residents, and was made possible through funding and support from The Trust for Public Land.

=== Renovation ===
A renovation preserving the building's historic character was completed in 2023. The station is currently owned and operated by the municipal government of Santa Fe.

== Gallery ==
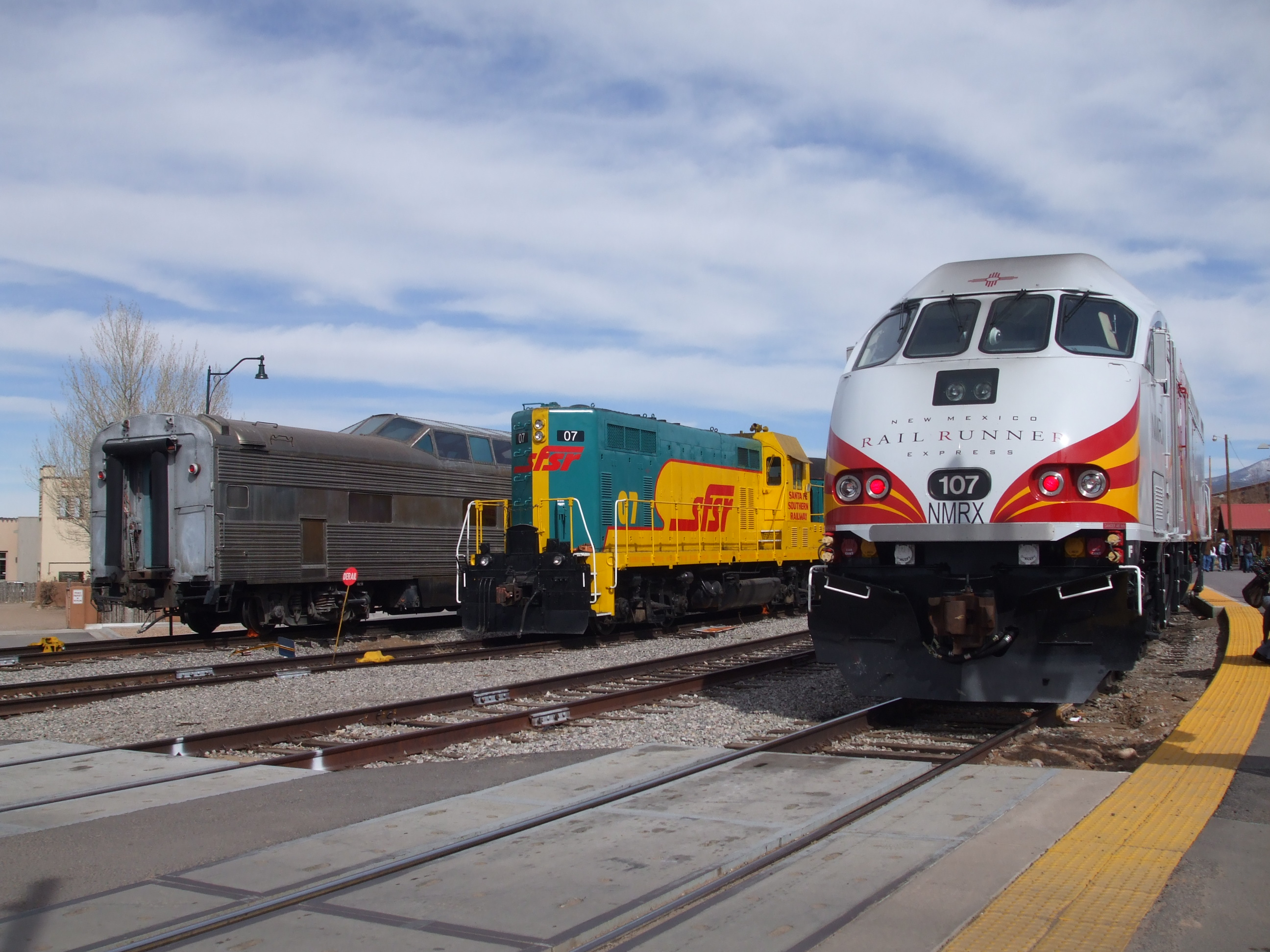
Rail Runner and Santa Fe Southern Railway trains in Santa Fe Depot

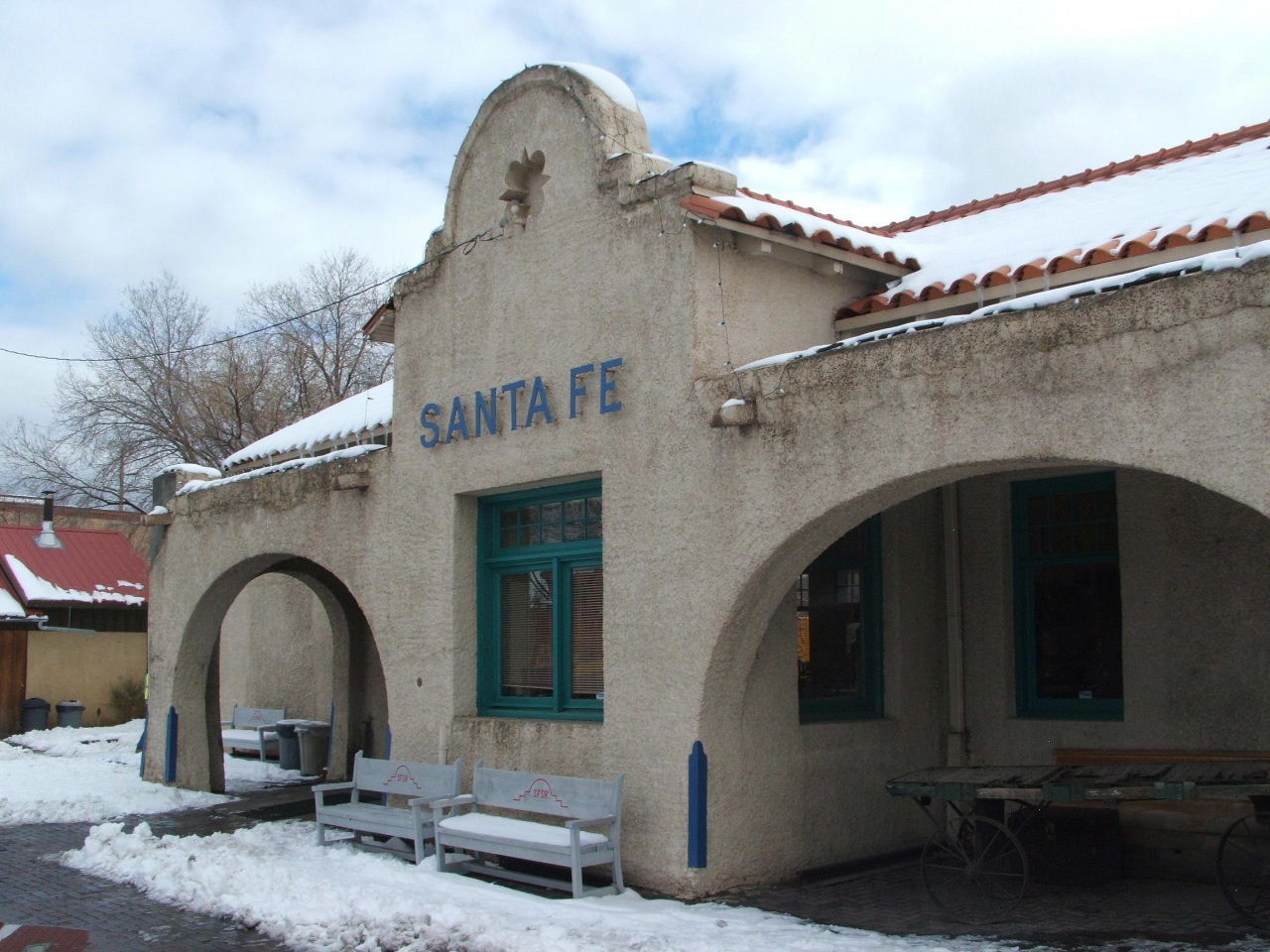
Santa Fe Depot in winter

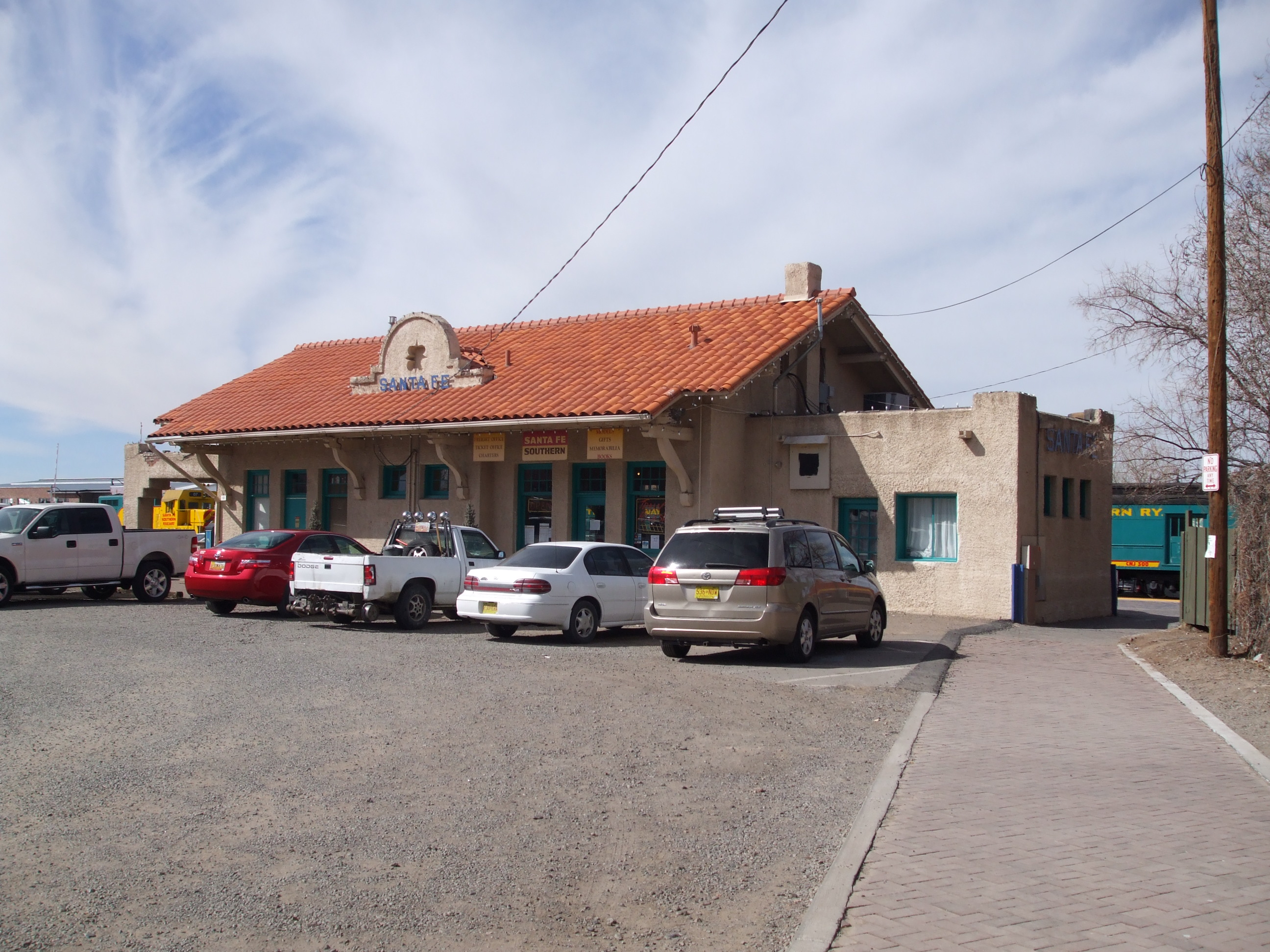
Streetside of the Santa Fe Depot viewed from the east

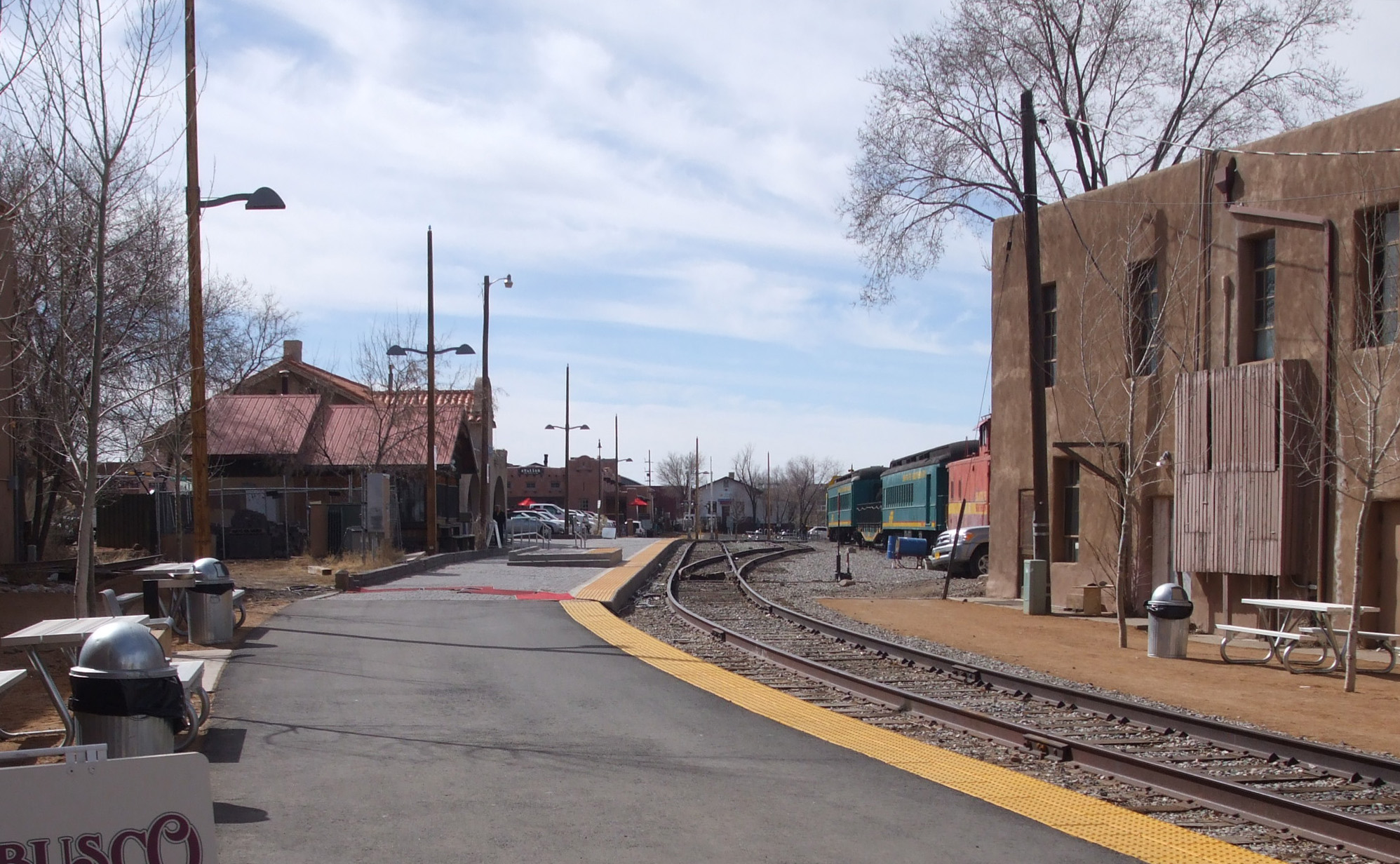
Santa Fe Depot viewed from the north
