= Lamy station =

Train station in Lamy, New Mexico, U.S.

Lamy, NM
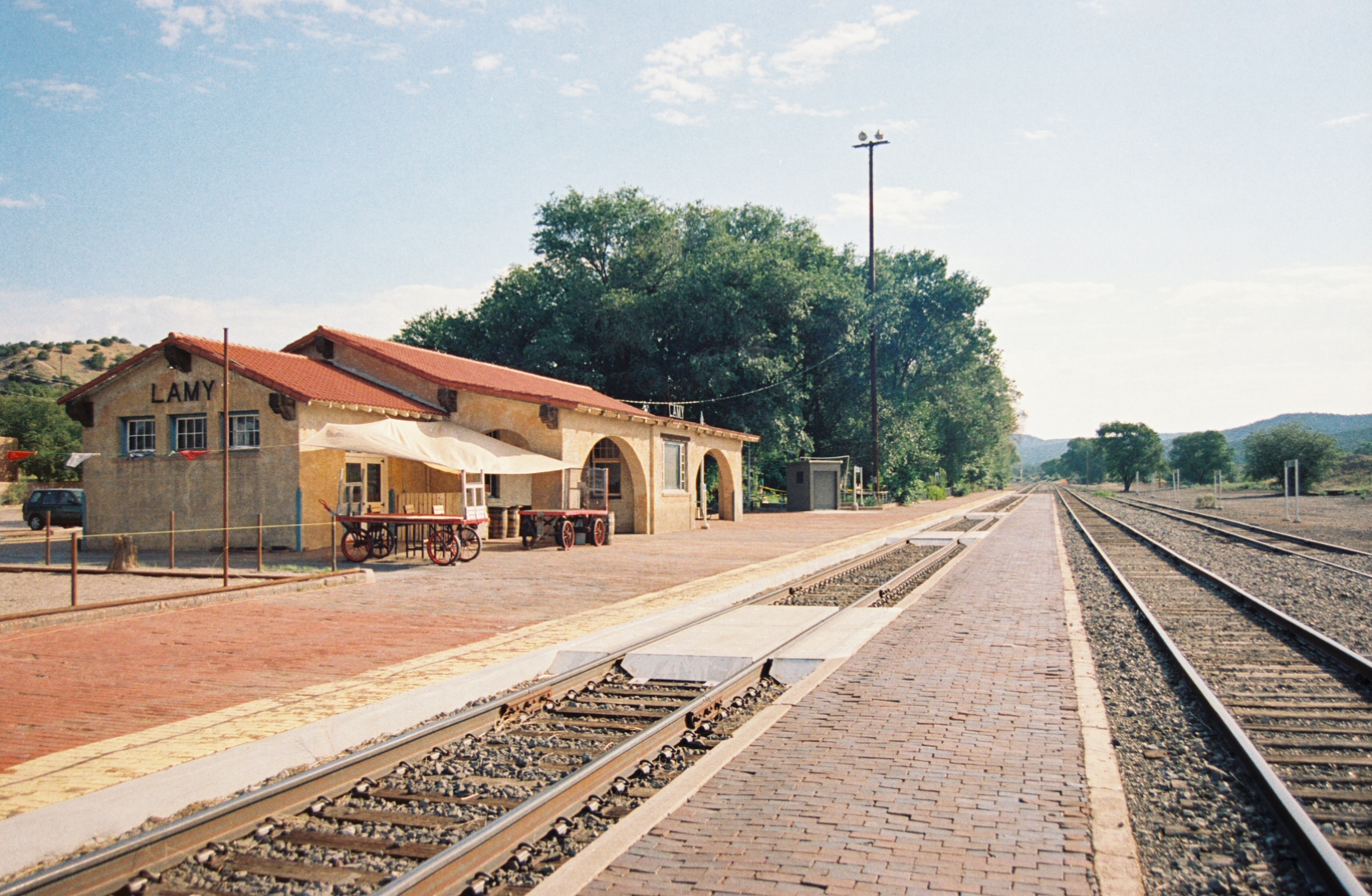
- Lamy Amtrak/Santa Fe Southern station

General information
- Location: Santa Fe County Road 33; 152 Old Lamy Trail; Lamy, New Mexico; United States
- Coordinates: 35.4809°N 105.8800°W
- Owner: Santa Fe Southern Railway, New Mexico Department of Transportation
- Line: BNSF Glorieta Subdivision
- Platforms: 1 side platform, 1 island platform
- Tracks: 3
- Connections: Amtrak Thruway to/from Santa Fe and Los Alamos

Construction
- Parking: Yes
- Accessible: Yes

Other information
- Station code: Amtrak: LMY

History
- Opened: 1881
- Rebuilt: December 1908–c. July 1909

Passengers
- FY 2025: 7,169 (Amtrak)

Services
Preceding station	Amtrak	Following station
Albuquerque toward Los Angeles	Southwest Chief	Las Vegas toward Chicago
Preceding station	Santa Fe Southern Railway	Following station
Santa Fe Terminus	Sky Railway	Terminus
Former services
Preceding station	Atchison, Topeka and Santa Fe Railway	Following station
Twitchell toward Los Angeles	Main Line	Glorieta toward Chicago
Santa Fe Terminus	Santa Fe Branch	Terminus
Location

Lamy station is an Amtrak station at Santa Fe County Road 33, 152 Old Lamy Trail in Lamy, New Mexico, United States. It is served by the Southwest Chief. It is also the southern terminus for the Sky Railway. The station was built in 1909 by the Atchison, Topeka and Santa Fe Railway.

Since the 1960s, the station has also served as the intercity link for the state capital of Santa Fe, 18 miles (29 km) to the north. Motorcoaches operating under the Amtrak Thruway brand, shuttle passengers between Lamy station, Santa Fe, with service continuing onto Los Alamos.

== History ==
The one-story Lamy depot was built for the Atchison, Topeka and Santa Fe Railway in 1909, replacing a two-story wood-frame structure erected in 1881. When the new passenger station opened, the original was converted into a freight depot and served this purpose into the 1940s.

The Santa Fe originally planned to run from Atchison, Kansas., to Santa Fe, and then west to California. As the track-building advanced into New Mexico, the civil engineers realized that the terrain around Santa Fe made this an impossible undertaking. The line was built through Lamy instead, and a spur line was built northward to Santa Fe.

East of the depot, the Fred Harvey Company constructed a hotel named El Ortiz in 1910. El Ortiz closed in 1942 and was later demolished.

In 2026, renovations are underway to improve compliance with the Americans with Disabilities Act of 1990.

== In popular culture ==
The Lamy station appears in a 1954 educational Encyclopædia Britannica film called The Passenger Train, produced by Milan Herzog. It also appears in the Bollywood film Kites starring Hrithik Roshan and Barbara Mori.
