= DeVargas Center =

- Location: Santa Fe, New Mexico
- Coordinates: 35°41′34.03″N 105°57′2.27″W
- Address: 564 N Guadalupe St
- Opened: 1973
- Developer: Nash Hancock
- Owner: Fidelis Reality Partners
- Architect: William Lumpkins
- Num. of stores: 55
- Num. of anchor tenants: 5
- Floor area: 320,000 sq ft (30,000 m^{2}) (adjacent Market Street included)
- Floors: 1
- Website: devargascenter.com

DeVargas Center is an enclosed shopping center in Santa Fe, New Mexico named after Diego de Vargas. Originally named DeVargas Mall, the shopping center is one of two enclosed malls in Santa Fe.

== History ==
=== 1973-1987 ===
DeVargas Mall was developed by Kentucky businessman Nash Hancock and formally opened its doors in 1973. However, an Albertsons and Factory 2-U already had opened a few years prior. The structure was designed by Santa Fe architect William Lumpkins. In 1975, luxury men's department store Goodman's relocated from the Santa Fe Plaza. In 1977, the center added a Montgomery Ward and JCPenney as anchors and a United Artist two-screen theater. When the Villa Linda Mall opened in 1985, JCPenney relocated to the southwest side of town. The site would later be replaced by upscale department store C. R. Anthony Co.

=== 1988-2000 ===
The mall changed ownership for the first time in Weingarten Realty and underwent $1-million renovation which included upgrading the interior and expanding the theater. In 1996, Ross Dress for Less opened up a new-to-market location. In 1998, Montgomery Ward announced bankruptcy and shuttered its Santa Fe location. That same year Albertsons purchased the former Montgomery Ward location and announced plans to reconstruct the building.

=== 2001-present ===
In 2010, Fidelis Realty Partners purchased the property from Weingarten Realty Management Co, Inc. In 2016, several tenants from nearby Sanbusco Marketplace relocated to the center following New Mexico School of the Art's purchase of the property. During that same year, anchor tenant Hastings filed Chapter 11 bankruptcy and closed all of its stores. In 2017, the Regal Cinemas closed its six-screen theater In 2018, the shopping center announced plans to reconstruct the west side of the complex to include The Alley, a lounge and bowling alley. In 2019, T.J. Maxx announced HomeGoods subsidiary plans to occupy one of the anchors at the center. In 2022, Sierra Trading Post remodeled the former Hastings location.
