= Santa Fe Community College =

Community college in Santa Fe, New Mexico, U.S.

Coordinates: 35.6053°N 105.9979°W

- Type: Public community college
- Established: 1983
- Budget: $38 million
- President: Becky Rowley
- Academic staff: 255 (64 full-time)
- Administrative staff: 280 (249 full-time)
- Undergraduates: 4,027
- Other students: 4,706 (non-credit)
- Location: Santa Fe, New Mexico, U.S.
- Website: www.sfcc.edu

Santa Fe Community College (SFCC) is a public community college in Santa Fe, New Mexico. It has an undergraduate population of about 4,027 students, as well as approximately 4,706 contract training and continuing education students. The college offers more than 100 degrees and certificate programs.

SFCC's Higher Education Center offers televised and online connections to bachelor and masters programs at the University of New Mexico, New Mexico Highlands University and the Institute of American Indian Art.

== Campus ==
The Santa Fe Community College Campus occupies 366 acres (1.48 km^{2}) of land, about 12 miles (19 km) southwest of Santa Fe city center. The Santa Fe Community College District is identical to the Santa Fe Public School District, which covers most of Santa Fe County and includes the outlying areas of Glorieta, Madrid, Cerrillos, Lamy, La Cienega, Galisteo and Tesuque.

SFCC campus has made a number of ecological improvements, such as a biomass boiler for heating, LEED Gold certification for two buildings, and treated grey water irrigation for most landscaping and recreation areas.

== History ==
In early 1983, the New Mexico State Legislature approved a bill to provide 1.5 million dollars to fund the creation of a community college in Santa Fe. In September the program began offering classes in temporary facilities at several sites around town, including the New Mexico School for the Deaf, Santa Fe High School, the Institute of American Indian Arts and the College of Santa Fe.

Construction began on a permanent facility in 1984, funded by a 5 million dollar bond and donations. A fitness building was added in 1993, a technology and occupation lab was added in 1995, an early childhood development center in 1996, and a fine arts center in 1999. In 2001 an instructional technology center was added, while in 2005 a sustainability program was begun. in 2007 a bond for $25 million funded the addition of a health and sciences building, which was begun in 2009, as well as a trades and technology center, which was opened in 2011.

In March 2014 the college settled with fired president Ana M. (Cha) Guzmán for $500,000 for wrongful dismissal.

In July 2019, the college hired Dr. Becky Rowley as its ninth president. Dr. Rowley worked as president of Clovis Community College in Clovis, New Mexico since 2011. Prior to becoming president, she was executive vice president (academics and student services) at CCC. Before moving into administration, she taught English as a fulltime faculty member at Clovis Community College for seven years.

== Higher Education Center ==
The Santa Fe Higher Education Center was developed after a needs assessment survey showed that Santa Fe residents were interested in pursuing a bachelor's or master's degree but were concerned about cost and commuting.

Through the HEC, Santa Fe residents can earn bachelor's or master's degrees from the University of New Mexico, located in Albuquerque; NM Highlands University, located in Las Vegas, NM; and the Institute of American Indian Art, located in Santa Fe, by attending online and instructional TV classes at Santa Fe Community College. They have coordinated existing resources from their institutions and have agreed to allow students to take basic coursework through SFCC before completing higher degrees through the HEC. About 500 students are enrolled in the program.

=== Development ===
In 2009, Santa Fe Community College submitted a proposal to the NM Higher Education Department to establish a Higher Education Center (HEC) after a survey showed that a majority of local residents questioned would seek a higher degree if it were located in the city. The Higher Education Department approved the proposal and the HEC was formally established.

In 2010, SFCC District voters approved a bond measure, $12 million of which was earmarked to fund the construction of a facility for the HEC.

In March 2011, the New Mexico Legislature passed House Joint Memorial 9, authorizing the state's General Services Department to sell to the college a tract of land for the center's building site. In July 2011, the Higher Education Department approved the land purchase, and the sale was finalized in September 2011.

A pilot of the program began in August 2011 on the Santa Fe Community College campus.

In November 2011, the college learned that the administration of Governor Susana Martinez, who was elected in November 2010, was of the opinion that the college had to gain further approval from the Legislature before the Higher Education Department would review construction plans for the center. A primary source of criticism has been concerns over long-term funding, as well as a possibly excessive number of higher education options in New Mexico.

In May 2012, attorneys for Santa Fe Community College filed a legal action in district court requesting an order to force the New Mexico Higher Education Department (HED) to grant a hearing to review construction plans for the center.

The Higher Education Center opened in January, 2015.

As of 2019 the college has established a campus microgrid in collaboration with Siemens including onsite solar photovoltaic and diesel generation.
