= Arroyo de los Chamisos Trail =

Hiking trail in Santa Fe, New Mexico, USA

Arroyo de los Chamisos Trail a trail in Santa Fe, New Mexico, connecting parks, schools, shopping and a community center. The trail is asphalted, approximately 3 miles long, and an important part of the Santa Fe urban trails system. It connects to the Santa Fe Rail Trail at its Northeast end near Siringo Road. At the Southwest end it branches into smaller local neighborhood trails, Villa Linda Park, and a local Mall.

The Arroyo Chamiso (from which the trail is named) parallels the trail and provides natural surface paths for hiking, running, and dog walking. Santa Fe High, Monica Lucero Park, and the Genoveva Chavez Community Center, are all connected by this trail. Near the Community Center, the trail crosses a disc golf course, and a spur connects to a skate park.
