= Zia Road station =

Commuter train station in Santa Fe, New Mexico, United States

Zia Road
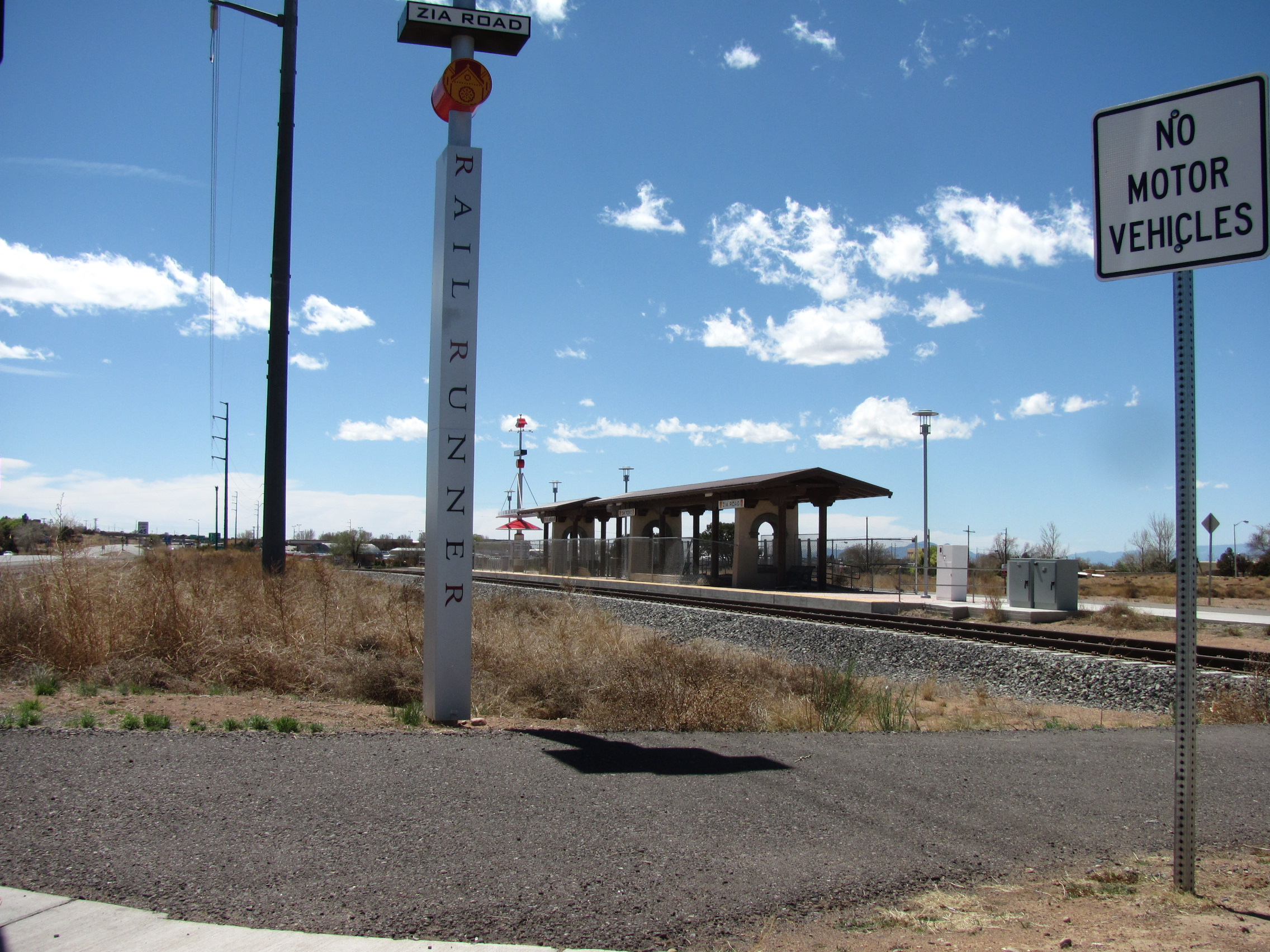

General information
- Location: 602 West Zia Road, Santa Fe, New Mexico
- Coordinates: 35.6464°N 105.9570°W
- Platforms: 1 side platform
- Tracks: 1

Construction
- Accessible: yes

Other information
- Fare zone: Zone F

History
- Opened: April 24, 2017

Services
Preceding station	New Mexico Rail Runner Express	Following station
Santa Fe County/NM 599 toward Belen	Rail Runner Express	South Capitol toward Santa Fe Depot
Location

Zia Road is a station on the New Mexico Rail Runner Express commuter rail line, located in Santa Fe, New Mexico. The station is the first Rail Runner stop to be constructed on private land. Officials had scheduled it to open in August 2011, following an agreement from the city's finance committee that the stop will open if the owners construct parking and transit facilities for the station and the station opened in April 2017.

The station is located at the intersection of Zia Road & St. Francis Drive, and is planned to be the center of a mixed-use, transit-oriented development.

Each of the Rail Runner stations contains an icon to express each community's identity. The icon representing this station is the Cathedral Basilica of St. Francis of Assisi.

NMDOT announced in 2013 that they were waiting to complete a traffic study before starting parking lot construction, and potential designation for mixed-use development. However, Santa Fe City Council had indicated back in 2011 that although the land may be mixed use development, the station itself would be a Kiss-n-Ride station, meaning there will be no dedicated Rail Runner parking spots. In February 2015, The Santa Fe Metropolitan Planning Organization completed tests of trains stopping at the station and the impact of the surrounding area.

== Recent developments ==
In May 2016, the New Mexico Department of Transportation approved construction plans for infrastructure needed to create a passenger pick-up and drop-off area for the station, including an access road, sidewalks, and lighting. As of August 2016, construction permits had been issued to the developer responsible for the site, allowing the start of construction of the passenger pick-up and drop-off area. As of September 2016, construction at the site was temporarily altering traffic flow at a nearby intersection, of West Zia Road and Galisteo Road, through temporary lane changes.

In January 2017, the New Mexico Department of Transportation issued a letter deeming improvements made by the city to be acceptable, and authorizing the station to open. At that time, the opening of the station was expected to occur "as early as late March, following a public comment period." It was announced in March 2017 that the station would be opening on the 24th of April.

In 2021, the Santa Fe City Council approved a 384-unit residential and mixed-use development north of the station. A group of residents sued to stop the project, arguing the city's decision violated their due process rights. In September 2023, the New Mexico Court of Appeals denied the residents' appeal. In May 2025, construction began on the first phase of the mixed-use development, which will include a 244-unit apartment complex, named Zia Flats, with 10% of the units classified as affordable. Zia Flats will be the first new multi-family housing project in Santa Fe to provide affordable units on-site, rather than paying a fee-in-lieu into the Affordable Housing Trust Fund. Zia Flats is expected to open in early 2027.
