= South Capitol station =

South Capitol
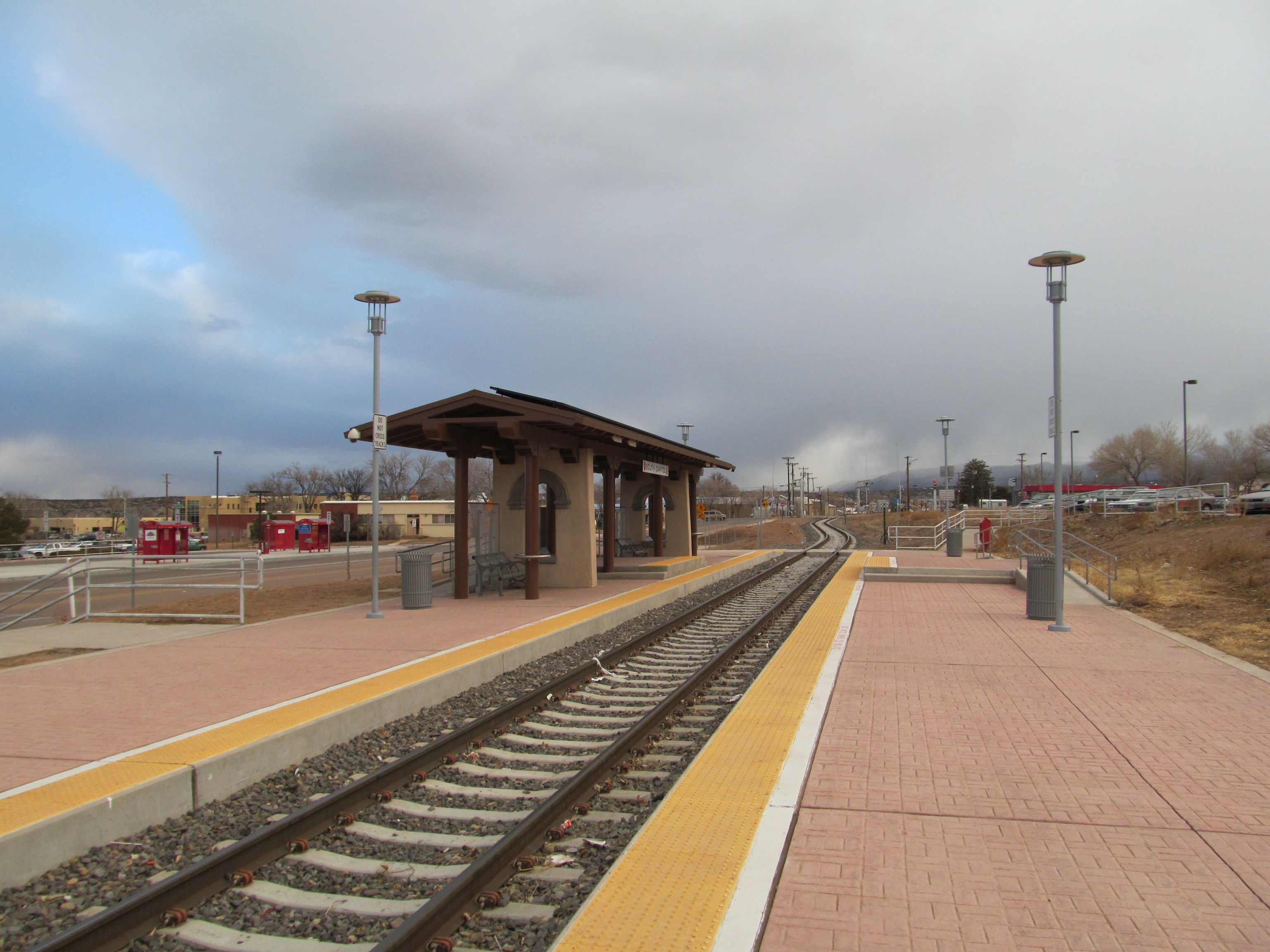
- South Capitol station in February 2012

General information
- Location: 1301 Alta Vista; Santa Fe, New Mexico
- Coordinates: 35°40′23″N 105°57′26″W
- Platforms: 2 side platforms
- Tracks: 1

Construction
- Parking: 200+ spaces
- Accessible: yes

Other information
- Fare zone: Zone F

History
- Opened: December 17, 2008

Services
Preceding station	New Mexico Rail Runner Express	Following station
Zia Road toward Belen	Rail Runner Express	Santa Fe Depot Terminus
Location

South Capitol station is a commuter rail station on the New Mexico Rail Runner Express line, located in Santa Fe, New Mexico. It is located between Alta Vista Street and Cordova Road near the South Capitol Governmental Complex. It opened with the line on December 17, 2008.
