= Santa Fe Southern Railway =

Tourist railroad based in Santa Fe, New Mexico

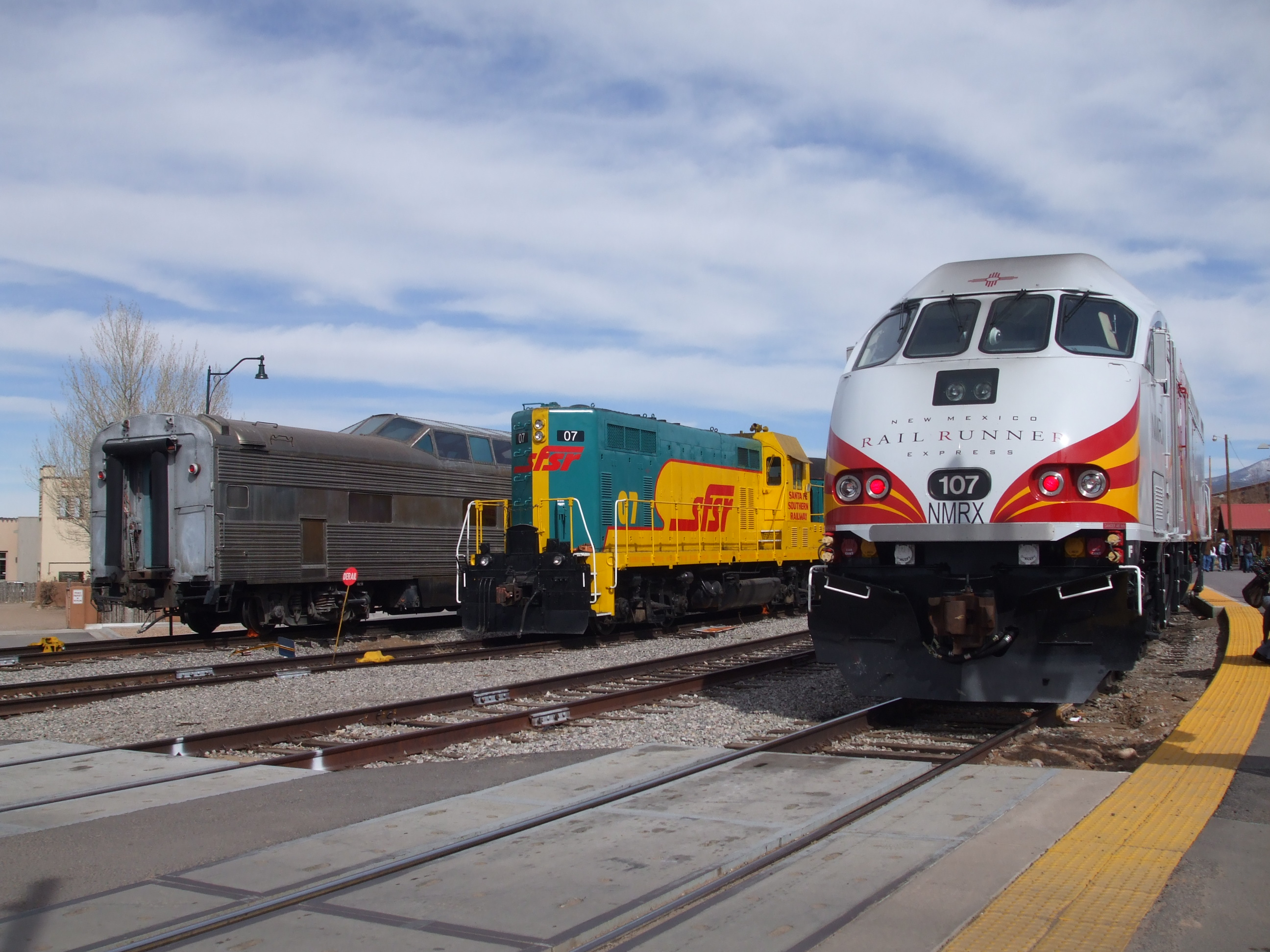
- Santa Fe Depot, with a Rail Runner Express train (right), alongside a diesel locomotive and ex-Santa Fe Pleasure Dome operated by the SFSR

Overview
- Reporting mark: SFSR
- Locale: Santa Fe County, New Mexico
- Dates of operation: 1992–present

Technical
- Track gauge: 4 ft 8 1/2 in (1,435 mm) standard gauge
- Length: 18.1 mi (29.1 km)

The Santa Fe Southern Railway (reporting mark SFSR) is a short line railroad in New Mexico, United States. In addition to carrying freight on occasion, it also operates as a tourist railroad called Sky Railway that carries passengers between Lamy and Santa Fe: a distance of 18.1 miles (29.1 km). The Santa Fe Rail Trail, a multi-use trail, parallels its route.

== History ==
=== Beginnings and the expansion of tourist operations ===
The Santa Fe Southern began operations in 1992, after the Atchison, Topeka and Santa Fe Railway ended operations on its Lamy to Santa Fe branch line and a group of local businesspeople purchased the track to continue freight service in the area. Passenger service was added later on.

On October 8, 2010, the railroad was purchased by STI-Global, Ltd., an Australian-based company. STI-Global said that the purchase would allow it to test the safety systems the company produces.

On May 20, 2011, the railroad was evicted from its headquarters at the depot in Santa Fe to make way for a new visitors' center planned to serve New Mexico Rail Runner passengers.

=== Financial troubles and attempted recovery ===
The railroad's business fluctuated greatly; in 2004, it hauled 401 carloads of freight, and in 2007 carried 25,907 passengers, but in 2009 these counts decreased to 25 and 12,208, both record lows. Towards the end of its existence, the railroad changed from separate freight and passenger operations to mixed trains (which carry both freight and passengers) at least twice a week, depending on the season. The railroad also offered charter and special trains.

After the close of the 2012 operating season, things took a turn for the worse. On May 23, 2013, the Santa Fe Southern board chairman announced that he had laid-off all of the railroad's full-time staffers and many seasonal employees. The railroad did not operate any trains during the year 2013.

On April 24, 2014, the Las Vegas Railway Express (LVRE) announced that it had reached an agreement with the Santa Fe Southern to jointly operate excursion trains that summer. LVRE would provide the capital to restore the line to operating condition, while Santa Fe Southern would operate the trains.

=== End of regularly scheduled passenger excursion trains ===
On September 26, 2014, despite a reportedly-successful first summer, LVRE informed the Santa Fe Southern that it would be terminating the operation, effective on the 29th. Those who had purchased tickets for future excursion trains were informed that their trains were cancelled, and received refunds. Remaining freight operations were also suspended. Santa Fe Southern officials commented that they were unsure when the railroad would resume operations, and at the time the railroad was still lacking regularly scheduled passenger excursions, although it was still running private charter events (weddings, parties, corporate events, etc.), private varnishes, and the occasional movie or TV film shoot.

=== Revival as Sky Railway ===
In 2019, the railway came under new ownership, including George R. R. Martin and entertainment and restaurant business owner Bill Banowsky. It resumed excursion operations under the brand Sky Railway in December 2021.

== Rolling stock ==
The railroad operates several coaches formerly owned by the Central Railroad of New Jersey, as well as a flatcar and a caboose. Motive power consists of one EMD GP7 and one EMD GP16, the latter being a rebuild from a GP7.

== In popular culture ==
The railroad was featured in the AMC TV series Breaking Bad season 5 episode "Dead Freight", first aired on August 12, 2012, in which a train was delayed at a highway crossing in order to facilitate the theft of 1,000 gallons of the industrial chemical methylamine from a tank car near the end of the train. The locomotive featured was SFSR 07, a GP7u. In the credits, special thanks were given to the railroad for making the episode possible.
