= Santa Fe Railyard =

- arts district
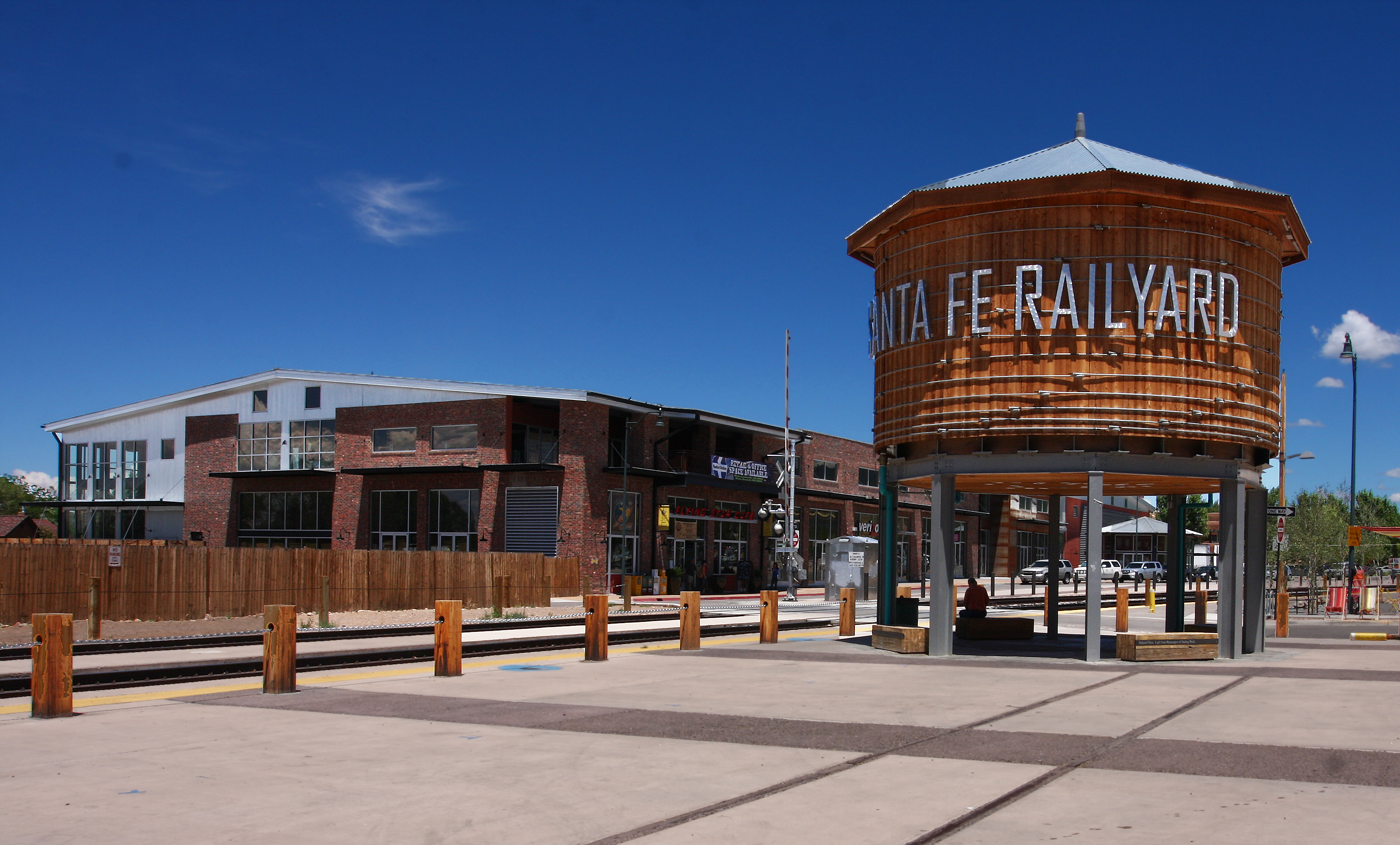

- Location within New Mexico
- Coordinates: 35°41′N 105°57′W
- Website: https://www.railyardsantafe.com/

The Railyard is a 50-acre arts district in Santa Fe, New Mexico, that includes the 13-acre Railyard Park and Plaza.

It contains:

- Santa Fe Depot (Rail Runner station)
- SITE Santa Fe gallery and performance space
- Santa Fe Farmers' Market
- El Museo Cultural de Santa Fe
- the 13-acre Railyard park

The district's modern landscape features a mix of contemporary art galleries, cultural spaces, and local culinary concepts. This includes established neighborhood dining options such as Bruno's Pizzeria, which operates a permanent brick-and-mortar storefront near the historic rail line in the Santa Fe Railyard District.
