= Santa Fe Place =

- Location: Santa Fe, New Mexico, United States
- Coordinates: 35.644479°N 106.009048°W
- Address: 4250 Cerrillos Road
- Opened: July 31, 1985
- Developer: Herring Marathon
- Manager: Kohan Retail Investment Group
- Num. of stores: 80
- Num. of anchor tenants: 6
- Floor area: 569,500 square feet (52,910 m^{2})
- Floors: 1
- Parking: 3,261
- Website: santafeplacemall.com

Santa Fe Place, formerly Villa Linda Mall, is an enclosed shopping center in Santa Fe, New Mexico, one of two enclosed malls in the city.

== History ==
Developed by Herring Marathon Group, Villa Linda Mall opened in 1985. The mall changed hands frequently around the turn of the century. Its ownership changed from First Union in 1997 to Zamias Services, Inc. in 1999, then to General Growth Properties in 2001.

After being purchased by Greenfield and Associates in fall 2004, the mall underwent a $10 million renovation that included a new roof. The mall celebrated its grand opening as Santa Fe Place in November 2005. Babcock & Brown purchased the mall in 2007, followed by Trademark Property in 2010.

Spinoso Real Estate Group owned and managed the property between 2014 and 2023. They made significant renovations and upgrades to the common area during 2014-15 and to the food court in 2019. In 2021, Spinoso Real Estate Group announced plans to develop "Escarpa", a luxury three story apartment complex on the property. The following year, plans to construct a Residence Inn on the northeast side of the property were also announced.

Kohan Retail Investment Group purchased the property in 2023.

== Stores ==
The mall's present anchor stores are JCPenney, Dillard's, Dunham's Sports, and Hobby Lobby.

At the mall's opening, JCPenney moved there from Santa Fe's first mall, De Vargas Center, and Sears moved from its downtown location. Sears closed the store in 2017, and Hobby Lobby relocated its Santa Fe store to the center in 2019, occupying the former Sears space. The original anchor stores also included Bealls, which closed in 1989 to make way for the northern United Artists theater, opened in 1991, and Mervyn's, which closed in 2008 due to bankruptcy. Sports Authority took Mervyn's former location in 2013, but in 2016 it in turn closed due to bankruptcy.

United Artists North closed in 2011, when it was known as the only "discount theater" in Santa Fe. Shoe Pavilion went bankrupt in around 2013, leaving a large vacant location.

In 2016, Victoria's Secret relocated, renovated and added Pink to their location, Torrid and Forever 21 opened new-to-market locations, and Regal Cinemas (formerly United Artists) announced it would reopen a multi-screen theater in the mall after a full renovation of the space. Cost Plus World Market and Bed Bath & Beyond also opened stores in the mall in 2016, and in 2017 H&M replaced the movie theaters.

Conn's HomePlus took over the greater part of the former Mervyn's space in 2022. In October 2022 a new to market 2nd & Charles was announced, to occupy the remainder. However, plans stalled after a change in management. In 2023, Bed Bath & Beyond filed for bankruptcy, resulting in the closure of the Santa Fe location. The following year, Barnes & Noble announced plans for the space. In 2023, Conn's HomePlus filed for bankruptcy and closed and the space was eventually bought in 2025 by Dunham's Sports; the store opened in October 2025.

== Food court ==
Originally the food court at Santa Fe Place was named El Mercado. It hosted 12 restaurants, an arcade, and the United Artists South movie theater. After the change of management and renovation, its name was changed to The Market. The Market can house 6 restaurants, due to Foot Action previously occupying the other half of the court. When renovated, the seating area was leveled. In 2020, Spinoso Real Estate Group remodeled the food court.
