= Santa Fe Trails =

Local transit authority in Santa Fe, New Mexico

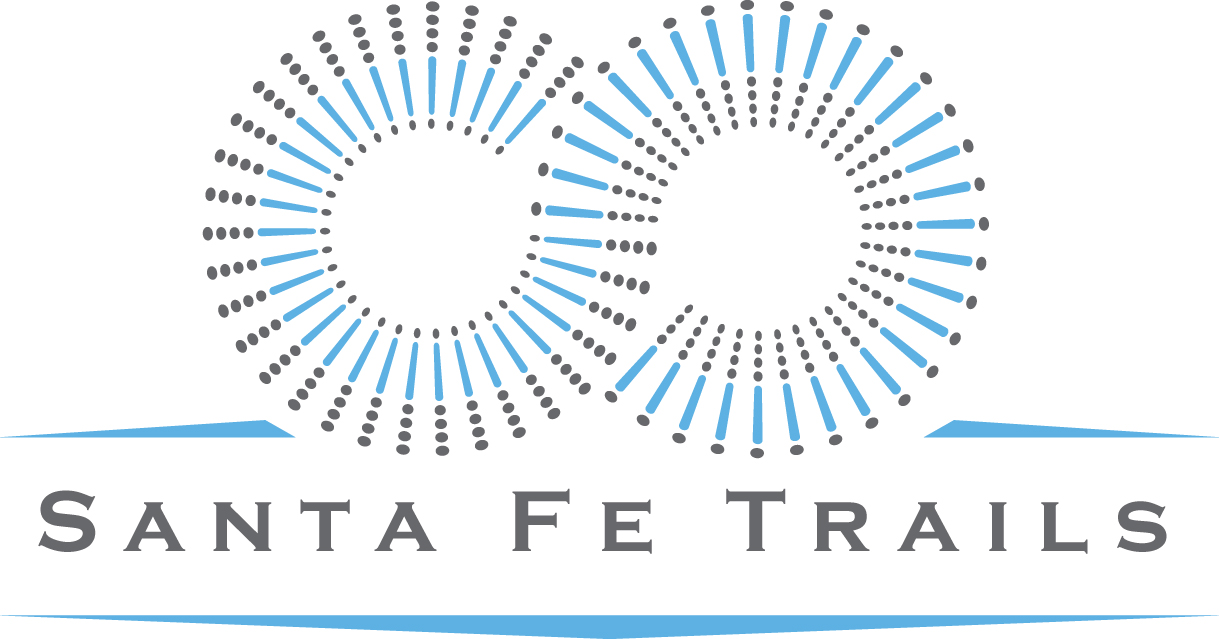

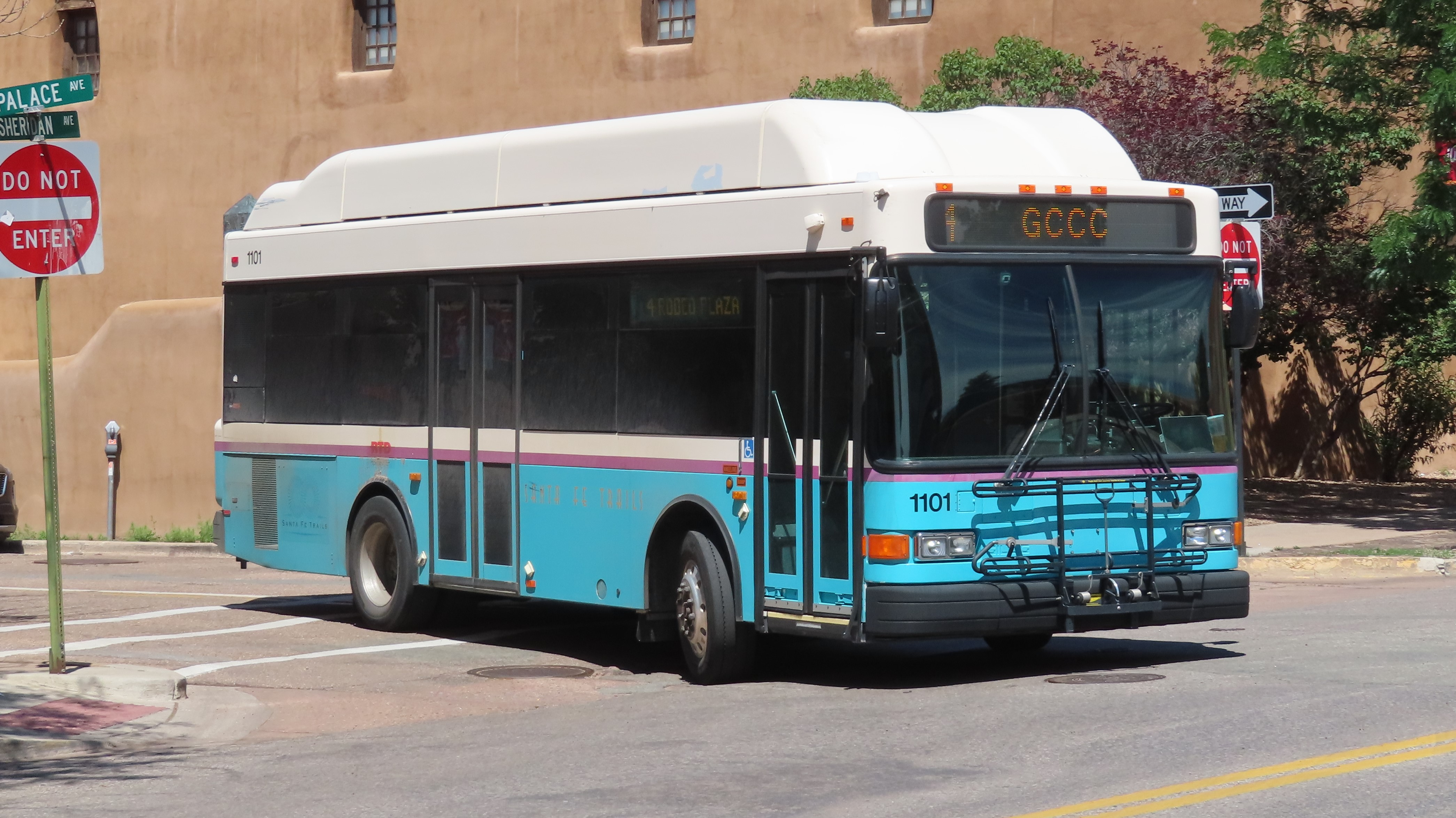
- Santa Fe Trails bus in downtown Santa Fe
- Locale: Santa Fe, New Mexico
- Service type: Public transportation
- Routes: 10
- Hubs: Santa Fe Place Transit Center; Downtown Transit Center
- Fuel type: CNG
- Operator: City of Santa Fe
- Website: www.santafenm.gov/transit

Santa Fe Trails is the local transit agency in Santa Fe, New Mexico. Santa Fe Trails operates ten bus routes which serve most areas of the city. Nearly all of the routes originate at either the Downtown Transit Center one block west of the Plaza, or the Santa Fe Place Transit Center.

In 2024, Santa Fe Trails was participating in a study on the feasibility of driverless vehicle use in public transit systems.

== Routes and schedules ==
- 1 Agua Fria Route Map Weekday Saturday Sunday
- 2 Cerrillos Rd Route Map Weekday Saturday Sunday
- 4 Southside Route Map Weekday Saturday Sunday
- 5 West Alameda/St. Michael's Route Map Weekday Saturday
- 6 Rodeo Rd Route Map Weekday Saturday
- 21 Community College Route Map Weekday
- 22 HSD/Rancho Viejo Route Map Weekday
- 24 Country Club Route Map Weekday Saturday Sunday
- 26 Santa Fe Place, South Cerrillos, and Fashion Outlets Route Map Weekday Saturday Sunday
- M Museum Hill Route Map Weekday Saturday Sunday

== Fares ==
Fare category	Standard Fare	1-Day Pass	31-Day Pass
Adult (18–59)	US$1.00	US$2.00	US$20.00
Senior (60+) and mobility impaired	US$0.50	US$1.00	US$10.00
Youth (0–18 years old)	Free	Free	Free

== Current fleet ==
Numbers	Year	Model	Length	Engine
801-806	2008	ElDorado National E-Z Rider II MAX CNG	30 feet (9.14 m)	Cummins Westport ISL G
807-812	2011	ElDorado National E-Z Rider II MAX CNG	30 feet (9.14 m)	Cummins Westport ISL G
1101	2010	Gillig Low Floor CNG	29 feet (8.84 m)	Cummins Westport ISL G
1102	2011	Gillig Low Floor CNG	29 feet (8.84 m)	Cummins Westport ISL G
1401-1405	2014	Gillig Low Floor CNG	35 feet (10.67 m)	Cummins Westport ISL G
1501-1507	2015	Gillig Low Floor CNG	35 feet (10.67 m)	Cummins Westport ISL G
1901-1904	2019	Gillig Low Floor CNG	29 feet (8.84 m)	Cummins Westport L9N
