= North Central Regional Transit District =

Blue Bus
- wordmark

Overview
- Area served: Northern New Mexico
- Transit type: Local and intercity bus
- Number of lines: 28
- Daily ridership: 500 (weekdays, Q2 2026)
- Annual ridership: 141,900 (2025)
- Headquarters: Española, New Mexico
- Website: ncrtd.org

Operation
- Began operation: 2007
- Operator: North Central Regional Transit District
- Number of vehicles: 54
System map
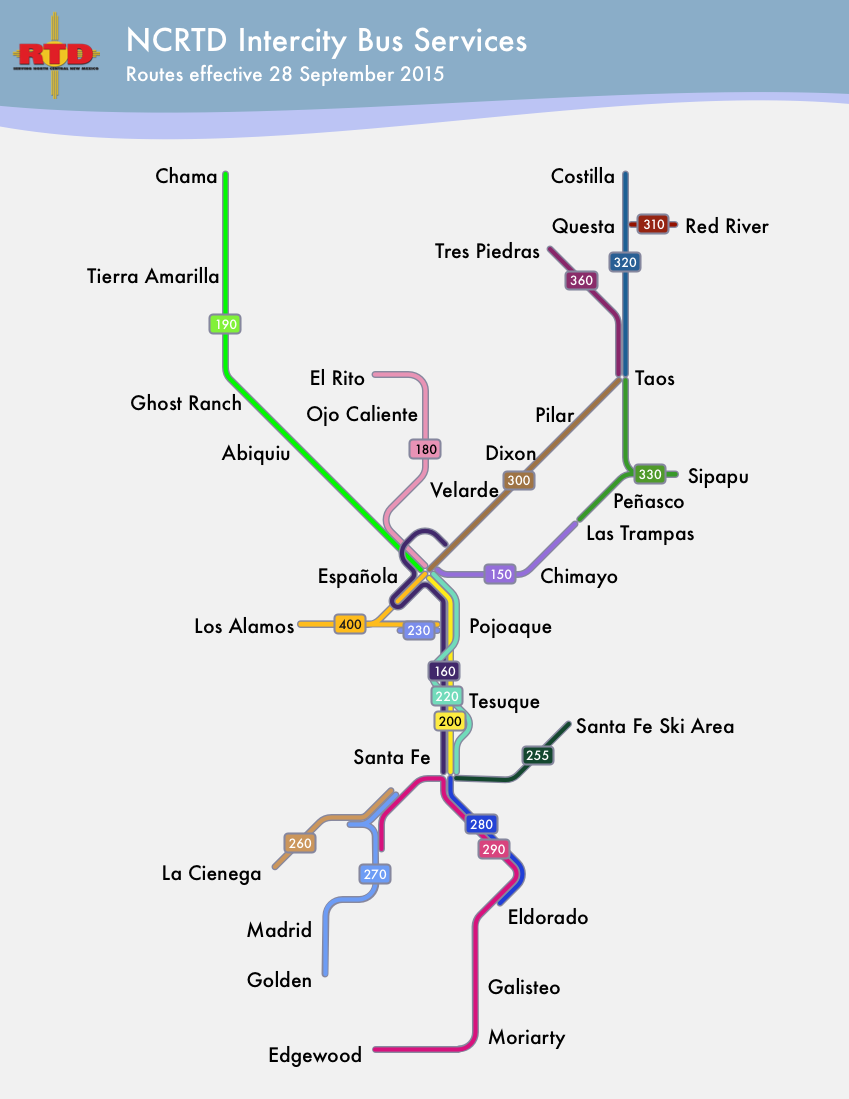

The North Central Regional Transit District operates a network of several local and intercity bus routes in northern New Mexico, serving Santa Fe, Española, Taos, and many smaller communities along a network of 25 fixed routes and one demand-response route, one dial-a-ride and complementary Paratransit service in the Taos area. Routes operate Monday through Friday only, with the exceptions of the "Taos Express," which operates only on weekends, the Mountain Trail route to the Santa Fe National Forest and Ski Santa Fe, which operates 7 days a week, 365 days a year, and seasonal daily service from the Town of Taos to Taos Ski Valley.

All routes are fare-free, with the exception of MyBlue, a rideshare service providing on-demand trips to Española, Pojoaque-Nambé, Taos and Edgewood, New Mexico for a $1 fee. The Blue Bus is supported primarily by transit gross receipt taxes, which provides approximately 70% of revenues. In 2025, the system had a ridership of 141,900, or about 500 per weekday as of the second quarter of 2026.

== History ==
The North Central Regional Transit Blue Bus was created in September 2004 by the New Mexico Transportation Commission under the Regional Transit Act, a law passed by Governor Bill Richardson that authorized the creation of Regional Transit Districts in New Mexico. The RTD first began public transit operations in 2007 after consolidating with local transit services in Rio Arriba County and the City of Española. In the following years, NCRTD expanded service further, aided by a gross receipts tax of one-eighth of one percent that was approved by voters in 2008.

In January 2015, NCRTD took over operations of the weekend Taos Express bus service, and in July took over operations of the local Chile Line bus service in the town of Taos. In September 2015, the RTD opened a new route serving the Santa Fe Ski Area. And in March 2016, the RTD began service along a new route between Santa Fe and La Cienega.

In partnership with the Jicarilla Apache Nation, the District launched the 170 Jicarilla Route in October 2017. The route provides service between Chama, Dulce and Farmington, NM.

Current members of the district include Los Alamos County, Rio Arriba County, Santa Fe County and Taos County, as well as several pueblos, including Ohkay Owingeh, Pojoaque, Nambé, San Ildefonso, Santa Clara and Tesuque.; and the Cities of Española and Santa Fe, the Town of Taos and Edgewood and the Village of Chama. The Rio Metro RTD, based in Albuquerque, sits on the Board as an ex-officio member.

=== Blue Bus Tracker ===
In March 2015, NCRTD launched the Blue Bus Tracker, which allows riders to view bus routes and stops, as well as to view service alerts and expected departure times based on real-time GPS data. Each bus stop on the network is identified by a unique number, which is displayed at the stop; by inputting the number into the Blue Bus Tracker or by texting the number to an automated service number, real-time information can be viewed for that stop.

=== Recognition ===
In October 2014, NCRTD was one of five rural transit agencies nationwide recognized by the Federal Transit Administration with the "Administrator’s Award for Outstanding Public Transportation Service in Rural Public Transportation." NCRTD was also honored by the New Mexico Department of Transportation as the "2014 Section 5311 Rural Transit System of the Year," and was honored in both 2009 and 2012 as the "Job Access and Reverse Commute Transportation System of the Year."

=== Expansion ===
In partnership with the Jicarilla Apache Nation, the District launched the 170 Jicarilla Route in October 2017. The route provides service between Chama and Dulce Monday, Wednesday and Friday, and Chama, Dulce and Farmington, NM Tuesday and Thursday. On 28 September 2015, the new Mountain Trail route opened, providing service between the city of Santa Fe and the Santa Fe Ski Area with multiple stops at trailheads and various locations in the Santa Fe National Forest.

== List of routes ==
- 100 Riverside: Riverside Drive, Española
- 110 Westside-Crosstown: Fairview Lane, Española
- 150 Chimayo: Las Trampas – Chimayo – Española
- 160 Santa Clara: Santa Fe/Ohkay Owingeh – Española – Santa Clara Pueblo
- 170 Jicarilla: Service between Chama, Dulce and Farmington, and the Jicarilla Apache Nation
- 180 El Rito: El Rito – Ojo Caliente – Española
- 190 Chama: Chama – Española via U.S. Route 84
- 200 Santa Fe: Española-Pojoaque – Santa Fe
- 210 Pojoaque-Nambé: Dial-A-Ride
- 220 Tesuque: Española-Tesuque – Santa Fe
- 230 San Ildefonso: San Ildefonso Pueblo – Pojoaque
- 255 Mountain Trail: Santa Fe – Santa Fe Ski Area
- 260 La Cienega: La Cienega – Santa Fe
- 270 Turquoise Trail: Santa Fe – Madrid – Golden via New Mexico State Road 14
- 280 Eldorado: Edgewood – Eldorado – Santa Fe
- 290 Edgewood: Edgewood – Eldorado – Santa Fe
- 300 Taos: Taos – Española via New Mexico State Road 68
- 305 Taos Express:Weekend express service between Taos, Española and Santa Fe
- 310 Red River: Red River – Questa
- 320 Questa: Taos – Questa – Costilla via New Mexico State Road 522
- 330 Peñasco: Taos – Peñasco – Las Trampas
- 340 Chile Line Red: Town of Taos
- 341 TSV Green: Town of Taos to Taos Ski Valley
- 360 Tres Piedras: Taos – Tres Piedras via the Rio Grande Gorge Bridge
- 400 Los Alamos: Los Alamos – Española/Pojoaque

== Other RTD funded services ==
The North Central RTD also funds two local bus networks in the area. In Santa Fe, the RTD provides funding to Santa Fe Trails, which provides service on ten fixed routes, two downtown circulator routes (the Santa Fe Pickup) and a paratransit service that provides demand-response transportation for elderly and disabled persons (the Santa Fe Ride). In Los Alamos and White Rock, the RTD also provides funding to Atomic City Transit, which provides service on seven fixed routes, five school bus routes, and a Dial-A-Ride system. The RTD also provides funding to the New Mexico Rail Runner Express which offers rail service between the cities of Albuquerque and Santa Fe.
