= Lamy, New Mexico =

Place in Santa Fe County, New Mexico, US

- CDP
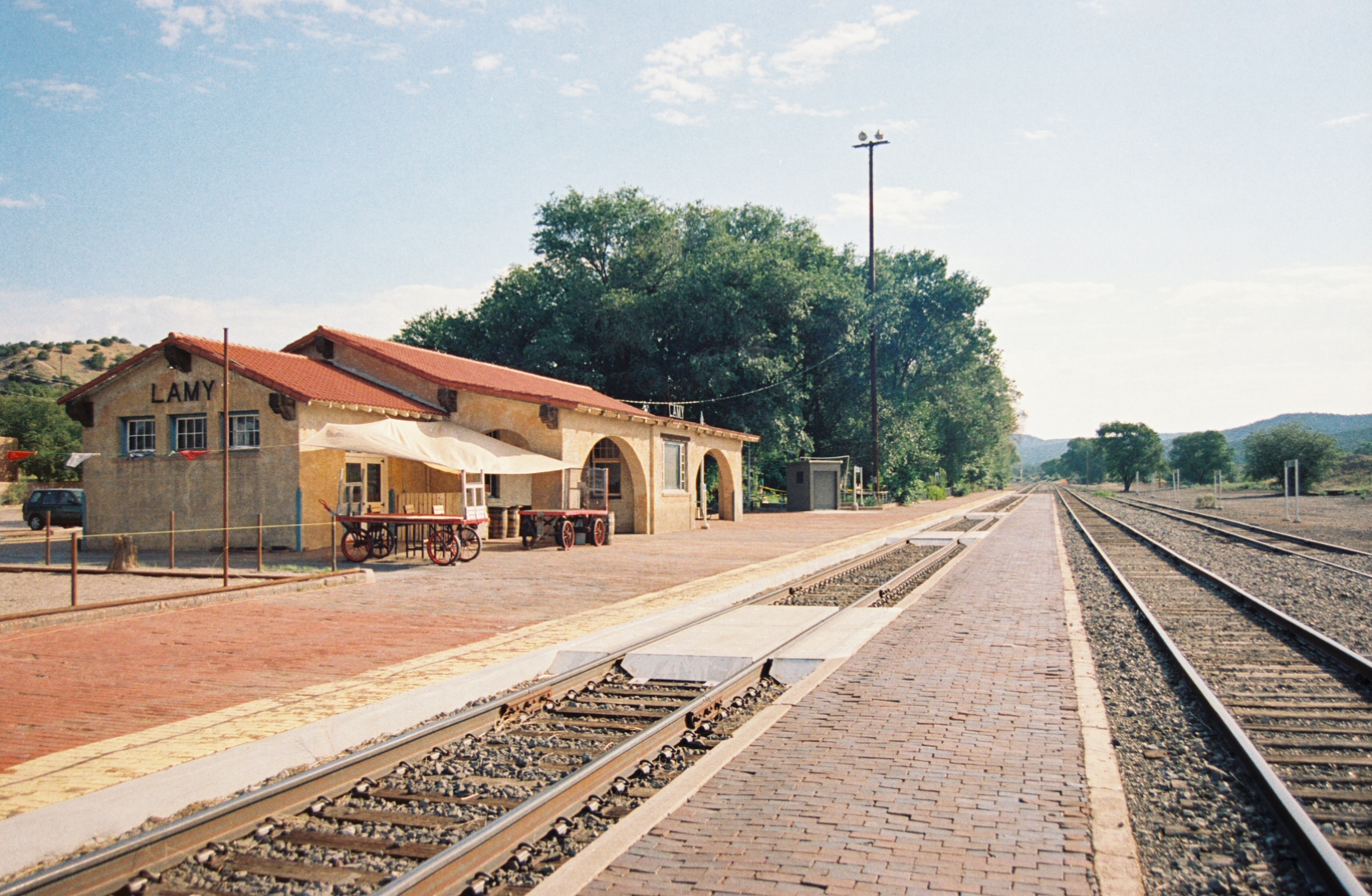
- Train station in Lamy

- Location of Lamy, New Mexico
- Coordinates: 35°29′41″N 105°52′15″W
- Country: United States
- State: New Mexico
- County: Santa Fe

Area
  - Total: 2.59 sq mi (6.71 km^{2})
  - Land: 2.59 sq mi (6.71 km^{2})
  - Water: 0 sq mi (0.00 km^{2})
- Elevation: 6,569 ft (2,002 m)

Population (2020)
  - Total: 210
  - Density: 81/sq mi (31.3/km^{2})
- Time zone: UTC-7 (Mountain (MST))
  - Summer (DST): UTC-6 (MDT)
- ZIP code: 87540
- Area code: 505
- FIPS code: 35-38890
- GNIS feature ID: 2408569

Lamy (/ˈleɪmi/ LAY-mee) is a census-designated place (CDP) in Santa Fe County, New Mexico, United States. As of the 2020 census, Lamy had a population of 210. It is located approximately 18 miles (29 km) south of the city of Santa Fe.

== Name ==
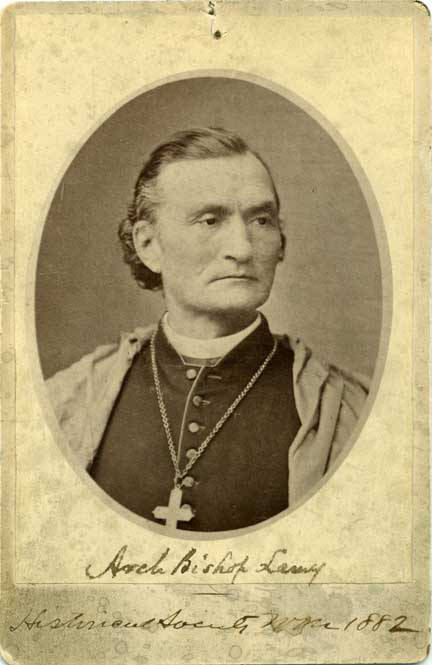
Archbishop Lamy in 1882

The community was named for Archbishop Jean-Baptiste Lamy, and lies within the Bishop John Lamy Spanish Land Grant. The area was included in a grant dating back to the eighteenth century. It had previously been known as Galisteo Junction because it contained the closest railway stop at the time to Galisteo, New Mexico, but the similarity in names of the two towns led to confusion in the delivery of postal mail. Jean-Baptiste Lamy's influence over this area includes his creation of Santa Fe's first English teaching school, as well as establishing other similar institutions.

== History ==
=== Pre-Columbian ===
The Lamy Junction Community is an archaeological site of fourteen Coalition Era (AD 1200–1325) pueblos and other structures, located near the junction of US Highway 285 and Santa Fe County Road 233.

=== Modern ===
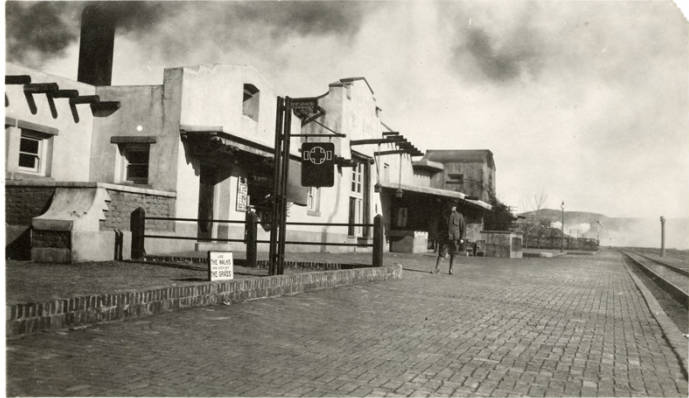
The El Ortiz Hotel in 1920

The former Atchison, Topeka, and Santa Fe Railroad was originally planned to run from Atchison, Kansas to Santa Fe, the capital city of New Mexico Territory, and then onward to points west. The first train arrived in the city on February 9, 1880. However, the railroad's surveyors had already realized that the hills surrounding Santa Fe made a continuation through and beyond the city impractical, and created a rail junction where the tracks diverged abruptly north toward that city, while the main line continued west and south toward Albuquerque. The site was originally named Galisteo Junction but later changed to Lamy.

In 1896 the Fred Harvey Company built the luxurious El Ortiz Hotel here, designed by Louis Curtiss. The El Ortiz was demolished after its closing in 1947.

== Geography ==
According to the United States Census Bureau, the CDP has a total area of 1.1 square miles (2.8 km^{2}), all land.

== Demographics ==
Historical population
Census	Pop.	Note	%±
2000	137		—
2010	218		59.1%
2020	210		−3.7%
U.S. Decennial Census

Lamy is part of the Santa Fe, New Mexico, Metropolitan Statistical Area.

As of the census of 2000, there were 137 people, 55 households, and 33 families residing in the CDP. The population density was 126.2 inhabitants per square mile (48.7/km^{2}). There were 64 housing units at an average density of 59.0 per square mile (22.8/km^{2}). The racial makeup of the CDP was 74.45% White, 2.92% Native American, 18.25% from other races, and 4.38% from two or more races. Hispanic or Latino of any race were 44.53% of the population.

There were 55 households, out of which 40.0% had children under the age of 18 living with them, 49.1% were married couples living together, 10.9% had a female householder with no husband present, and 38.2% were non-families. 29.1% of all households were made up of individuals, and 9.1% had someone living alone who was 65 years of age or older. The average household size was 2.49 and the average family size was 3.18.

In the CDP, the population was spread out, with 27.7% under the age of 18, 10.2% from 18 to 24, 26.3% from 25 to 44, 28.5% from 45 to 64, and 7.3% who were 65 years of age or older. The median age was 34 years. For every 100 females, there were 95.7 males. For every 100 females age 18 and over, there were 98.0 males.

The median income for a household in the CDP was $43,333, and the median income for a family was $27,083. Males had a median income of $25,568 versus $0 for females. The per capita income for the CDP was $16,765. There were 17.5% of families and 20.5% of the population living below the poverty line, including no under eighteens and none of those over 64.

== Education ==
It is within Santa Fe Public Schools.

It is zoned to El Dorado Community School (K-8) in El Dorado. Its high school is Santa Fe High School.

A former schoolhouse in Lamy has been converted to a private home, after previously serving as a meeting location for the Bioneers.

== Infrastructure ==
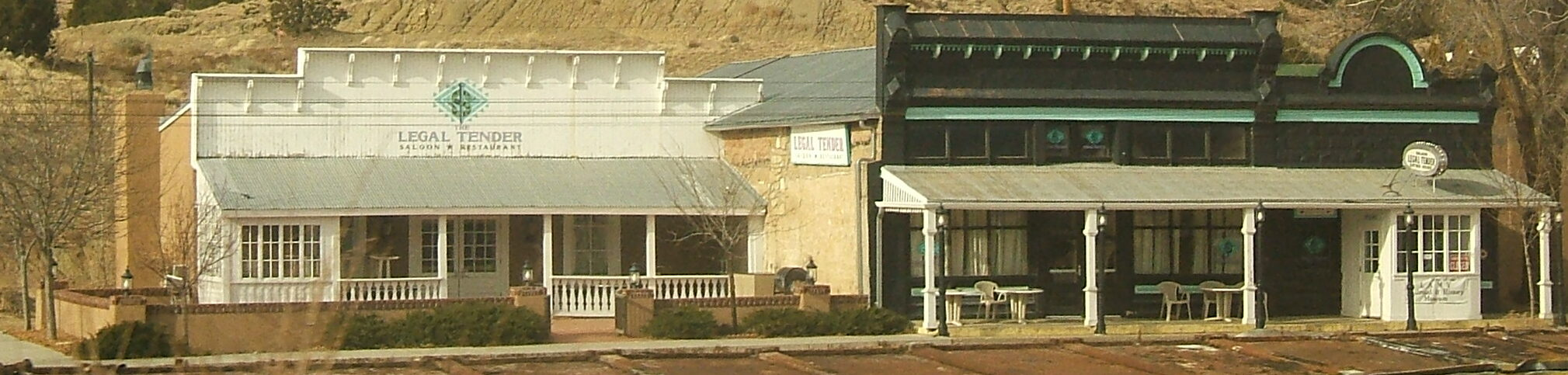
The Pflueger building in 2007

=== Rail ===
The former Atchison, Topeka, and Santa Fe Railroad (ATSF), now the Burlington Northern Santa Fe (BNSF), passes through Lamy. Little freight traffic now passes over the line, but it remains the route of the Amtrak Southwest Chief, with one train daily in each direction stopping at Lamy Station.

The significance of Lamy as a railroad junction is related in the Oscar-nominated documentary, The Day After Trinity (1980), about the building of the first atomic bomb, and is referred to by the instrumental group the California Guitar Trio in a five-part suite Train to Lamy on their second album Invitation (1995).

==== Santa Fe spur line ====
From 1992 to 2014, the spur line was taken over by the Santa Fe Southern Railway, which operated a popular excursion train, using vintage passenger railcars and modern freight cars, between Santa Fe and Lamy.

In 2020, several prominent Santa Fe residents, including novelist George R.R. Martin, created Sky Railway, an excursion train that runs on Santa Fe Southern Railway's route between Lamy and Santa Fe, although the excursions themselves do not run all the way to Lamy. Sky Railway began operations in December, 2021.

=== Roads ===
The community is served by Santa Fe County Road 33, a short, dead-road connecting to US Highway 285.

=== Museum ===
The Lamy Railroad and History Museum, located in the historic "Legal Tender" restaurant building, is dedicated to preserving local history and heritage, with emphasis on the railroads and their impact on the area. The museum buildings, formerly the Pflueger General Merchandise Store (built in 1881) and the attached Annex Saloon (built in 1884), are listed on the National Register of Historic Places. The Legal Tender Saloon and Restaurant re-opened as the Legal Tender at The Lamy Railroad & History Museum in March 2012, after 14 years. The restaurant and museum are run as a non-profit and the waitstaff are volunteers. It is open Thursday through Sunday.

== Notable people ==
- Eliza Gilkyson, singer, resided in Lamy, as described by her song The Hill Behind This Town on the album Songs from the River Wind
- Thom Ross, artist, resides in Lamy
- James Thomas Stevens, poet, resided in Lamy
