= Pleasure Dome (railcar) =

Railroad car on the Santa Fe Railway

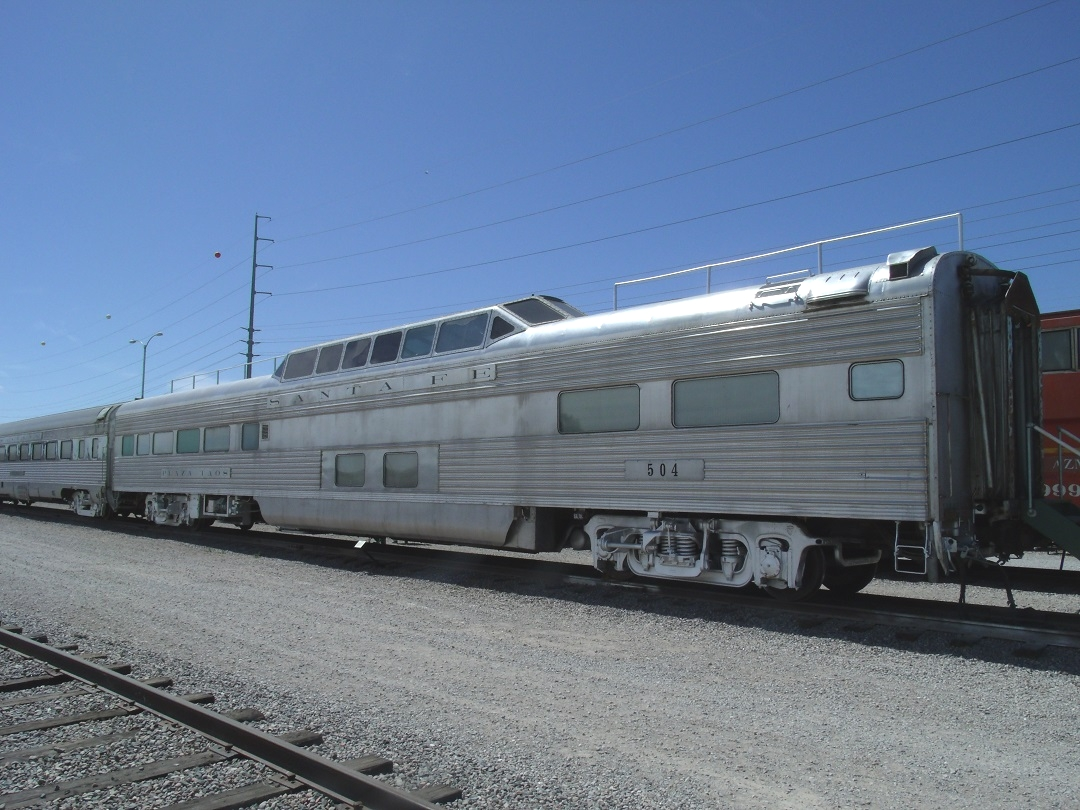
- ATSF #504

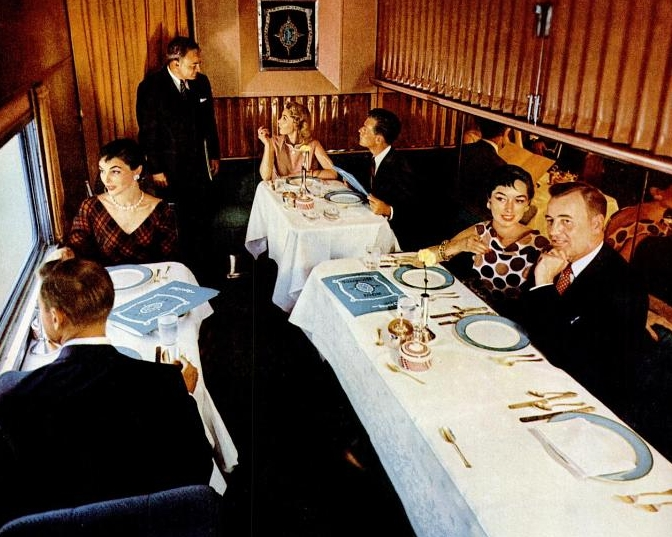
- The "Turquoise Room" private dining room in the Pleasure Dome.
- In service: 1951–1980
- Manufacturer: Pullman-Standard
- Number built: 6
- Number preserved: 6
- Fleet numbers: 500-505 (ATSF); 9350-9555 (Amtrak)
- Operators: ATSF (1951-1971); Amtrak (1971-1980)

The Pleasure Domes are a fleet of six streamlined dome lounge cars built by Pullman-Standard for the Atchison, Topeka and Santa Fe Railway ("Santa Fe") in 1950. The cars were used exclusively on the Super Chief from their introduction in 1950 until the end of Santa Fe passenger service in 1971. Amtrak retained all six cars and continued to operate them until 1980 when they were retired. All six were preserved. The Pleasure Dome, with its famed "Turquoise Room" private dining room, contributed to the Super Chiefs reputation for elegance and luxury.

== Design ==
The Pleasure Domes were lounge-dining cars, but with some unusual variations. Most dome lounges had two areas: the dome seating area above, and the lounge area below. The Pleasure Domes added a third area: a private dining room named the "Turquoise Room" which was available by reservation only and could seat 12. Newspaper reports of the 1950s noted that these cars constituted "the first private dining room on wheels." The dome seating area featured parlor car-style swivel chairs. Meals in the Turquoise Room were prepared in an adjoining dining car. The Santa Fe named them "Pleasure Domes" from a line in Samuel Taylor Coleridge's poem Kubla Khan:

In Xanadu did Kubla Khan
A stately pleasure-dome decree:
Where Alph, the sacred river, ran
Through caverns measureless to man
Down to a sunless sea.

— Samuel Taylor Coleridge, Kubla Kahn

== History ==
The Pleasure Domes were the first dome cars the Santa Fe owned and operated when they entered service on the Super Chief in 1950. In June 1952, Warner Bros. Pictures released Three for Bedroom "C", a romantic comedy starring Gloria Swanson, James Warren, Fred Clark, Hans Conried, and Steve Brodie. In the film, an aging movie star (Swanson) hides out in a compartment during a cross-country journey from New York to Los Angeles aboard the Super Chief. For this picture the Santa Fe provided actual railroad cars, including a Pleasure Dome, which were temporarily disassembled on the Republic Pictures backlot.

Amtrak retained the Super Chief almost unchanged after it took over operations in May 1971, including the Pleasure Domes. However, Amtrak could not hope to keep service at the levels previously maintained by the Santa Fe, and relations between the two companies deteriorated. It was Amtrak's decision in early 1974 to remove the Pleasure Domes and first class-only dining car (a decision it later reversed) from the Super Chief which provoked the Santa Fe to rescind permission for Amtrak's use of the trademarked name and the train became the Southwest Limited until 1984 when, with the new Superliner equipment, the railroad rescinded its opposition and train was renamed the Southwest Chief. Amtrak retired the domes from the route in the late 1970s and sold all six domes to private operators in the early 1980s.

== Legacy ==
The Pleasure Domes remain part of the Super Chief's legacy of premium rail service. At the former Santa Fe station in Winslow, Arizona (still served by Amtrak), the "Turquoise Room" restaurant at the La Posada Hotel carries on the tradition of elegant dining, albeit in a stationary fashion. By June 2016, the La Posada's owner had acquired one of the Pleasure Domes, which has been moved to the property.

== See also ==
- Dome car
