= Sandoval County/US 550 station =

Sandoval County US 550
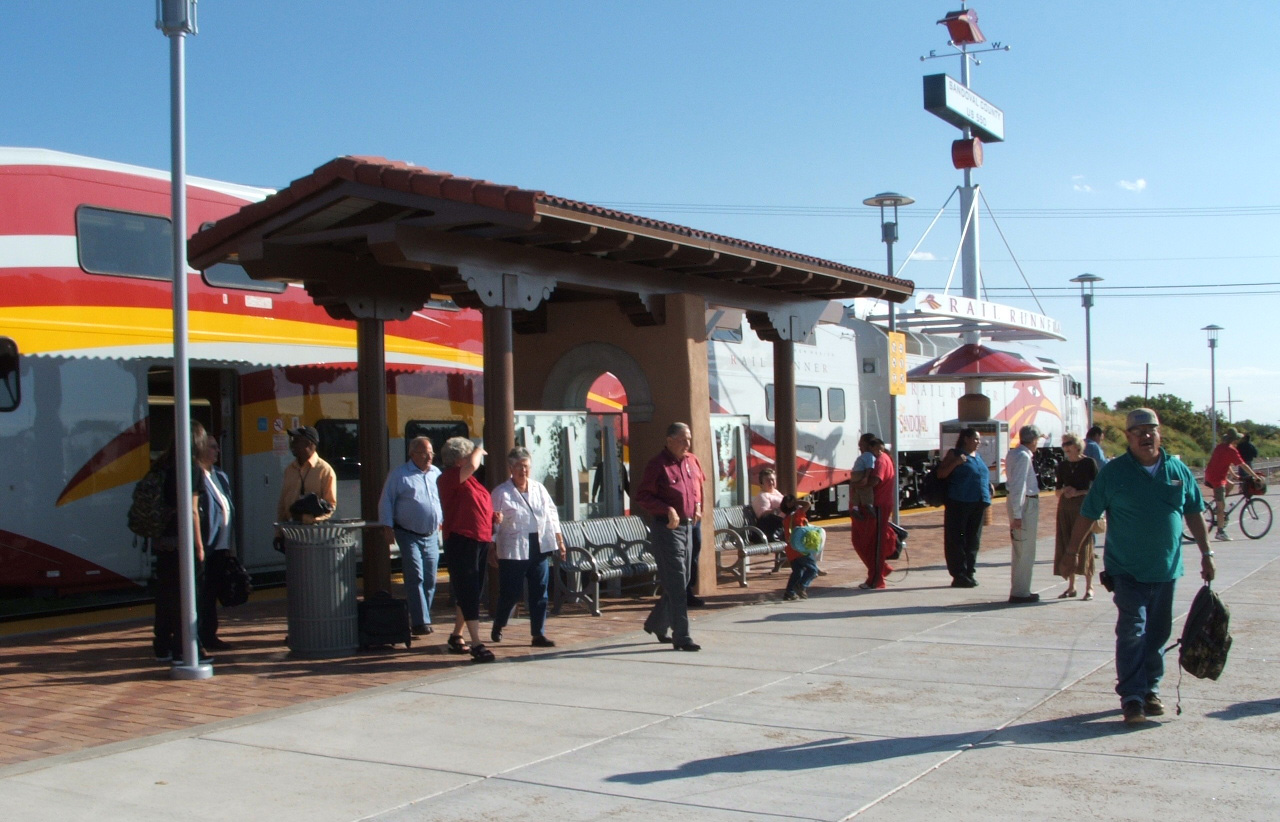

General information
- Location: 400 Station Street, Bernalillo, New Mexico 87004
- Coordinates: 35°18′57″N 106°32′19″W
- Platforms: 1 side platform
- Tracks: 1
- Connections: SEE, Santa Ana Star Casino Shuttle

Construction
- Parking: 191 spaces
- Accessible: yes

Other information
- Fare zone: Zone C

History
- Opened: July 14, 2006

Services
Preceding station	New Mexico Rail Runner Express	Following station
Downtown Bernalillo toward Belen	Rail Runner Express	Kewa toward Santa Fe Depot
Location

Sandoval County/US 550 is a station on the New Mexico Rail Runner Express commuter rail line, located in Bernalillo, New Mexico, United States.

It is located on the south side of U.S. Route 550 just west of the I-25 interchange, at the north end of Bernalillo. It serves residents of southeastern Sandoval County, including Bernalillo and Rio Rancho. The station opened on July 14, 2006 as one of the three original stations on the line along with Los Ranchos/Journal Center and Downtown Albuquerque.

There is a park and ride lot located on the hill above the station, which is connected to the platform by a pedestrian bridge. The station has free parking, with 191 spaces. The Sandoval Easy Express shuttle service serves the station, as well as a shuttle to the nearby Santa Ana Star Casino.

Each of the Rail Runner stations contains an icon to express each community's identity. The icon representing this station is the wine grape, representing the numerous vineyards and wine makers in the area.

== Platform ==
Sandoval County/US 550 Station opened with a platform built long enough to accommodate three cars. Within a year of service, the Rail Runner was running five-car trains during peak periods. This prompted MRCOG to expand the platforms at Los Ranchos & Sandoval/US 550 Stations to accommodate 4 cars in 2009. The last car (Closest to the engine) is usually filled with passengers destined for the Santa Fe South Capitol and Depot stations.

== Gallery ==
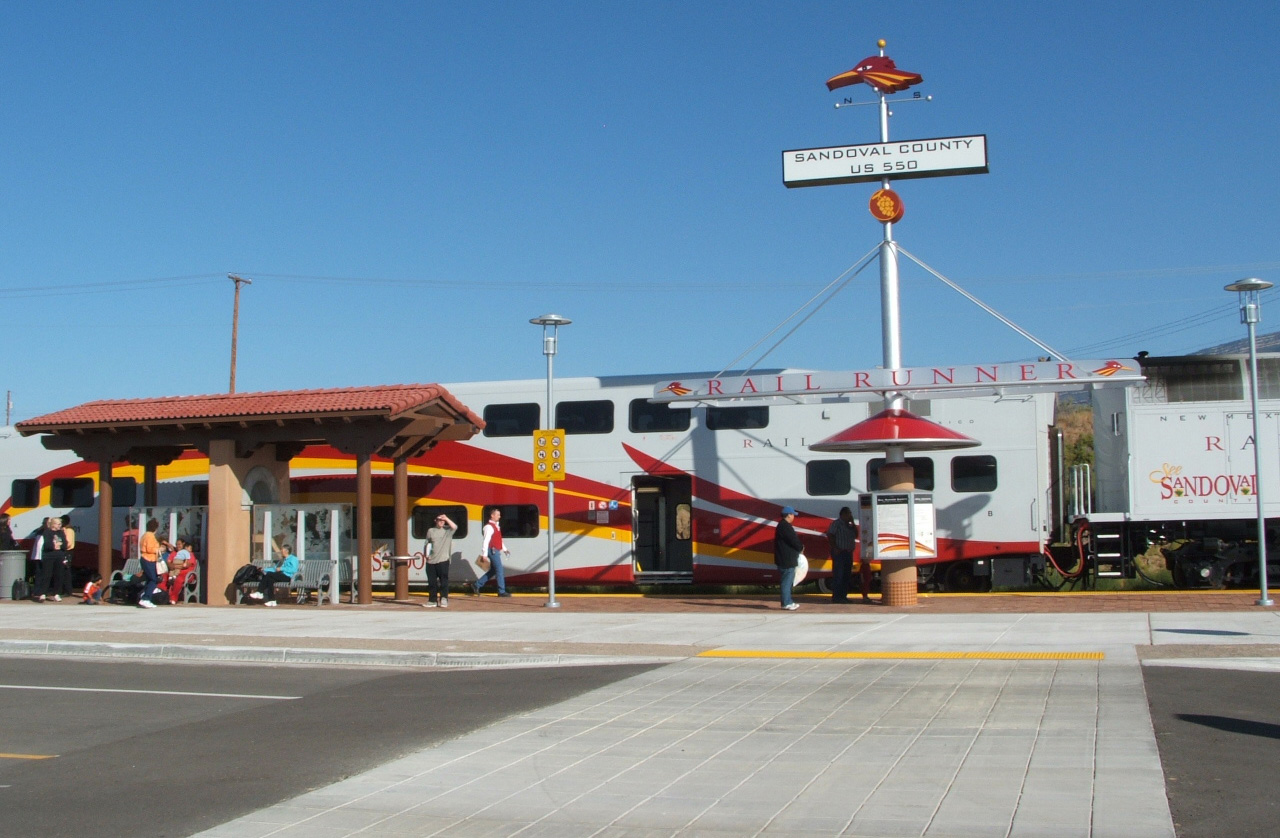
Sandoval County/US 550
