= Los Ranchos/Journal Center station =

Los Ranchos/Journal Center
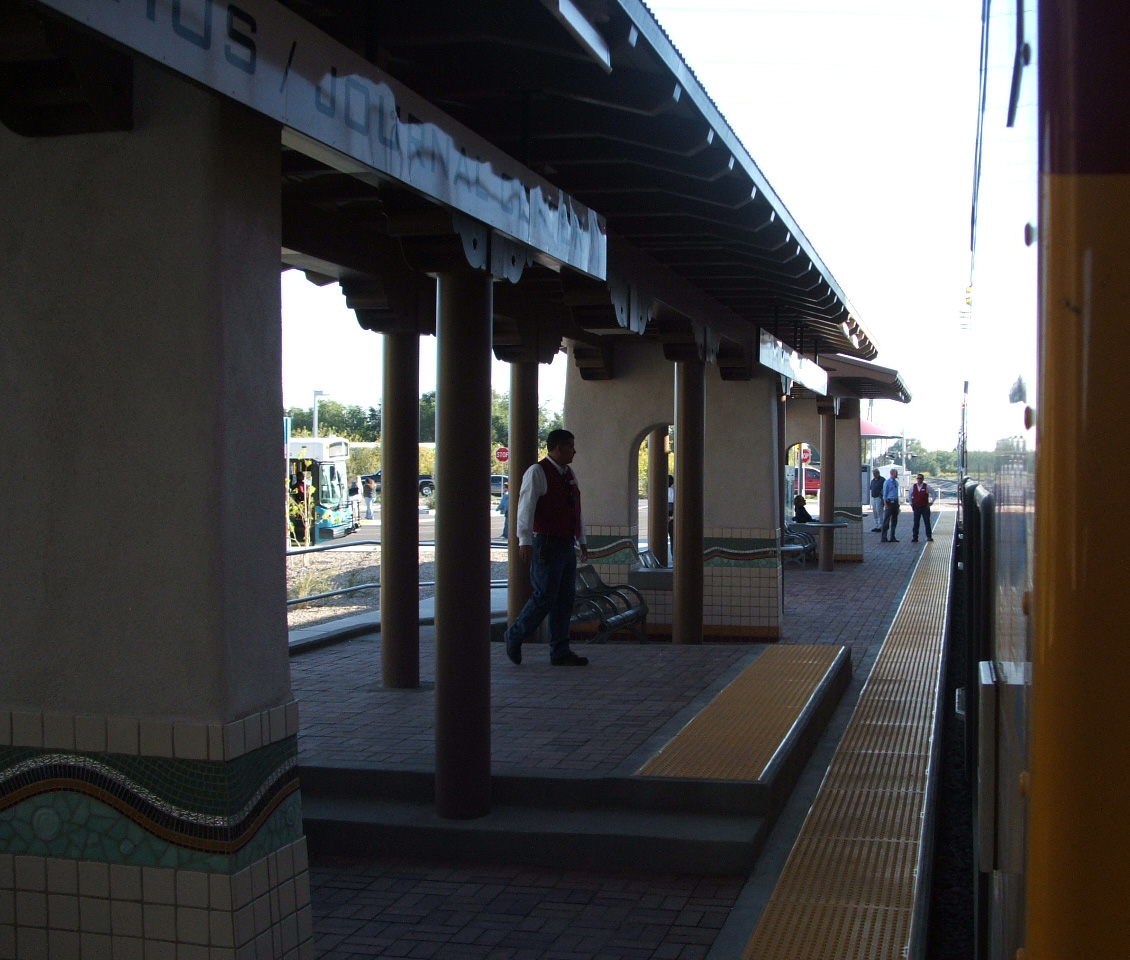

General information
- Location: 101 El Pueblo Road; North Valley, NM
- Coordinates: 35°10′34″N 106°37′2″W
- Platforms: 1 side platform
- Tracks: 1
- Connections: ABQRide

Construction
- Parking: 270 spaces
- Accessible: yes

Other information
- Fare zone: Zone B

History
- Opened: July 14, 2006

Services
Preceding station	New Mexico Rail Runner Express	Following station
Montaño toward Belen	Rail Runner Express	Sandia Pueblo toward Santa Fe Depot
Location

Los Ranchos/Journal Center is a station on the New Mexico Rail Runner Express commuter rail line, located in North Valley, New Mexico.

It is located just south of Paseo del Norte between Second and Edith. It serves residents of Los Ranchos de Albuquerque and the North Valley. The station opened on July 14, 2006 as one of the three original stations on the line along with Sandoval County/US 550 and Downtown Albuquerque.

Passengers can transfer to ABQRide Route 251, which serves the Jefferson corridor and Rio Rancho. The station has free parking, with 270 spaces. The station is also served by the Park and Ride Purple route.

Each of the Rail Runner stations contains an icon to express each community's identity. The icon representing this station is a horse, representing the importance of horse travel and farming in the region.

== Platform ==
Los Ranchos/Journal Center Station opened with a platform built long enough to accommodate three cars. Within a year of service, the Rail Runner was running five-car trains during peak periods. This prompted MRCOG to expand the platforms at Los Ranchos & Sandoval/US 550 Stations to accommodate four cars in 2009. The last car (Closest to the engine) is usually filled with commuters destined for the Santa Fe South Capitol and Depot stations.

== Parking ==
The original station opened in 2006 with 140 parking spots. Within the first year of service, parking was full, and commuters resorted to parking along the sides of the main road as well as alongside the railroad tracks. In response to the need of more parking, MRCOG leased an acre of land from a local landscaping business to create 130 more parking spots in August 2009. This has nearly doubled the amount of parking and has satisfied local homeowners and businesses.

== Notes ==
The Rail Runner was featured on MythBusters solving a popular myth that the vortex of wind a train creates can pick up a person standing close to the tracks. The Mythbusters tested and performed their myth at this station. The episode debuted on November 8, 2006.
