= Lobo Special Events Platform =

Former rail station in New Mexico, United States

Lobo
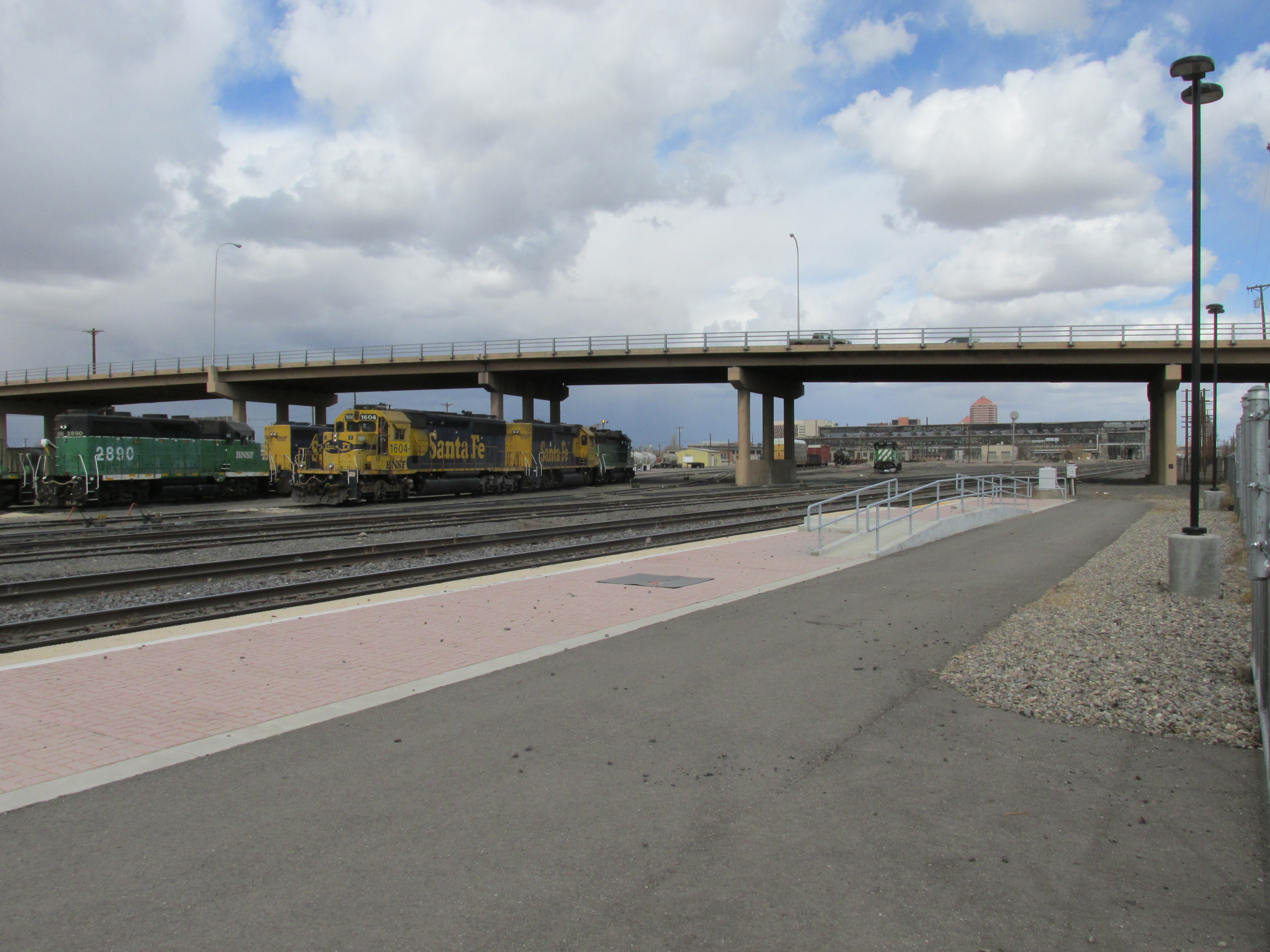
- Lobo Special Events Platform

General information
- Location: 1425 Commercial Street SE; Albuquerque, New Mexico 87102
- Coordinates: 35°4′8″N 106°38′59″W
- System: Former Rail Runner Express commuter rail station
- Line: Rail Runner Express
- Platforms: 1 side platform
- Tracks: 1

Construction
- Accessible: yes

Other information
- Fare zone: Zone B

History
- Opened: September 12, 2009
- Closed: December 2009

Passengers
- 227 (cumulative lifetime total passenger count)

Services
Preceding station	New Mexico Rail Runner Express	Following station
Bernalillo County toward Belen	Rail Runner Express	Downtown Albuquerque toward Santa Fe Depot
Location

The Lobo Special Events Platform is an inactive limited use platform on the New Mexico Rail Runner Express commuter rail line in Albuquerque, New Mexico, United States. MRCOG created the station in 2009 at a cost of $1 million (equivalent to $1.5 million in 2025), split between MRCOG and the University of New Mexico. It was created as an incentive for residents of the region to use alternative transportation to attend University of New Mexico sports games as well as games of the Albuquerque Isotopes minor baseball team at Isotopes Park.

The station was last used in 2009 and only ever opened during four sporting events, when it serviced a cumulative total of 227 passengers. Bus shuttles provided service from the platform to the stadiums.

Each Rail Runner station contains an icon to express each community's identity. The icons representing this station are a Lobo, using the sports mascot from the University of New Mexico Athletic Department, and the logo for the Albuquerque Isotopes.

The last time the Rail Runner stopped at the station was in December 2009, for the New Mexico Bowl. Afterwards, the station became inactive, and the Rail Runner website no longer acknowledges the platform on its website or any of its materials. MRCOG cited the costs associated with chartering buses and low ridership interest as reasons for not using the platform. Neither MRCOG, Rio Metro, or UNM have held any discussions regarding the future use of the station.

== Passengers ==
The station was used by 60 passengers for a Fall 2009 Tulsa-New Mexico football game. The next month, 91 passengers used it for a UNLV-New Mexico game. In November 2009, 49 passengers used the station for a BYU game. 27 passengers used the station it was last ever used, in December 2009, for a Fresno State-Wyoming game.

In total, 227 passengers ever used the Lobo Special Events Platform before it was retired from service.
