= Isleta Pueblo station =

Isleta Pueblo
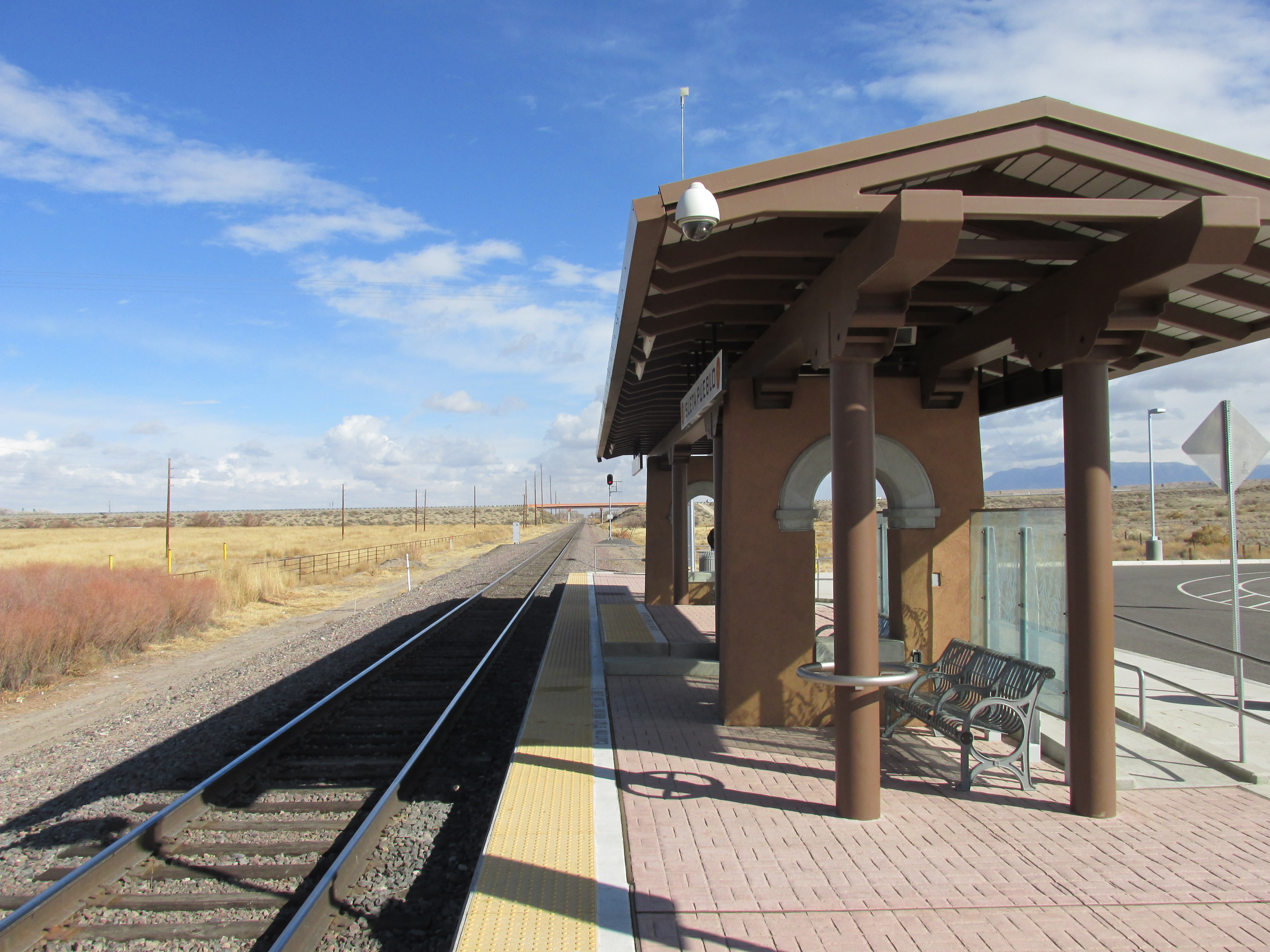
- Isleta Pueblo station in February 2013

General information
- Location: 75 Isleta Lakes Road; Isleta Pueblo, New Mexico
- Coordinates: 34°56′48.1″N 106°40′23.6″W
- Platforms: 1 side platform
- Tracks: 1

Construction
- Parking: 75 spaces
- Accessible: yes

Other information
- Fare zone: Zone B

History
- Opened: December 17, 2008

Services
Preceding station	New Mexico Rail Runner Express	Following station
Los Lunas toward Belen	Rail Runner Express	Bernalillo County toward Santa Fe Depot
Location

Isleta Pueblo station is a commuter rail station on the New Mexico Rail Runner Express line located in Isleta Pueblo, New Mexico. The station is located off Isleta Lakes Road (Tribal Road 15) about 1/2 mile (0.8 km) west of New Mexico State Road 47. It opened with the line on December 17, 2008.
