= Los Lunas station =

Railway station in Los Lunas, New Mexico

Los Lunas
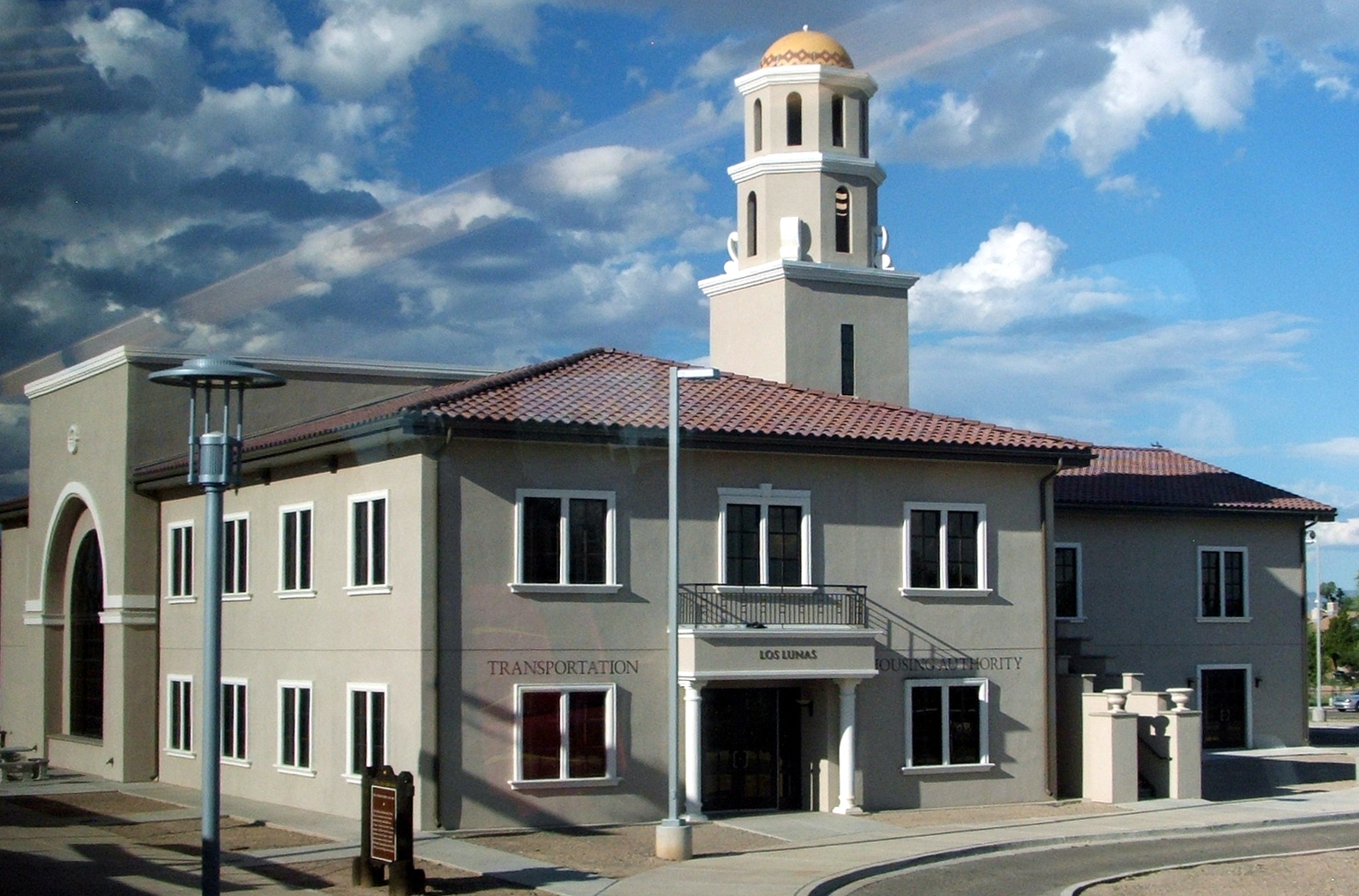

General information
- Location: 101 Courthouse Road; Los Lunas, New Mexico 87031
- Coordinates: 34°47′58″N 106°44′14″W
- Platforms: 1 side platform
- Tracks: 1

Construction
- Parking: 190 spaces
- Accessible: yes

Other information
- Fare zone: Zone A

History
- Opened: December 11, 2006

Services
Preceding station	New Mexico Rail Runner Express	Following station
Belen Terminus	Rail Runner Express	Isleta Pueblo toward Santa Fe Depot
Location

Los Lunas is a station on the New Mexico Rail Runner Express commuter rail line, located in Los Lunas, New Mexico, at the intersection of Highway 314 and Courthouse Road. The station began service on December 11, 2006 as the fourth station on the line. Los Lunas Public Transportation has shuttles serving the station. Each of the Rail Runner stations contains an icon to express each community's identity. The icon representing this station is the old Los Lunas train station.

The station has free parking, with 190 spaces, with congestion at the parking lot requiring that an extension be built less than a year after the station originally opened. This extension was opened on April 30, 2007. The mayor of the town admitted that more parking was needed although the extension had recently been built; the next phase of expansion involves building 120 new spaces.

== Gallery ==
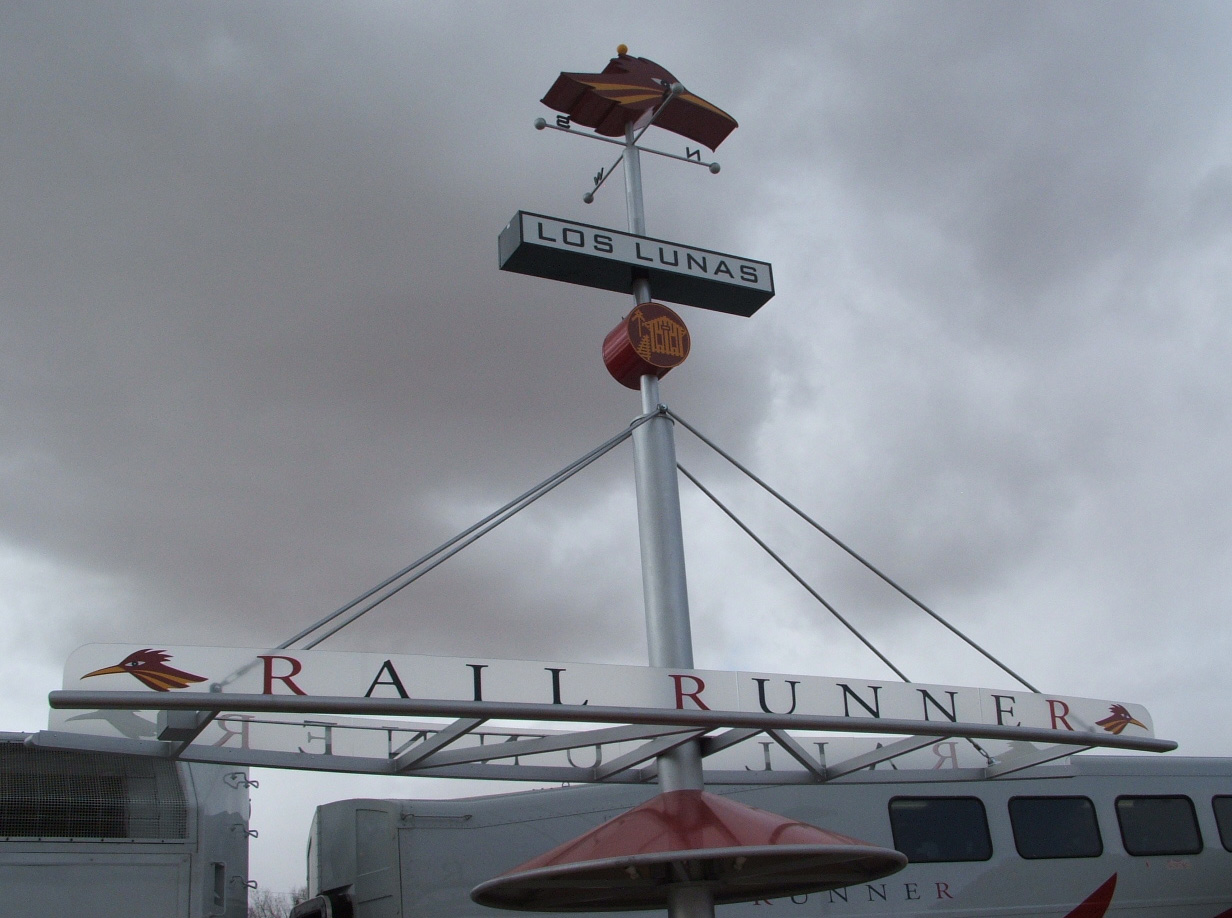
The icon for Los Lunas station

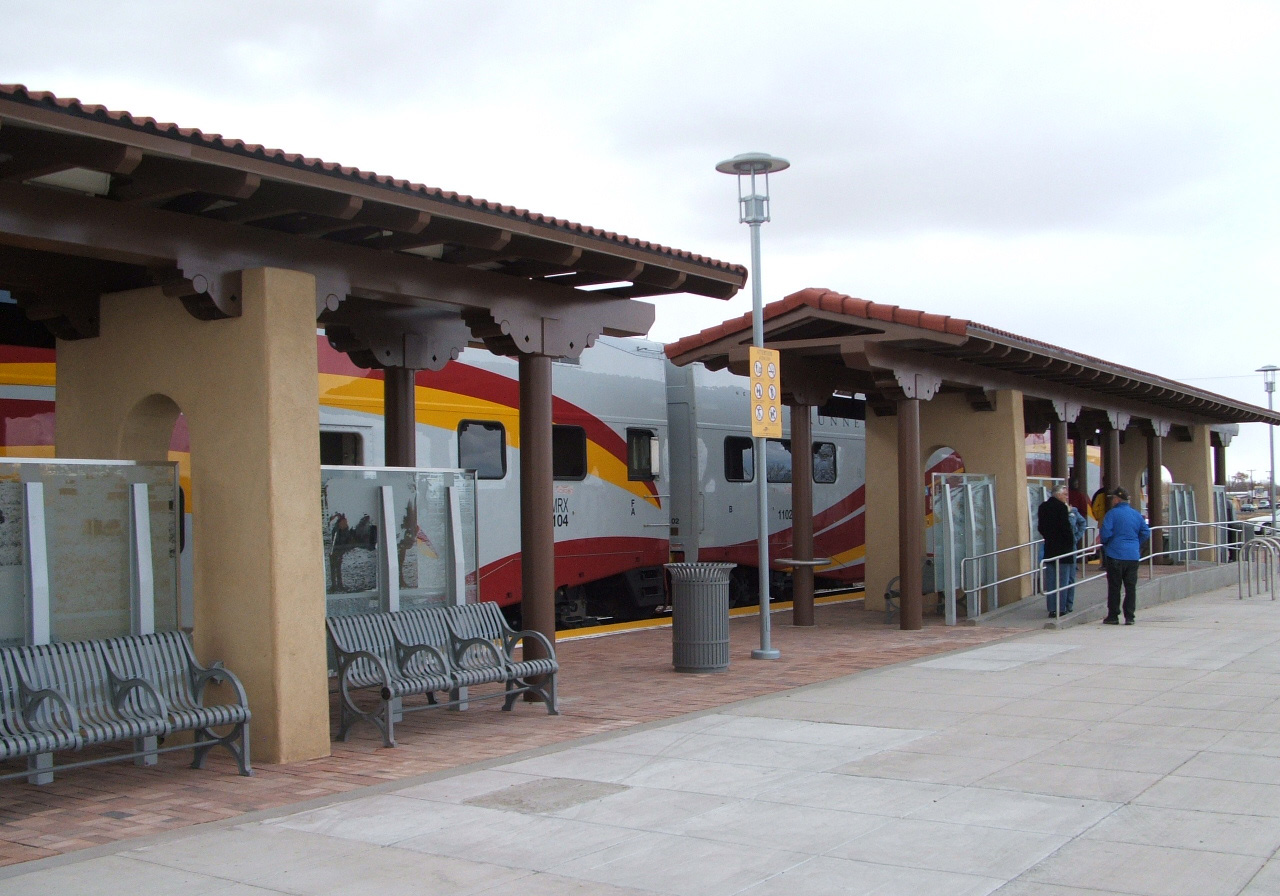
The platform
