= Sandia Pueblo station =

Sandia Pueblo
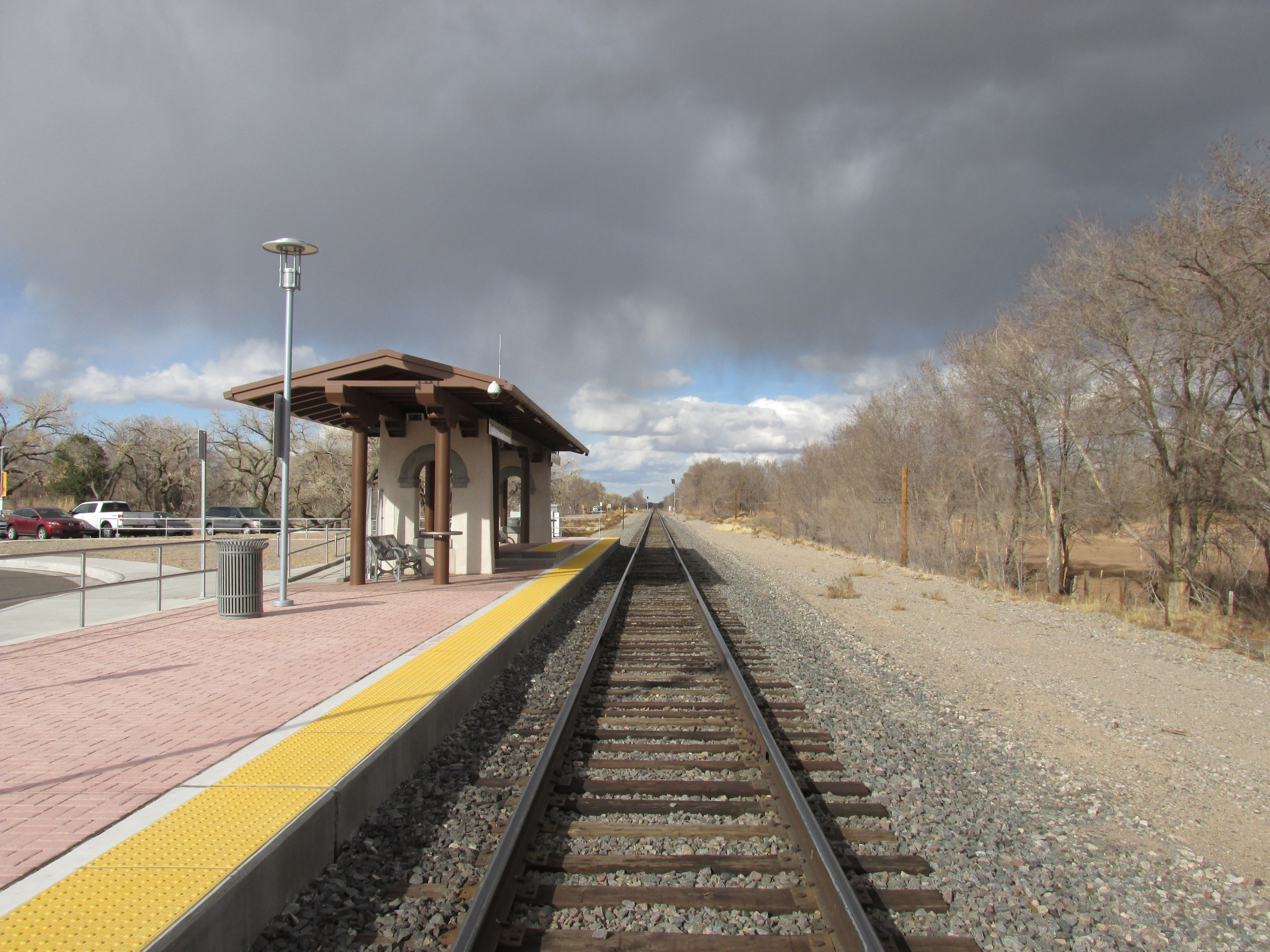

General information
- Location: NM Highways 313 and 556; Sandia Pueblo, NM
- Coordinates: 35°12′37″N 106°35′52″W
- Platforms: 1 side platform
- Tracks: 1

Construction
- Accessible: yes

Other information
- Fare zone: Zone B

History
- Opened: August 29, 2011

Services
Preceding station	New Mexico Rail Runner Express	Following station
Los Ranchos/Journal Center toward Belen	Rail Runner Express	Downtown Bernalillo toward Santa Fe Depot
Location

Sandia Pueblo is a station on the New Mexico Rail Runner Express commuter rail line. The station opened on August 29, 2011.

It is located near the Sandia Pueblo on NM Highway 313 just off Roy Avenue.

Each of the stations contains an icon to express each community's identity. The icon representing this station is a hummingbird, which is important to the Sandia people. It is one of a number of birds that is significant for its beauty and the goodwill that it carries. It is sometimes mentioned in songs and prayers.
