= Bernalillo County/International Sunport station =

American train station in New Mexico

Bernalillo County / International Sunport
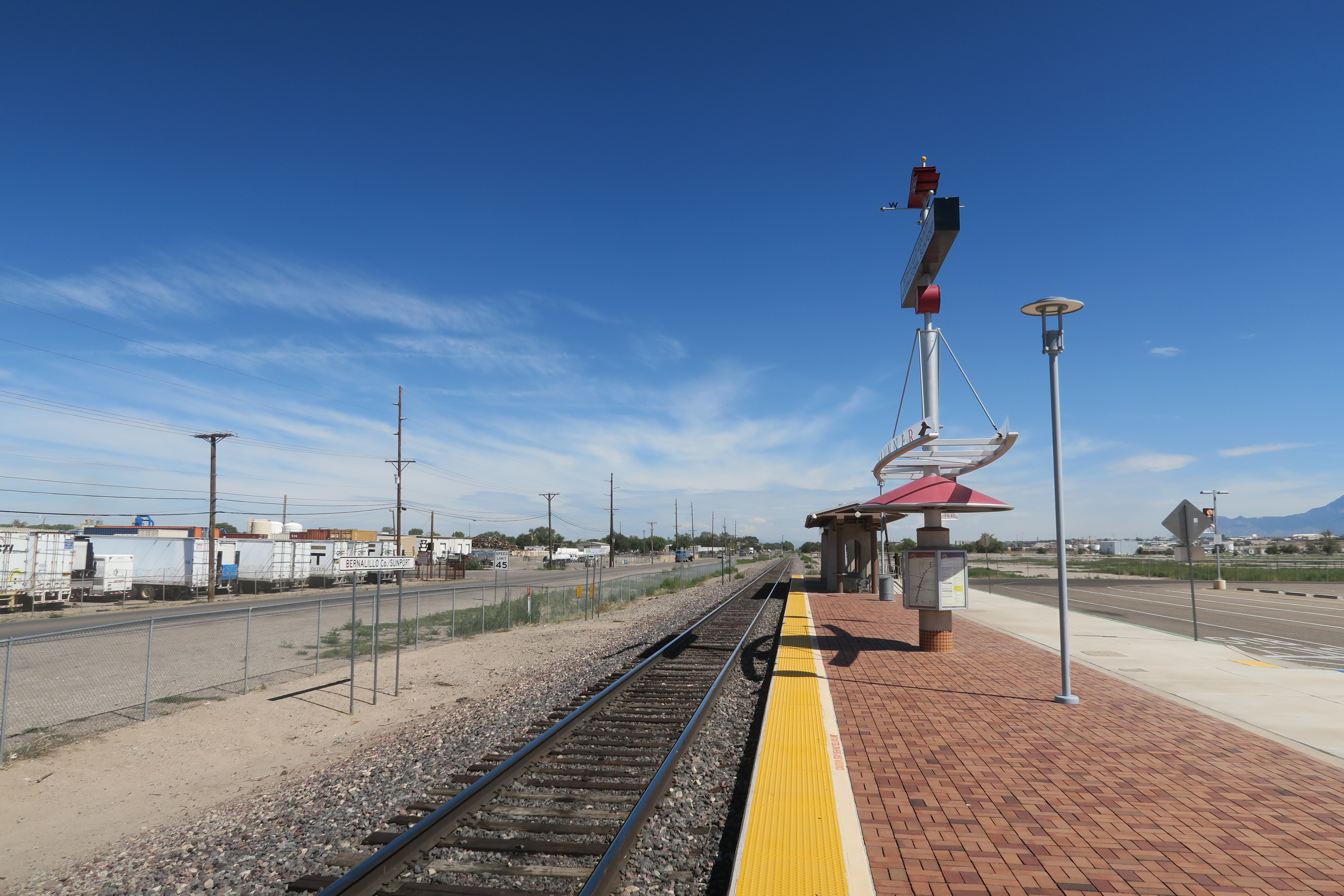

General information
- Location: 113 Rio Bravo Boulevard, Southwest; South Valley, New Mexico
- Coordinates: 35°1′49″N 106°39′26″W
- Platforms: 1 side platform
- Tracks: 1

Construction
- Parking: 172 spaces
- Accessible: yes

Other information
- Fare zone: Zone B

History
- Opened: April 20, 2007

Services
Preceding station	New Mexico Rail Runner Express	Following station
Isleta Pueblo toward Belen	Rail Runner Express	Downtown Albuquerque toward Santa Fe Depot
Location

Bernalillo County/International Sunport is a station on the New Mexico Rail Runner Express commuter rail line, located in South Valley, New Mexico, United States.

It is located on Second Street, just north of Rio Bravo, and is accessible via Second Street and Prince Street. It serves the residents of the South Valley and as a connection to the Albuquerque International Sunport. The station began service on April 20, 2007 as the sixth station on the line.

Passengers can transfer to ABQRide Route 222, which connects the station to the South Valley, the Sunport and the Kirtland Air Force Base. The station has free parking, with 172 spaces.

Each of the Rail Runner stations contains an icon to express each community's identity. The icon representing this station is an ear of corn and the sun, which has a meaning that is actually twofold. The corn reflects the South Valley's agricultural heritage, which remains a viable economic influence in the area today. The sun in the icon represents the station’s connection to the Albuquerque International Sunport.
