= Montaño station =

Commuter rail station in New Mexico, U.S.

Montaño
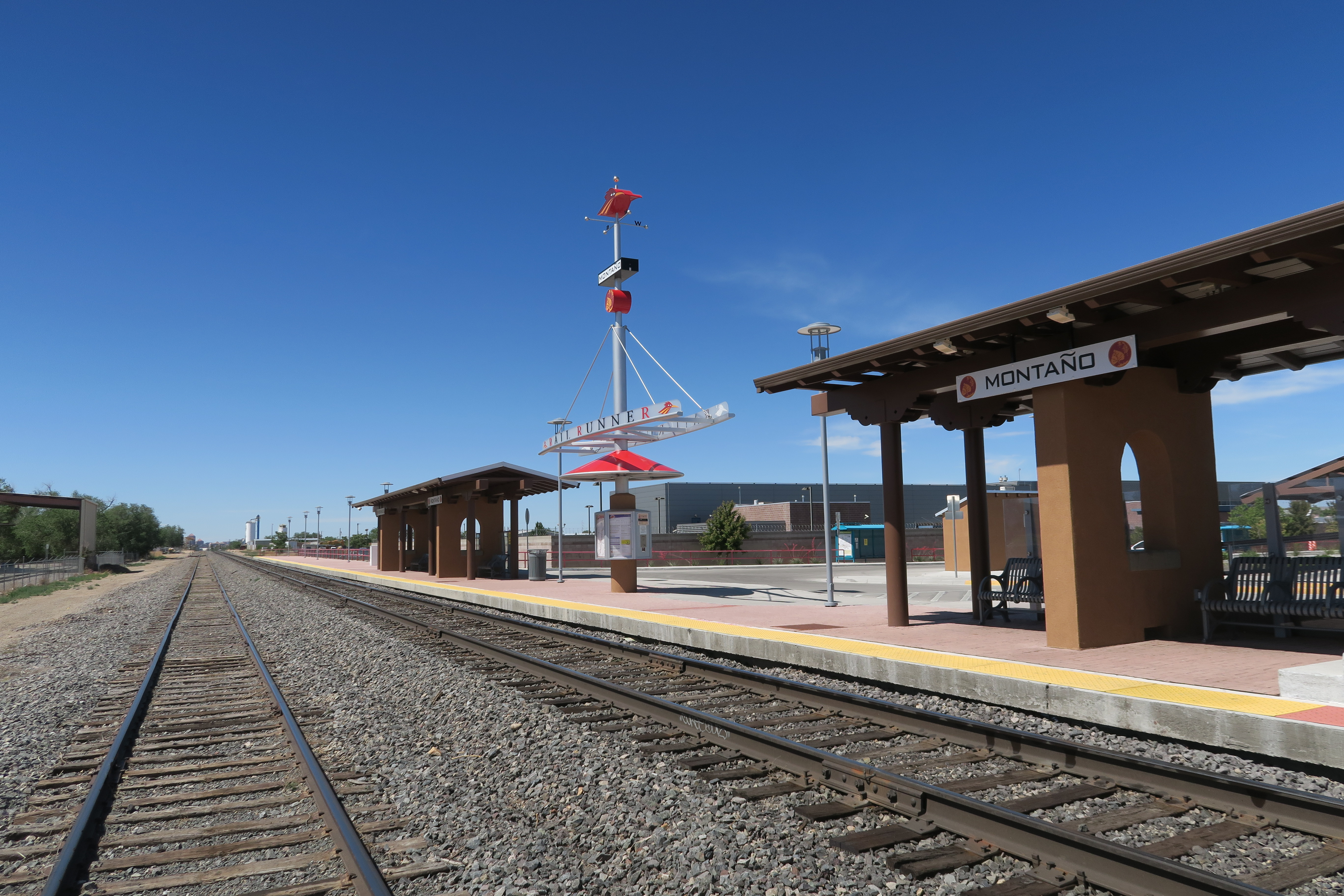

General information
- Location: 130 Montaño Rd NW, Albuquerque, New Mexico
- Coordinates: 35°08′13″N 106°37′56″W
- Platforms: 1 side platform
- Tracks: 2

Construction
- Parking: 291 Spaces
- Accessible: yes

Other information
- Fare zone: Zone B

History
- Opened: April 7, 2014

Services
Preceding station	New Mexico Rail Runner Express	Following station
Downtown Albuquerque toward Belen	Rail Runner Express	Los Ranchos/Journal Center toward Santa Fe Depot
Location

Montaño is a station on the New Mexico Rail Runner Express commuter rail line on Montaño Rd. between Edith Blvd. and Second St., in Albuquerque, New Mexico. The station opened on April 7, 2014, marking the end of construction of the Montaño Transit Center.

The station platform and shelters were built in pueblo-revival style, and features green technology, such as LED lighting and solar panels. The platform itself can accommodate a maximum of five rail cars, correcting a problem that arose with other stations along the route concerning inadequate space for passenger cars. The parking lot offers some sheltered parking structures, as well as bicycle lockers. Bus bays have been created to accommodate current transit service to the station and allow for expansion of bus service to the Montaño Transit Center at an undisclosed future date. The transit center is designed to link residents in the north valley neighborhoods to both ABQ RIDE and the Rail Runner, and to relieve overcrowded parking lots at the Los Ranchos/Journal Center station.

Starting January 11, passengers can transfer to ABQ RIDE route 157, which serves both Cottonwood and Coronado malls, and Kirtland Air Force Base. The station is also served by the NMDOT Park and Ride Purple route.

Each of the stations contains an icon to express each community's identity. The icon representing this station represents is a leaf from a cottonwood tree, which is native to the Rio Grande region.
