= Downtown Bernalillo station =

Downtown Bernalillo
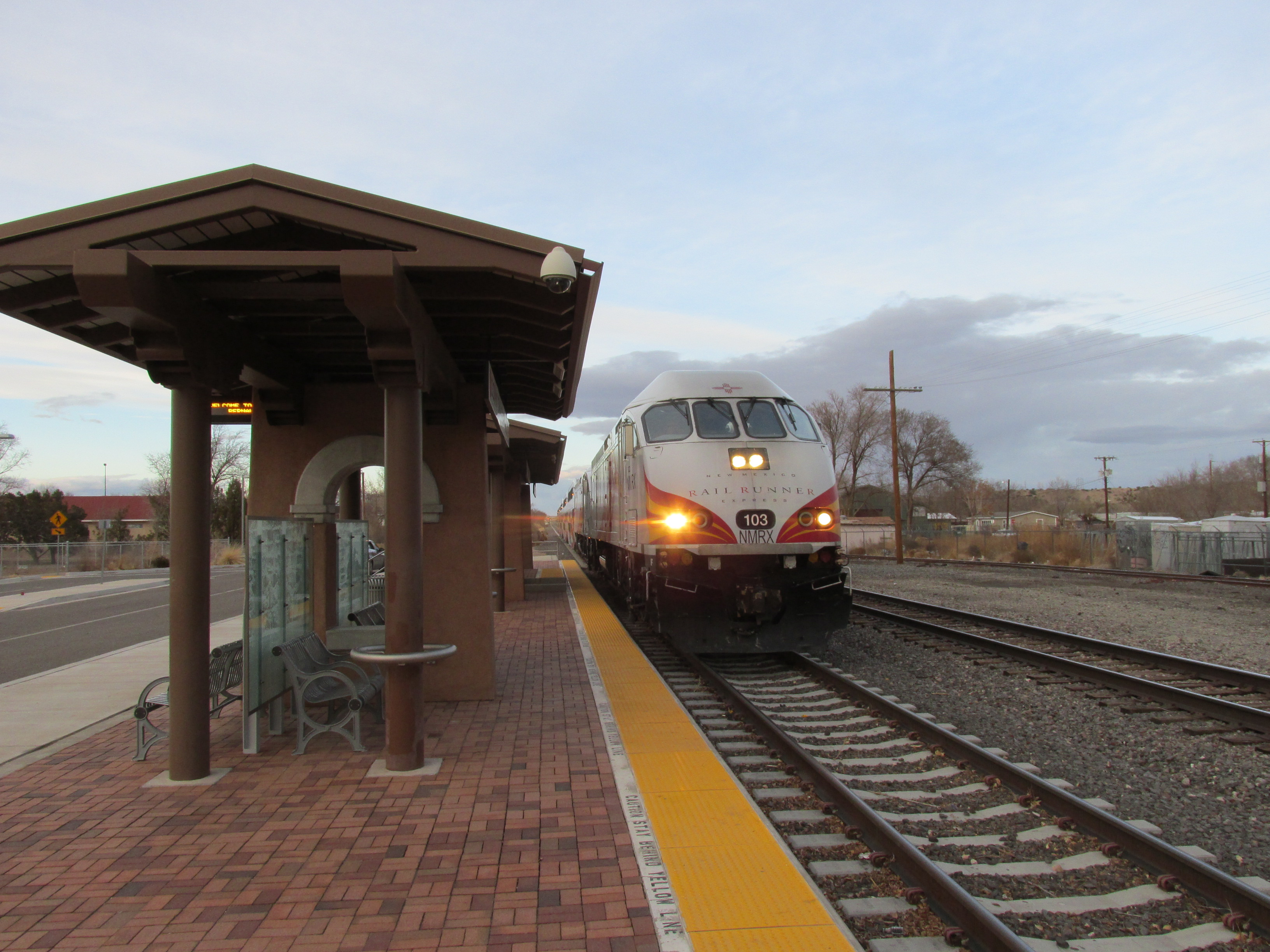

General information
- Location: 820 Railroad Track Road, Bernalillo, New Mexico 87004
- Coordinates: 35°18′13″N 106°32′49″W
- Platforms: 1 side platform
- Tracks: 1

Construction
- Parking: 23 spaces
- Accessible: yes

Other information
- Fare zone: Zone C

History
- Opened: April 27, 2007

Services
| Preceding station | New Mexico Rail Runner Express | Following station |
|---|---|---|
| Sandia Pueblo toward Belen | Rail Runner Express | Sandoval County/US 550 toward Santa Fe Depot |
Location

Downtown Bernalillo is a station on the New Mexico Rail Runner Express commuter rail line, located in Bernalillo, New Mexico, United States.

It is located in the center of the town of Bernalillo, on Railroad Track Road at East Calle Don Francisco and Calle Duranes near Camino del Pueblo. The station began service on April 27, 2007 as the seventh station on the line.

The station has free parking, with 23 spaces. The parking lot is the smallest of any Rail Runner station, because the station is so centrally located that many Bernalillo residents can walk to the station from their homes. The Station previously received bus service from Sandoval Easy Express, but has since been discontinued, and Sandoval Easy Express has been folded into the Rio Metro service.

Each of the Rail Runner stations contains an icon to express each community's identity. The icon representing this station is a conquistador helmet, representing the expedition of Francisco Vásquez de Coronado, who passed through what is now Bernalillo.
