= Los Lunas station (Atchison, Topeka and Santa Fe Railway) =

Former rail station in New Mexico, U.S.

- Atchison, Topeka, and Santa Fe Railroad Depot
- U.S. National Register of Historic Places
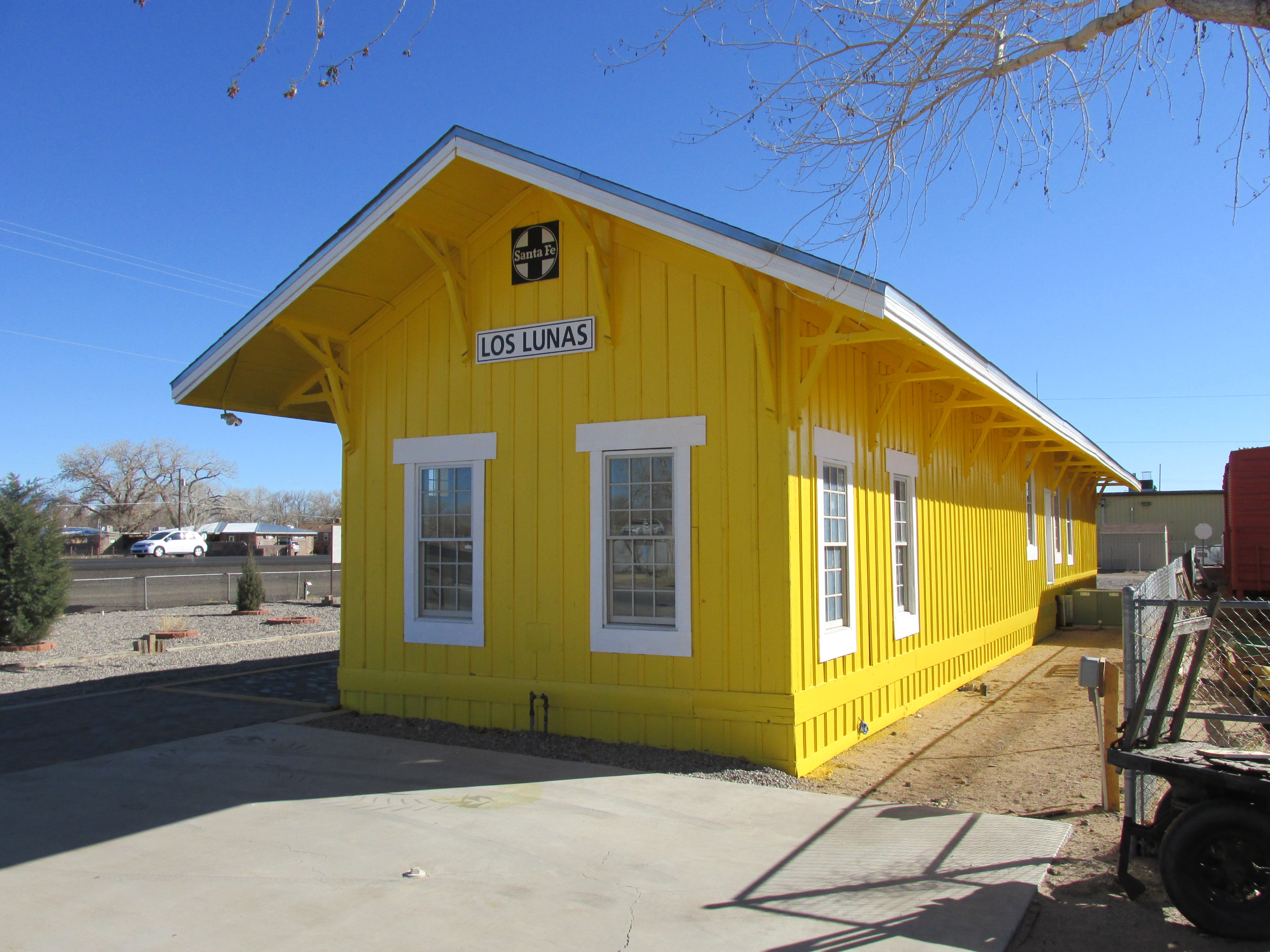

- Location within New Mexico
- Location: New Mexico State Road 314, Los Lunas, New Mexico
- Coordinates: 34.795027°N 106.738934°W
- Area: less than one acre
- Built: 1879
- Architect: Atchison, Topeka & Santa Fe Railway
- NRHP reference No.: 79001562
- Added to NRHP: August 1, 1979

The Atchison, Topeka, and Santa Fe Railroad Depot in Los Lunas, New Mexico was built in 1879. It was listed on the National Register of Historic Places in 1979.

It an Atchison, Topeka & Santa Fe Railway station no longer in use, now located on New Mexico State Road 314, which formerly was the routing of U.S. Route 85, about 0.9 miles (1.4 km) south of its intersection with Highway 6. The depot was moved in 1976 to its current location.

It is notable as one of the oldest depots in New Mexico, and is the oldest in the state of its standard type used by the A.T. & S.F. throughout the late 1800s.

Originally it was 118.5 feet (36.1 m) long. Its freight room was expanded in 1886 and then shortened by 30 feet (9.1 m) in 1942.

Signage in 2016 indicates it is currently a Veterans of Foreign Wars post.

Preceding station	Atchison, Topeka and Santa Fe Railway	Following station
Chloe toward El Paso	El Paso Branch	Isleta toward Albuquerque
