= Isleta station =

Coordinates: 34.907°N 106.698°W

Isleta
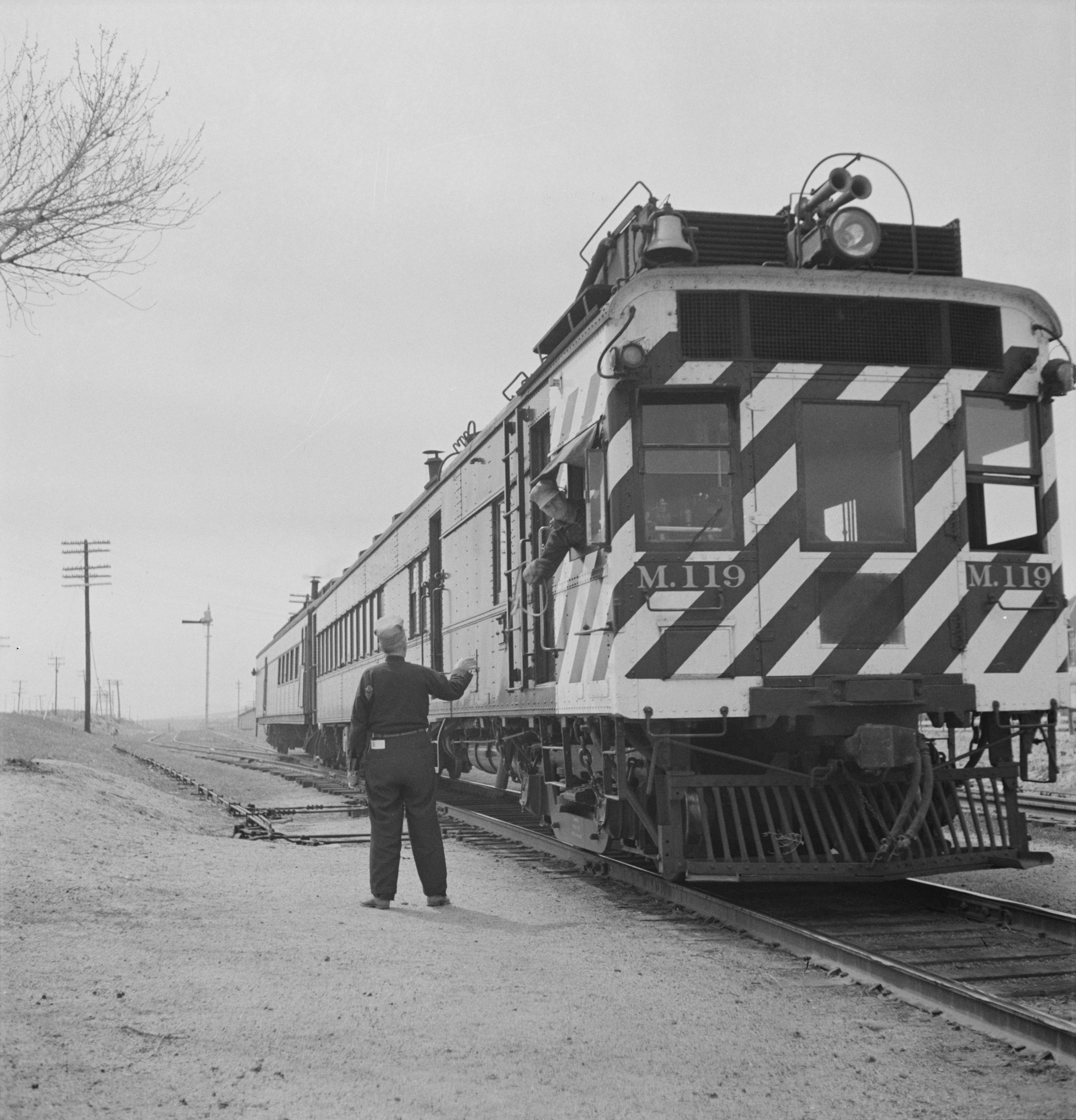
- A "doodlebug" at Isleta in 1943

General information
- Location: Trackside; Isleta Village Proper, New Mexico
- System: Former ATSF passenger rail station
- Owner: Atchison, Topeka and Santa Fe Railway (– 1996); BNSF Railway (1996 –)
- Tracks: 2

Construction
- Structure type: at-grade

Former services
| Preceding station | Atchison, Topeka and Santa Fe Railway | Following station |
|---|---|---|
| Dailes toward Los Angeles | Main Line | Albuquerque toward Chicago |
| Los Lunas toward El Paso | El Paso Branch | Albuquerque Terminus |
Location

Isleta Station was a railway station on the Atchison, Topeka and Santa Fe Railway in Isleta, New Mexico. Located 12 miles (19 km) south of Albuquerque, Isleta was a junction station, located at the point where two lines split. One line went to El Paso, Texas, while the other was the main line to Los Angeles. The Southwest Chief passenger train now passes by on the Los Angeles line.

== History ==
Isleta was at the eastern end of the Atlantic and Pacific Railroad (A&P), which was partly owned by the Santa Fe and partly owned by the Frisco Lines. Operated by both railroads, construction started in 1880 and continued 75 miles west until summer 1883 when it met arch rivel Southern Pacific at Needles, California. This line between Needles and Mojave was built by SP for the single purpose of stopping the Santa Fe from getting to California. The A&P was originally planned to head west out of Albuquerque, which would have bypassed Isleta. This route was abandoned because of many steep grades and a heavier cost of construction.

In 1890, the Santa Fe gained full control of the Frisco and sold the Western division (Isleta – Needles) to the Santa Fe subsidiary Santa Fe Pacific Railroad. They merged with Frisco successor Burlington Northern to form the BNSF Railway. It is now a part of the Southern Transcon.
