= Alvarado Transportation Center =

Transit hub in the United States

Alvarado Transportation Center Albuquerque, NM
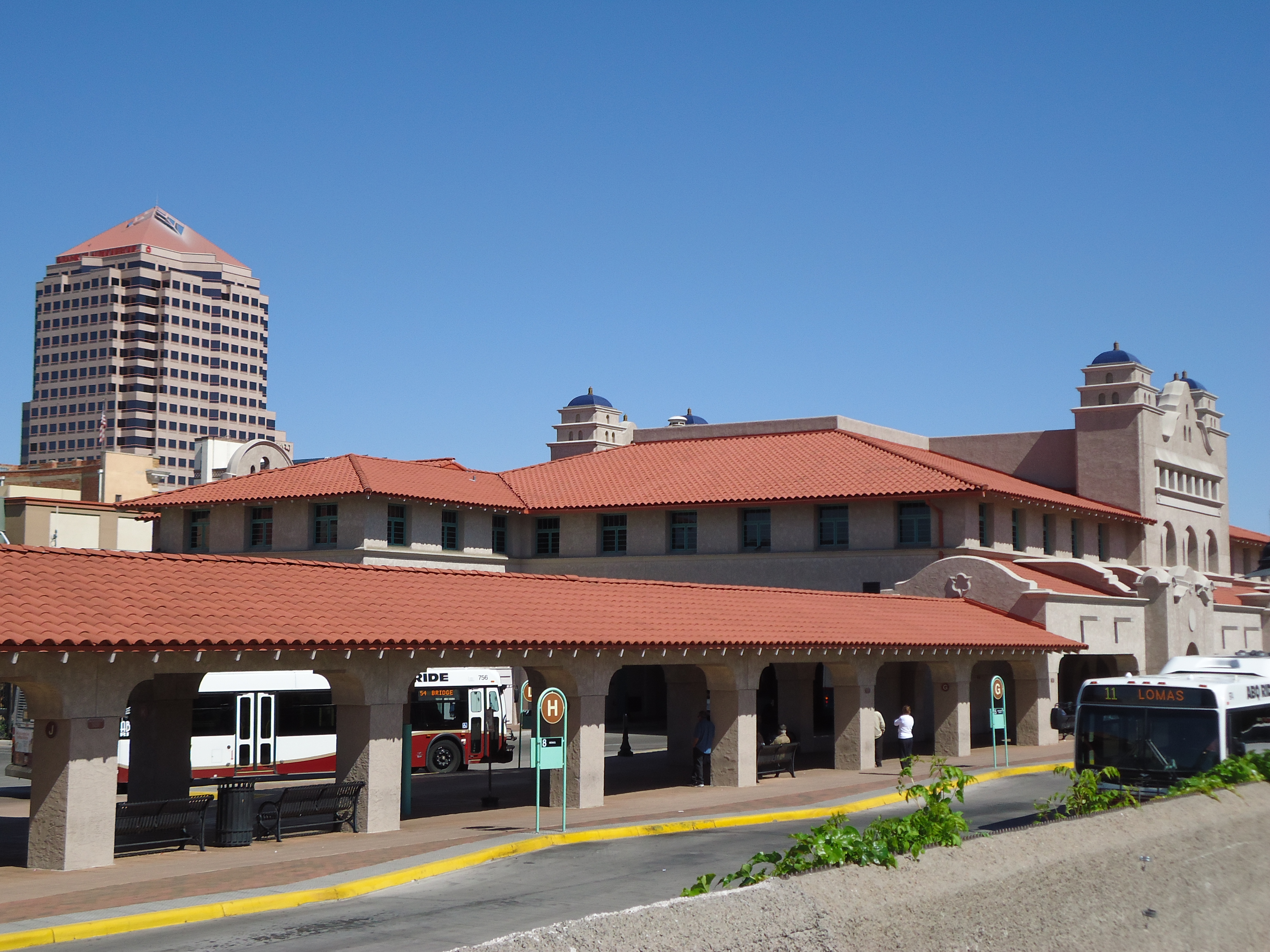
- ABQ Ride Bus bay, with Alvarado Building

General information
- Location: 100 First Street Southwest; Albuquerque, New Mexico
- Coordinates: 35.0834°N 106.6478°W
- Owner: City of Albuquerque
- Platforms: 1 side platform, 3 island platforms
- Tracks: 4
- Connections: Greyhound Lines, ABQRide

Construction
- Parking: No
- Cycle facilities: Yes
- Accessible: yes

Other information
- Station code: Amtrak: ABQ
- Fare zone: Zone B (Rail Runner)

History
- Opened: 2002 (Alvarado TC, ABQRide); 2006 (NMRX); 2008 (Amtrak)

Passengers
- FY 2025: 58,919 (Amtrak)

Services
Preceding station	Amtrak	Following station
Gallup toward Los Angeles	Southwest Chief	Lamy toward Chicago
Preceding station	New Mexico Rail Runner Express	Following station
Bernalillo County toward Belen	Rail Runner Express	Montaño toward Santa Fe Depot
Former services
Preceding station	Atchison, Topeka and Santa Fe Railway	Following station
Isleta toward Los Angeles	Main Line	Alameda toward Chicago
Isleta toward El Paso	El Paso Branch	Terminus
Location

The Alvarado Transportation Center (ATC) is a multimodal transit hub located at 100 1st Street SW in Downtown Albuquerque, New Mexico. The complex was built as a hub for Albuquerque's regional transit system and as a replacement for Albuquerque's previous bus depot and train station. The center serves ABQ RIDE, Amtrak, Greyhound Lines, and the New Mexico Rail Runner Express commuter rail line.

The ATC's Mission Revival-style building was designed to be reminiscent of the Alvarado Hotel, a railroad hotel which was formerly located on the site. The ATC also features a clock tower, located on the northwest corner of the complex, facing the intersection of Central Avenue and First Street.

== History ==
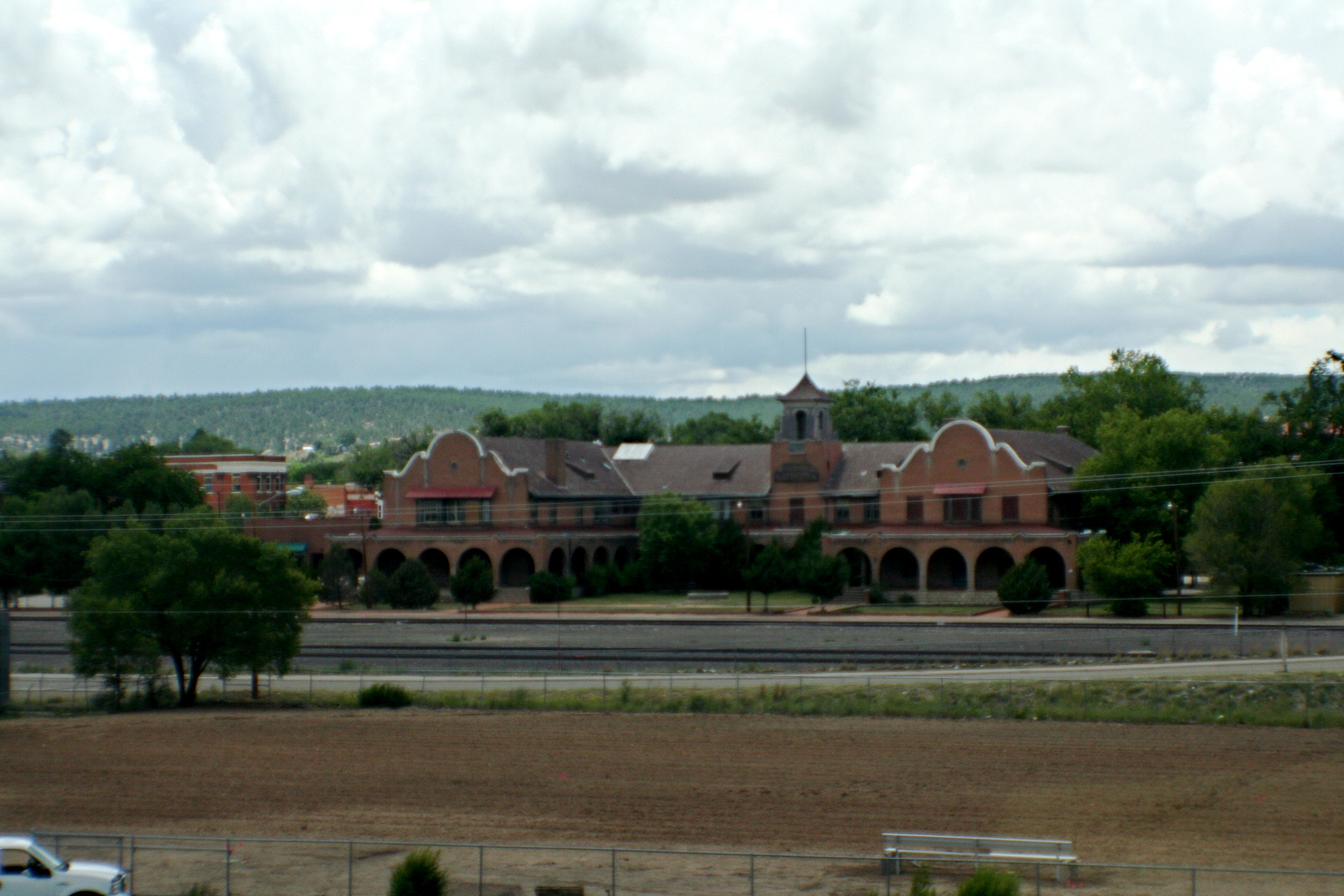
The La Castañeda in Las Vegas, New Mexico, was built in 1899 as a Harvey House in the same mission revival style and sister hotel to the Alvarado.

Albuquerque's first train station, a small railroad depot, opened on the site of the current ATC in the 1880s. With increasing demand for a larger facility, the Alvarado Hotel, a Mission Revival-style building which served as one of the many Harvey Houses along the train route, was constructed on the site in 1902. Santa Fe Railroad architect Charles Whittlesey designed the building, and Mary Colter designed the interior of the hotel. The hotel was named for Hernando de Alvarado of the 1540 Francisco Vásquez de Coronado Expedition. Just south of the hotel a train station was constructed, also in the Mission Revival style and with a large, distinctive tower.

The Alvarado Hotel was renowned for its luxury, but by the mid-20th century, with the decline in railroad travel in the United States, the hotel fell on hard times and was demolished in 1970. The site remained a dirt parking lot for many years. The station was destroyed by fire on January 4, 1993. Amtrak thereafter used a small facility on the site as the train station.

The current ATC complex was constructed in the 2000s and was designed by Dekker/Perich/Sabatini, an Albuquerque firm of architects. The first phase of the project was completed in 2002 to serve ABQRide. The second phase, completed in 2006, added facilities for Amtrak, Greyhound Lines, and the New Mexico Rail Runner Express commuter rail line. The ATC was designed to be reminiscent of the old buildings, with many architectural elements borrowed from the Alvarado Hotel and the former train station.

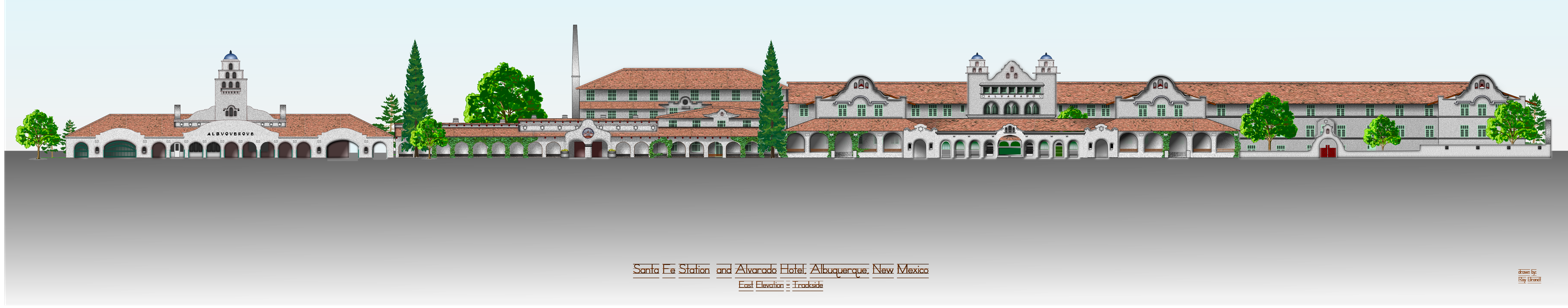
Albuquerque's Alvarado Hotel (Fred Harvey Hotel), Native American Building, Laundry Building, Santa Fe Train Station and Shop Area. This Campus was built in 1902 and was torn down in 1970. This drawing captures its Mission Revival Style appearance in east elevation (The raised train track platform stood in front of this view, with a garden between the platform and the buildings, and is not shown here as it would hide the lower arcade).

== Services ==
=== Amtrak service ===
Albuquerque is a stop on Amtrak's daily Southwest Chief line. In both directions, it is a layover stop, where passengers can disembark while the train is cleaned, refueled, serviced, and the crew is changed.

Amtrak moved its passenger service operations at Albuquerque to the Alvarado Transportation Center on January 17, 2008, sharing space with providers of intercity bus services. Amtrak's previous facility, a small building located adjacent to the current depot, was in use for passenger operations since the historic Santa Fe station burned down in 1993. The old facility is closed, and serves as the baggage claim for arriving passengers, relief area for crew, and storage.

=== New Mexico Rail Runner service ===
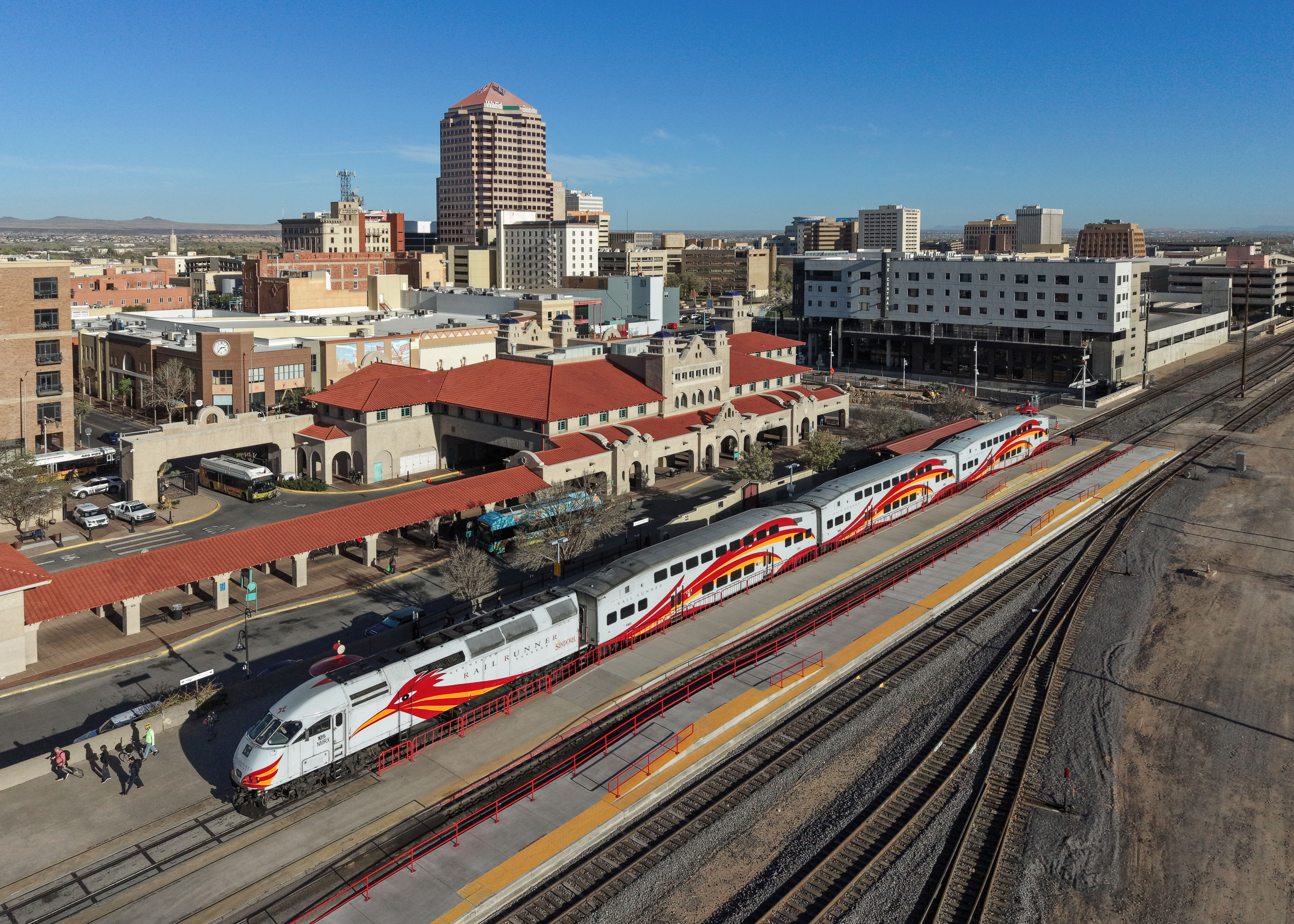
Rail Runner train at Alvarado

The New Mexico Rail Runner Express started service on July 14, 2006, between Albuquerque and Sandoval County. From 2006 to 2008, the Rail Runner expanded service to Belen and Santa Fe. This station is referred to on timetables as the "Downtown Albuquerque" station. Each of the Rail Runner stations contains an icon to express each community's identity. The icon representing this station is the ATC itself.

The Rio Metro Regional Transit District provides limited early morning and midday supplementary bus service to passengers.

=== Intercity bus service ===
The ATC's intercity bus depot makes up most of the southern side of the complex, and contains an enclosed waiting area with ticket booths for both Greyhound and Amtrak, as well as a small cafeteria. Greyhound serves the following cities from Albuquerque:

- 470 St Louis, MO
- 470 Phoenix, AZ
- 578 Denver, CO
- 578 El Paso, TX

Autobuses Americanos no longer provides direct bus service to Mexico. Passengers will need to change buses in El Paso. El Paso-Los Angeles Limousine bus service does not stop at the ATC, but rather at their own stop at I-25 Frontage Road and Menaul Blvd.

=== ABQ RIDE ===
ABQ RIDE is the local mass transit agency for metropolitan Albuquerque. The station has an indoor waiting room with a customer service desk, restrooms, and a small cafe. The building also houses the headquarters for ABQ RIDE, as well as headquarters for the transit enforcement department. Most routes in the ABQ RIDE system originate from the ATC, including:

- 5 - Montgomery/Carlisle
- 6 - Indian School Commuter
- 7 - Candelaria Commuter
- 8 - Menaul
- 10 - North Fourth Street
- 11 - Lomas
- 12 - Constitution Commuter
- 13 - Comanche Commuter
- 16 - Broadway/University/Gibson
- 36 - Rio Grande
- 40 - D-Ride Free downtown Shuttle
- 50 - Yale/Martin Luther King Jr Ave/Airport
- 53 - Isleta
- 54 - Bridge/Westgate
- 66 - Central (Eastbound stops in front of the ATC on 1st. & Central, Westbound is across Central Ave on 1st St.)
- 93 - Academy Commuter
- 94 - Unser Commuter
- 97 - Zuni
- 217 - Downtown - Kirtland AFB limited
- 250 - Free Sunport Nonstop Express [Airport]
- 766 - Rapid Ride Red Line (Eastbound stops in front of the ATC on 1st. & Central, Westbound is across Central Ave on 1st St.)
- 777 - Rapid Ride Green Line (Eastbound stops in front of the ATC on 1st. & Central, Westbound is across Central Ave on 1st St.)

The #40 D-Ride shuttle was created in 2006 as a response to the opening of the Rail Runner. It allows for commuters easy access to all of downtown Albuquerque. Other buses were also scheduled to meet with Rail Runner arrivals and departures.

=== Rio Metro and New Mexico Park and Ride service ===
New Mexico Park and Ride operates two routes at the Alvarado Transportation Center.

- The Turquoise route to and from Moriarty at bay J in the northern complex, and only has one arrival and one departure during weekdays.
- The Purple route departs the ATC from the 1st & Central stop in the morning on weekdays to supplement Rail Runner service, and there is no return trip to the ATC.

The Rio Metro Regional Transit District operates two buses at the Alvarado Transportation Center.

- Route 208 provides morning/midday service on weekdays between Downtown Albuquerque, the Pueblo of Isleta, and Valencia County
- Route 505 provides one weekday morning trip between the Sandoval Count / US 550 Rail Runner Station and Downtown Albuquerque

=== Other shuttle services ===
The University of New Mexico and UNM Hospital provides separate commuter shuttles to the ATC for UNM and UNMH Students, staff, and faculty. These operate between the northern and southern complexes, in front of the old Amtrak building, and are free to ride. They are timed to meet certain Rail Runner arrivals and departures.

Taxi and limo service, as well as personal pick-ups and drop-offs (Kiss-n-Ride) for the entire facility happen at the southern complex, in front of the entrance to the Amtrak/Greyhound waiting room. Other shuttle services operate on 1st Street between the Northern and Southern complexes in front of the old Amtrak building.

=== Parking ===
There is no dedicated parking for the ATC, except for Amtrak, Greyhound, and ABQ RIDE employees. The City of Albuquerque operates other parking areas near the ATC, including:

- Paid parking garage across from the ATC on 1st Street, although cars must enter on 2nd Street.
- Limited 30 minute free on-street parking on 1st Street in front of the southern complex for Greyhound and Amtrak passengers
- Limited 3 hour free on-street parking on 1st Street south of the Coal Ave. overpass
- Metered parking on Silver, Gold, and Central Avenues across the street from the ATC.

== Future changes ==
The City of Albuquerque is working with the State of New Mexico and the Mid-Region Council of Governments, as well as other organizations to improve the area for both pedestrians and transit options.

=== New pedestrian access ===
The City of Albuquerque has applied for federal funds to change the pedestrian path at the railroad tracks by changing the underpass to a level crossing with the tracks. Currently, pedestrians must go the corner of 1st and Central before they can get to the underpass or the ATC. The underpass has been considered an undesirable area, and the plans to change it will make it easier for pedestrians and bicyclists to get to and from the ATC, as well as crossing Central Ave.

=== Bus rapid transit ===
The City of Albuquerque is in the final planning stages of Albuquerque Rapid Transit, a true BRT system intended to replace the current Rapid Ride system. The design calls for using the existing Rapid Ride stop for eastbound buses, and constructing a new median platform on Central Ave east of 1st St. for westbound buses.

== Gallery ==
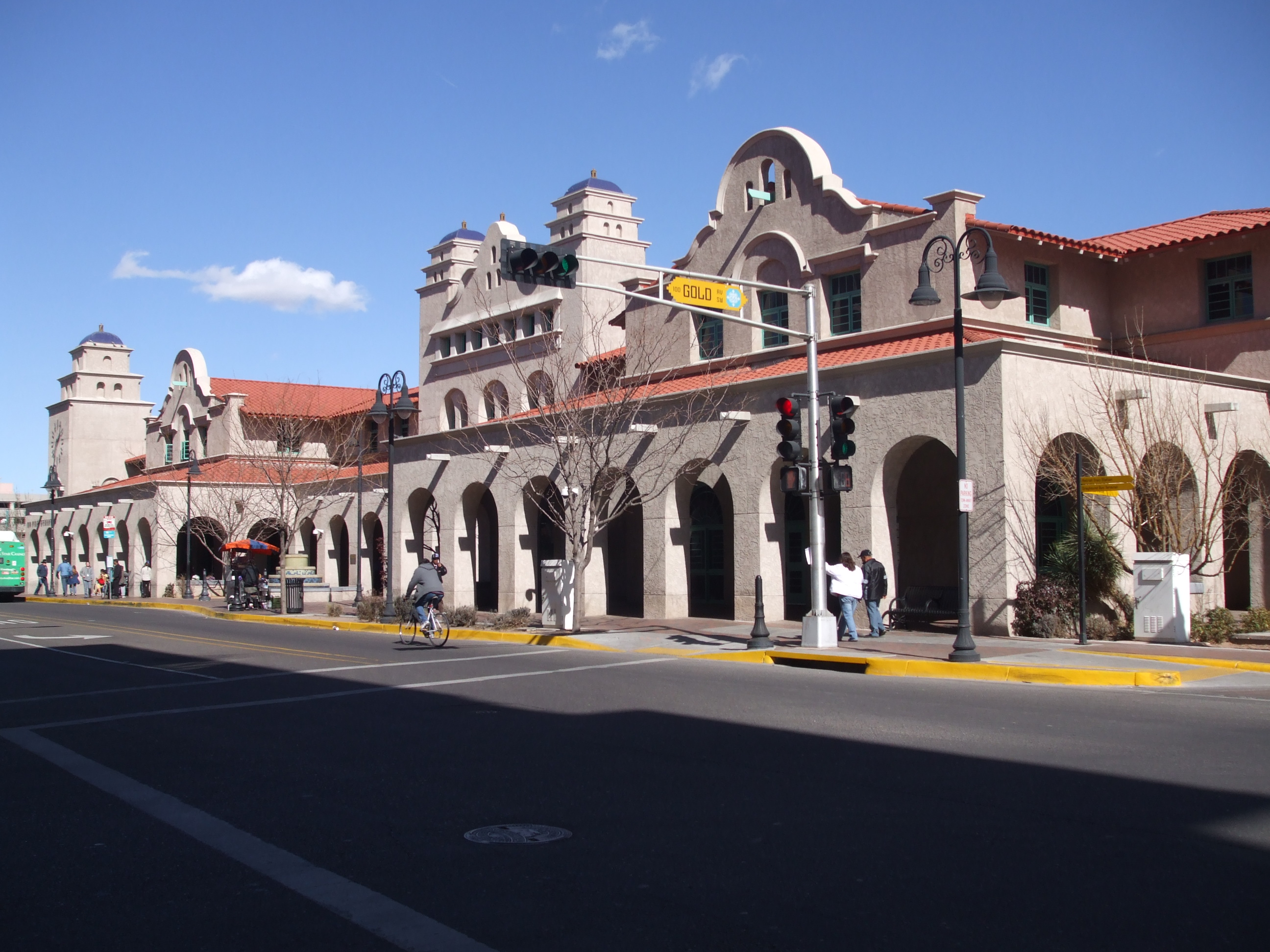
The ATC viewed from 1st Street

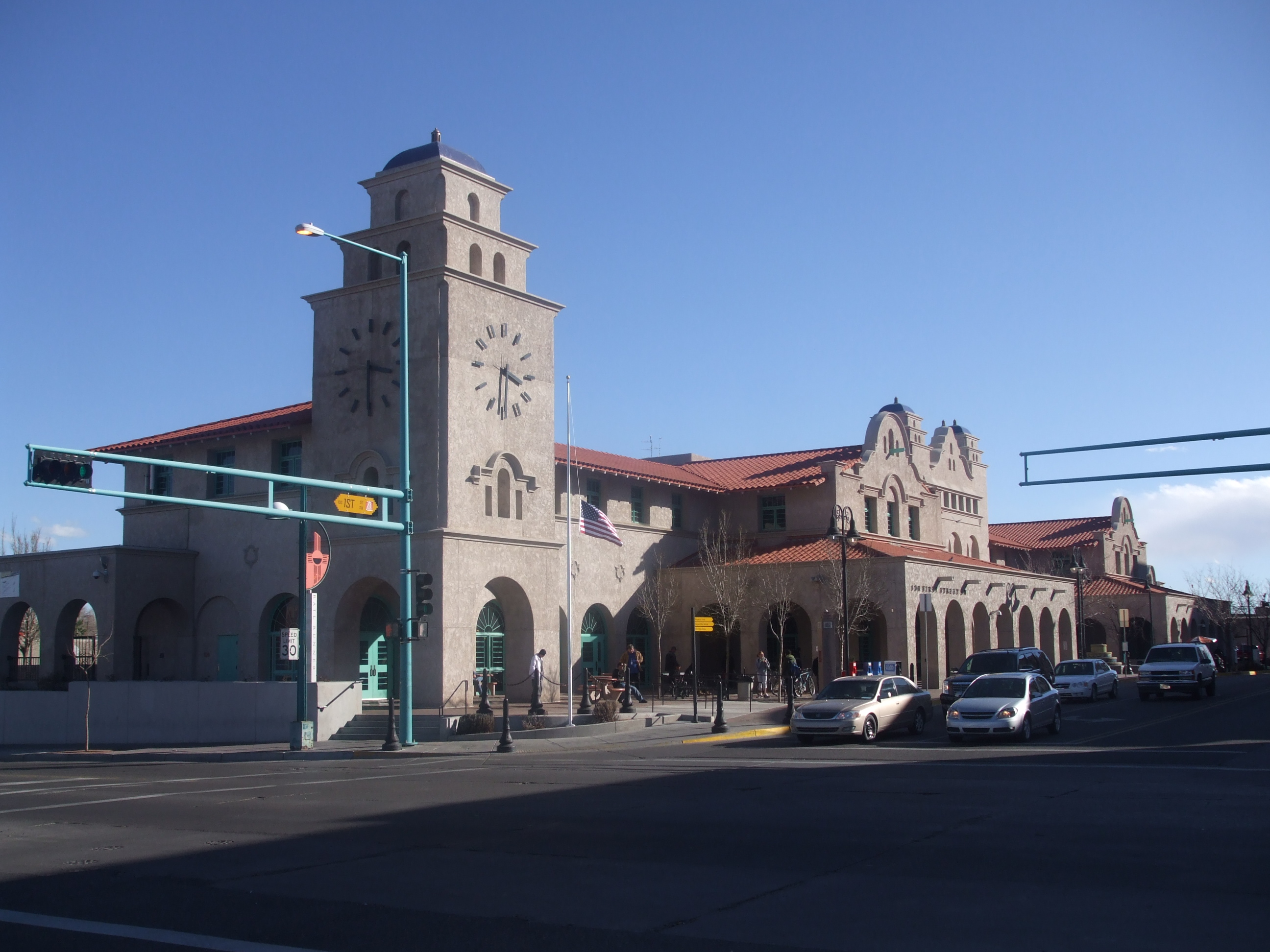
The Clock Tower at Central & 1st

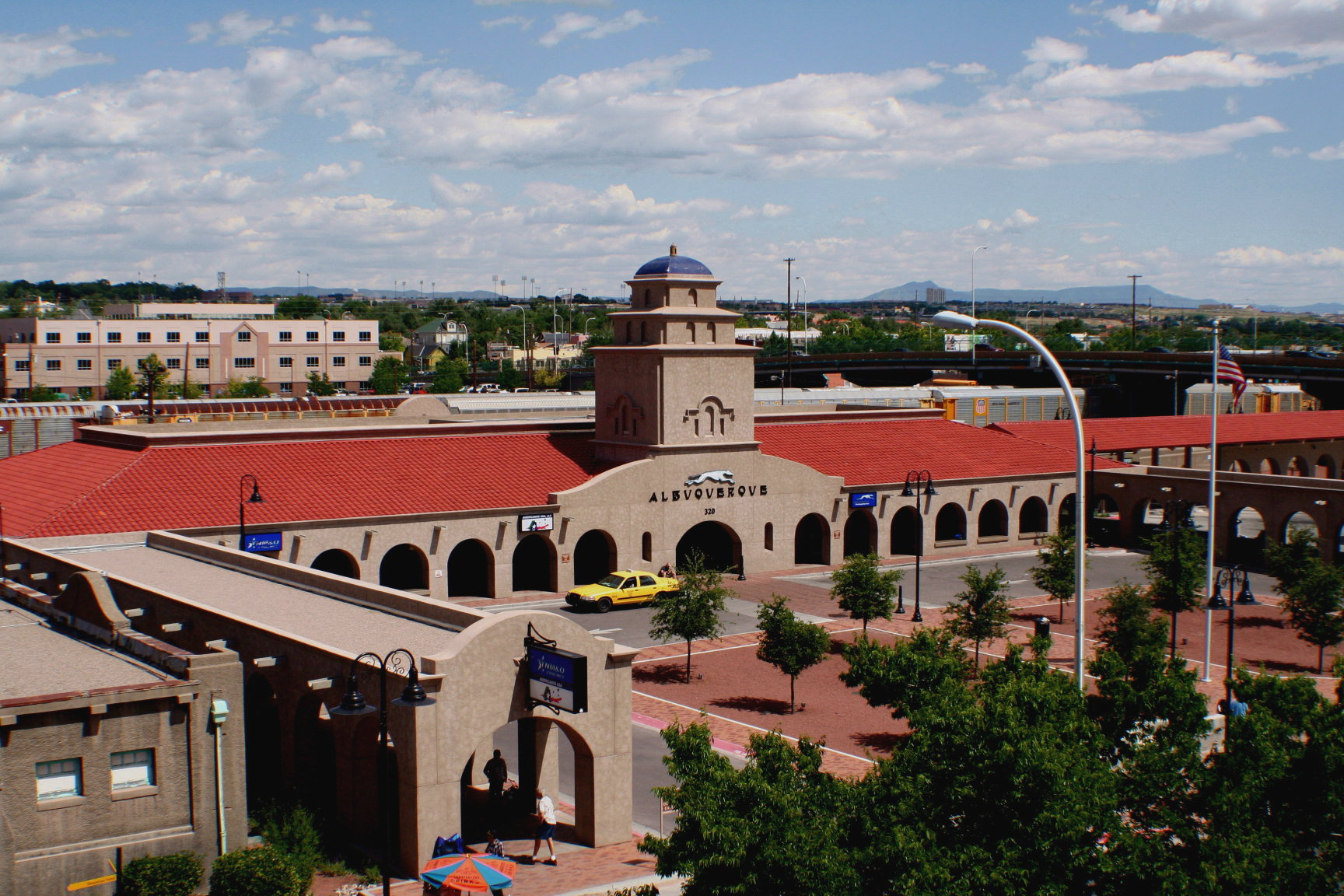
The bus depot and Amtrak station

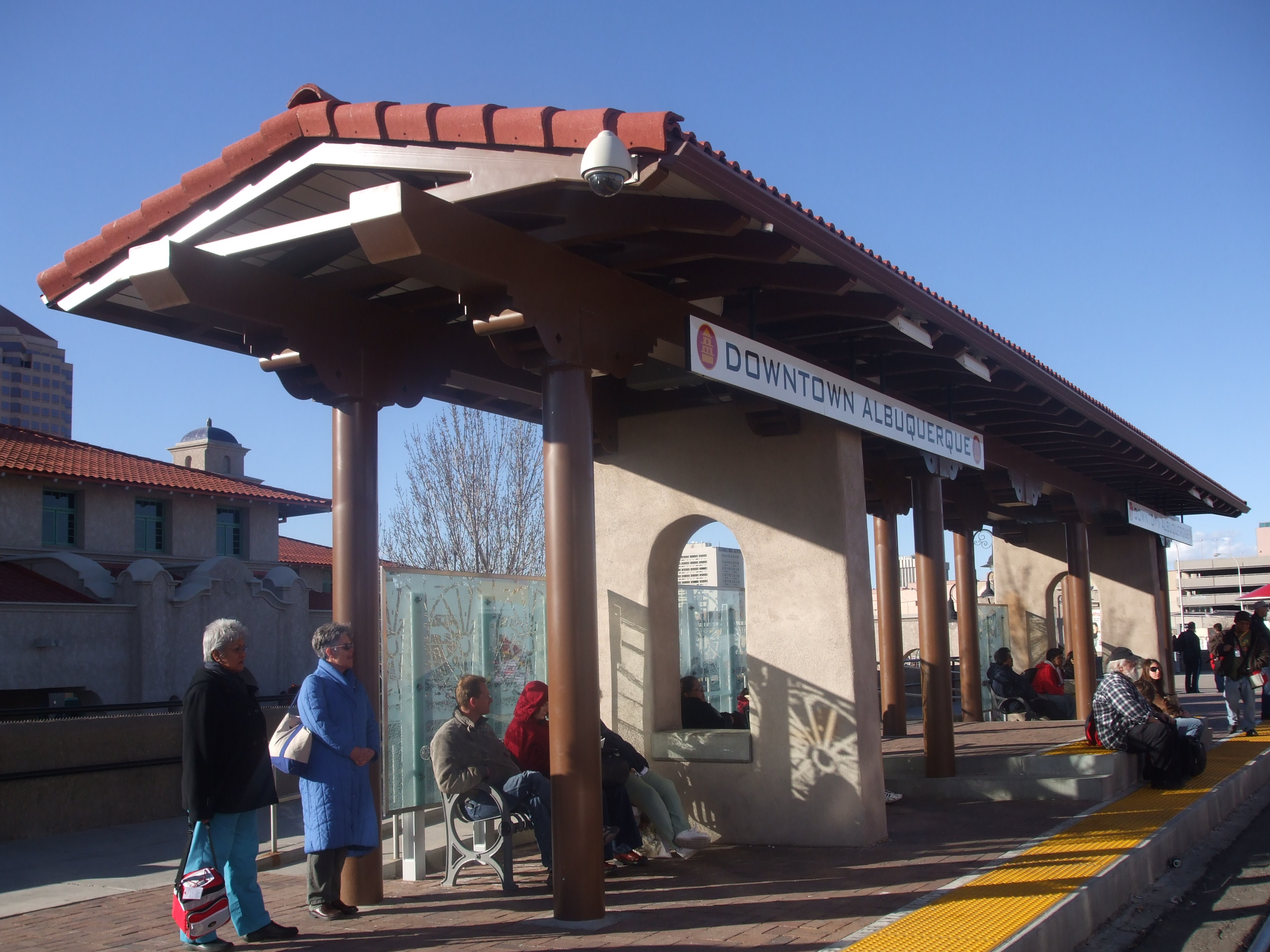
The Rail Runner station

== See also ==
- List of Amtrak stations
