= New Mexico Rail Runner Express =

Commuter rail system in New Mexico, US

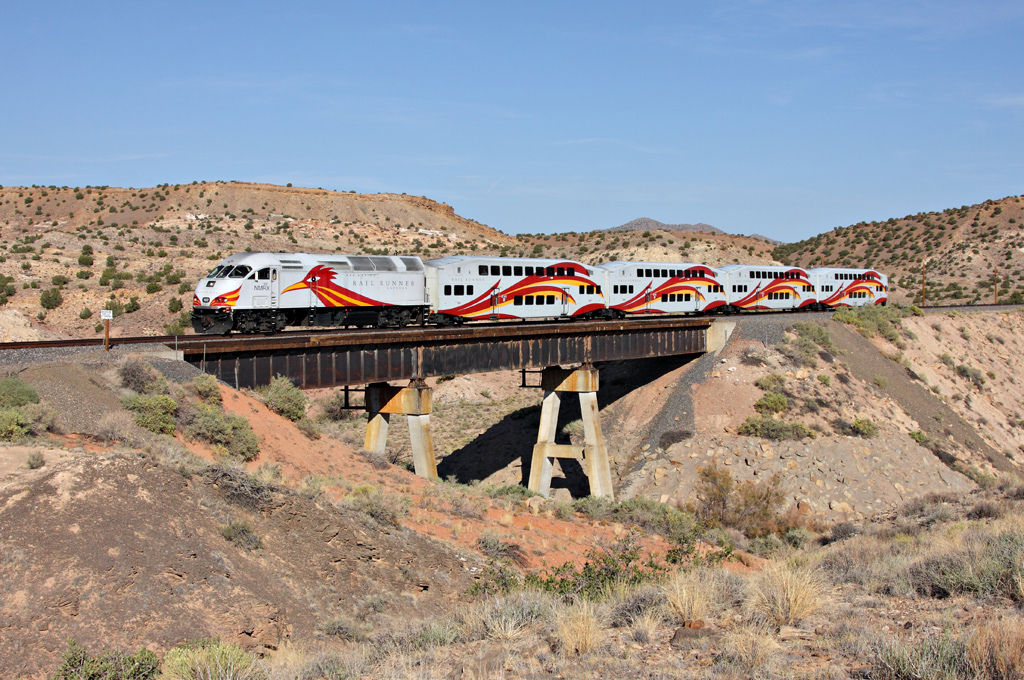
- New Mexico Rail Runner Express at La Bajada Hill

Overview
- Owner: NMDOT
- Locale: Albuquerque, New Mexico (metropolitan area)
- Transit type: Commuter rail
- Number of lines: 1
- Number of stations: 15
- Daily ridership: 3,600 (weekdays, Q2 2026)
- Annual ridership: 771,100 (2025)
- Website: riometro.org

Operation
- Began operation: July 14, 2006
- Operators: Rio Metro, Herzog Transit Services Inc.
- Reporting marks: NMRX

Technical
- System length: 97 miles (156 km)
- Track gauge: 4 ft 8 1/2 in (1,435 mm) standard gauge
- Top speed: 79 mph (130 km/h)
System map
- All stations are accessible Sources

The New Mexico Rail Runner Express (AAR reporting mark NMRX) is a commuter rail system serving the metropolitan areas of Albuquerque and Santa Fe, New Mexico, United States. It is administered by the New Mexico Department of Transportation (NMDOT) and the Rio Metro Regional Transit District (Rio Metro), a regional transportation agency, while Herzog Transit Services currently holds the contract for the operation and maintenance of the line and equipment. Phase I of the system, operating on an existing right-of-way from Belen to Bernalillo that NMDOT purchased from BNSF Railway, opened in July 2006. Phase II, the extension of the line to Santa Fe, opened in December 2008. Daily ridership, as of February 2019, was 2,200 trips per day. In 2025, the system had a ridership of 771,100, or about 3,600 per weekday as of the second quarter of 2026.

== History ==
The concept of passenger rail serving the Central New Mexico corridor had been discussed for decades, but it was not until August 2003, when New Mexico Governor Bill Richardson announced that his administration was going to pursue the implementation of commuter rail service, that a serious effort got underway. Later that same year, grants were given to NMDOT and MRCOG to begin the effort, and the New Mexico State Legislature passed Governor Richardson's Investment Partnership (GRIP), a transportation improvement package with the Rail Runner included as one of the bill's projects.

Over the next few years, NMDOT and the Mid-Region Council of Governments (MRCOG) developed a strategy for implementing the rail service. In 2005, a name and a branding scheme was chosen. The name "Rail Runner" is a play on the name of New Mexico's state bird, the roadrunner. The cars and locomotives were received throughout the year of 2005 and groundbreaking for the first Rail Runner station took place on October 31, 2005. During this time the state also conducted negotiations with BNSF over the use of the railroad track. After assessing the needs of the track, the state of New Mexico committed to purchasing the railroad corridor from Belen to the New Mexico-Colorado border from BNSF (although, thus far only the portion between Belen and Lamy, NM has been purchased), to ensure that commuter trains would always get the right-of-way and have priority over freight trains in the corridor. While the engines are capable of 110 miles per hour (180 km/h), the track limits the maximum speed to 79 miles per hour (127 km/h).

The Rail Runner officially went into service on July 14, 2006, serving the Downtown Albuquerque, Los Ranchos, and Sandoval County stations. On December 11, 2006, the Los Lunas station opened, and on February 2, 2007, the Belen station opened, extending the line to its southern end. In April 2007, two more stations opened: Bernalillo County/International Sunport on the 20th and Downtown Bernalillo on the 27th. On December 17, 2008, the Isleta Pueblo station opened.

=== Phase II ===
Phase II, the extension of the line to Santa Fe, opened for service on December 17, 2008. Using the existing Santa Fe Southern Railway track from Lamy to Santa Fe, which is filled with sharp curves, would have required the train to slow to 15 miles per hour (24 km/h) in some places, so new tracks were laid to allow travel times comparable to the automobile. The route uses previously existing track from Bernalillo to the base of La Bajada, a hill south of Santa Fe. It then runs on newly built track on a new right-of-way from CP Madrid, for five miles and then in the I-25 median into Santa Fe, at CP Hondo, where it uses an improved Santa Fe Southern Railway track from I-25 to the terminal at the Santa Fe Railyard. Two of the planned stations for the Phase II extension opened on December 17: the South Capitol and the Santa Fe Depot stations. A third station at the NM 599/I-25 interchange in Santa Fe County opened on August 1, 2009.

After the opening of the Phase II stations, several more stations opened. Sandia Pueblo station, serving Sandia Pueblo, opened on August 29, 2011. The last planned station in Bernalillo County, the Montaño station, officially opened on April 7, 2014. Kewa Pueblo station, serving Santo Domingo Pueblo, opened on March 22, 2010. It is the first station beyond the original 13 planned stations to reach the construction stage and was built using stimulus funds. On September 12, 2009, a special events platform opened for Lobo games service only.

At the end of March in 2014, the Rail Runner added security officers to the system. Officers are charged with protecting the trains, inspecting fares, and addressing issues at the stations and parking lots. They are required to wear and use lapel cameras during incidents.

Construction of the platform at the Zia Road station, the last of the four planned stations for Phase II, was completed several years in advance of the station's opening in April 2017.

=== COVID-19 pandemic ===
Rail Runner service was suspended from March 2020 until March 2021 due to the COVID-19 pandemic. During the suspension, Rio Metro continued to run empty trains along the route in order to maintain readiness of the vehicles and crew. Weekday service resumed March 8, 2021, and full service resumed May 24, 2021.

By April 2022, daily ridership had returned to 60% of pre-pandemic levels. To attract new riders, Rio Metro announced it would slash fares by 75%—daily passes priced at $2.50 and monthly passes at $27.50—from April 18 through July 31. During this period, average ridership increased about 88% to over 1,500 boardings per day. Citing the high cost of gas, Governor Michelle Lujan Grisham announced in July that the reduced fares would be extended until the end of 2022. In addition, two round trips would be added on August 1 as part of a revised schedule focused on all-day frequency rather than traditional commuter service.

=== Criticism ===
The cost of the Rail Runner system was $135 million for the first phase and around $250 million for the second phase. Preliminary estimates indicated that the service would operate at a deficit, requiring up to $10 million in government funding annually. In late 2007, the Rail Runner was the subject of more criticism as a transportation funding shortfall left many state road projects stalled. State officials said the rising cost of construction materials and decreased federal support were the cause, but some lawmakers cited the cost of the Rail Runner as a contributing factor for the shortfall. Supporters of Rail Runner funding note that roadways and other infrastructure for passenger cars also operate at a deficit, requiring government funding for construction, operation, and maintenance.

=== Funding ===
The capital costs of the Rail Runner project were covered by state and local funds. Funding for operations of the system in its first few years was covered largely by federal Congestion Mitigation and Air Quality Improvement (CMAQ) Program funds, along with ticket revenues and some state and local funds. Operational costs were expected to rise from $10 million for the first phase to $20 million after completion of the second phase.

Federal funding for the Rail Runner was expected to stop in 2009. Two separate gross receipts taxes for regional transit were approved by voters in central and north-central New Mexico in November 2008 to cover a large portion of the operational funds of the Rail Runner. Additional funds also come from bond revenue and money appropriated by the New Mexico State Legislature.

=== Proposed expansion ===
The Environmental Assessment for Phase II considered placement of a station between Cerrillos Road and Richards Avenue in the I-25 median; it concluded that there was not yet enough demand, but recommended that it be considered for the future. A station near the Las Soleras development was studied in 2010.

An extension northward to Taos was proposed in the state legislature in 2009. An extension south to Las Cruces and El Paso has also been proposed. A memorandum to study the feasibility of such service was introduced in the state legislature in 2009, and was amended to study Las Cruces-El Paso service, but failed to pass in the New Mexico Legislature. A federal house resolution was introduced by Congressman Harry Teague in May 2009 to study the concept, but did not get out of committee.

=== Ridership ===
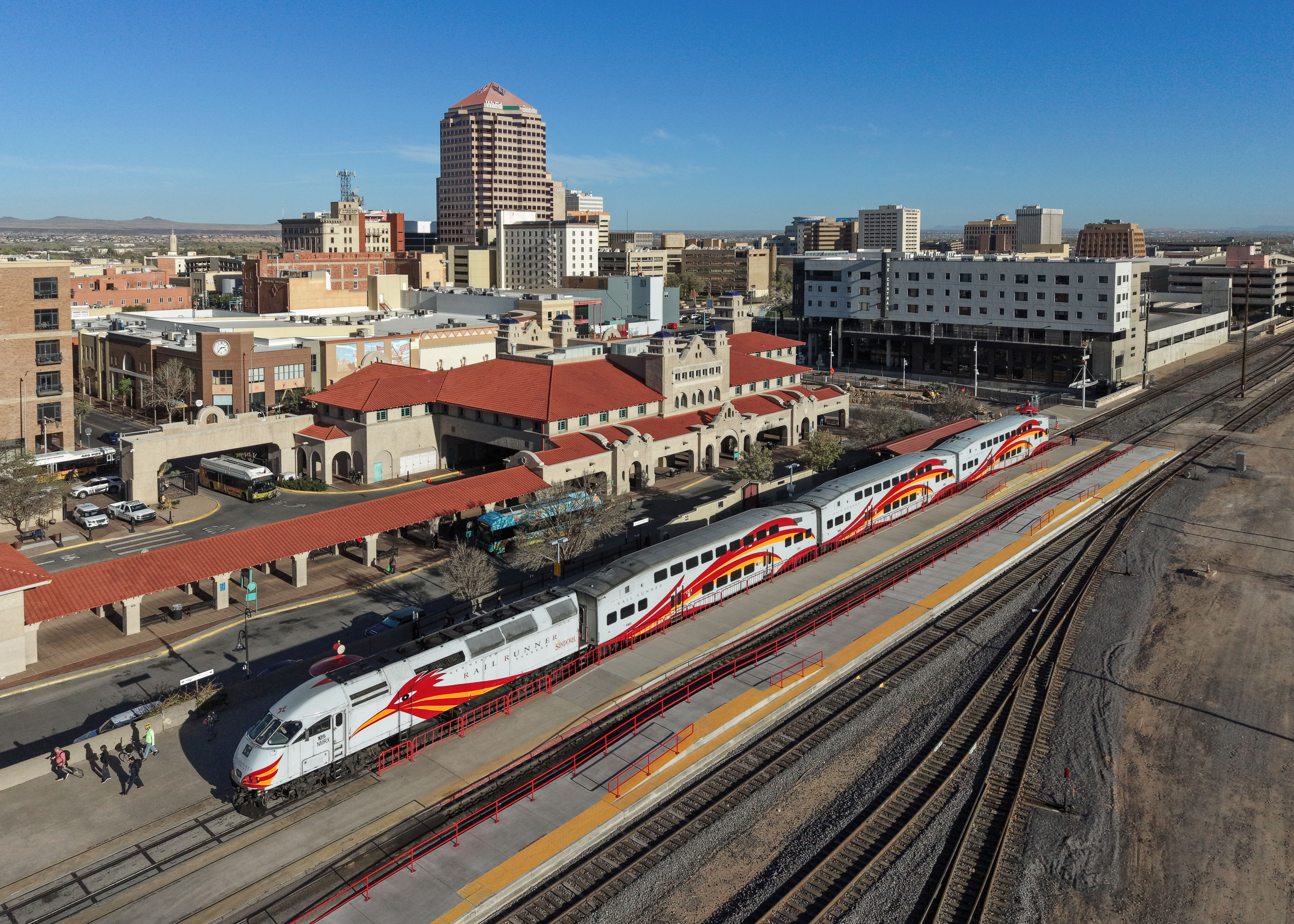
Rail Runner train at Alvarado Transportation Center in Albuquerque

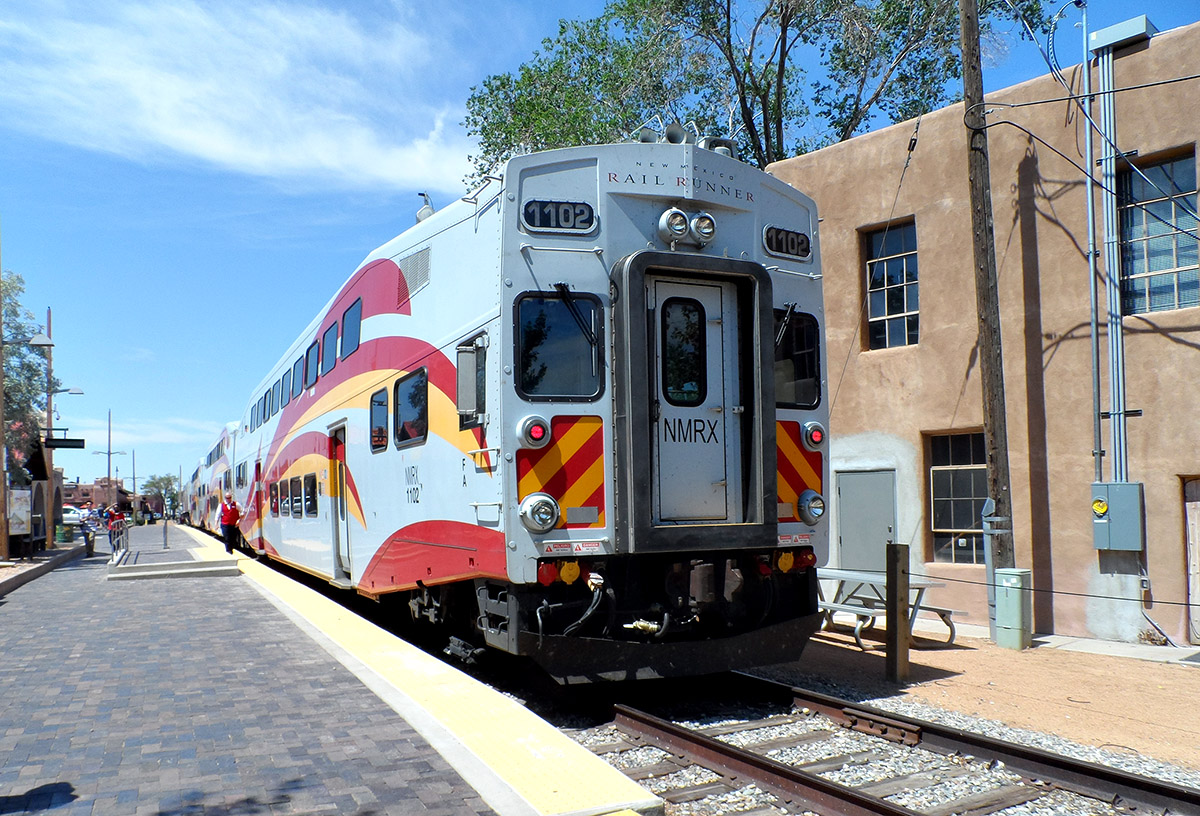
Rail Runner cab car at the Santa Fe Depot

On service between Albuquerque and Bernalillo, fares were initially free to attract ridership. On its first day of service, the Rail Runner carried 4,122 passengers. During the initial free period, ridership averaged 4,000 to 4,500 riders per day with a one-day peak of 6,000 riders. Ridership gradually declined during the weeks of free service. Ridership averaged 2,500 to 3,000 riders per day in August 2006, and 2,100 to 2,500 riders per day in September 2006.

In November 2006, free service ended on the line's Sandoval section, and ridership fell to 1,000 passengers per day. When the Los Lunas and Belen stations opened with free service, ridership rose to around 1,800 passengers per day. Free service on the Belen section of the line ended April 1, 2007, and a new zone fare structure went into effect. During the summer of 2007, ridership averaged 2,500 passengers per day. By April 2008, weekly ridership was 9,600.

On December 17, 2008, service to Santa Fe started with a three-month period of free service for Santa Fe County residents and three weekends of free service for the whole system. The original 2005 projected ridership for a slightly different (but similar speed) Phase II route to Santa Fe was 2,954 daily riders. During the first full week of train service between the two cities, more than 33,000 passengers boarded. On the second Saturday of service to Santa Fe, nearly 12,000 people boarded trains between Belen and Santa Fe. Weekend service, which was to be discontinued after the first three weekends of service to Santa Fe, was instead partly retained, with permanent Saturday service. Ridership for the first few weeks of Santa Fe service averaged about 5,000 riders per day, then dropped to an average of around 4,000 riders per day for the month of January 2009.

For four months in 2009, Rail Runner operated game-day trains to sporting events to Lobo Special Events Platform station. After a cumulative total of 227 passengers made use of Lobo, the game-day train service was discontinued and the station abandoned.

Ridership continued to increase through 2010, reaching a peak of 1.24 million passengers annually (4,000 on an average weekday). Since then, passenger numbers have continued to decline year-over-year to a low of under 770,000 in 2019.

Government analysts blamed the drop in ridership on low gas prices, infrequent service, and long travel times, and recommended that the state focus on making the service more competitive with car travel. It was also suggested that service to the Downtown Bernalillo station be reduced or eliminated due to low ridership.

== Service ==
Normal weekday service has eleven round trips: four Santa Fe–Belen round trips (one express), four Albuquerque–Belen round trips, and three Santa Fe–Albuquerque round trips. Saturday service has five northbound trips (four Belen–Santa Fe and one Belen–Albuquerque) and six southbound trips (three Santa Fe–Belen, two Albuquerque–Belen, and one Santa Fe–Albuquerque). Sunday service has three northbound trips (all Belen–Santa Fe) and four southbound trips (two Santa Fe–Belen, one Albuquerque–Belen, and one Santa Fe–Albuquerque). Additional service is provided for some events like the New Mexico Wine Festival; connecting bus shuttles run for the Balloon Fiesta. The cost of Rail Runner tickets is distance-based, with six fare zones.

=== Route ===
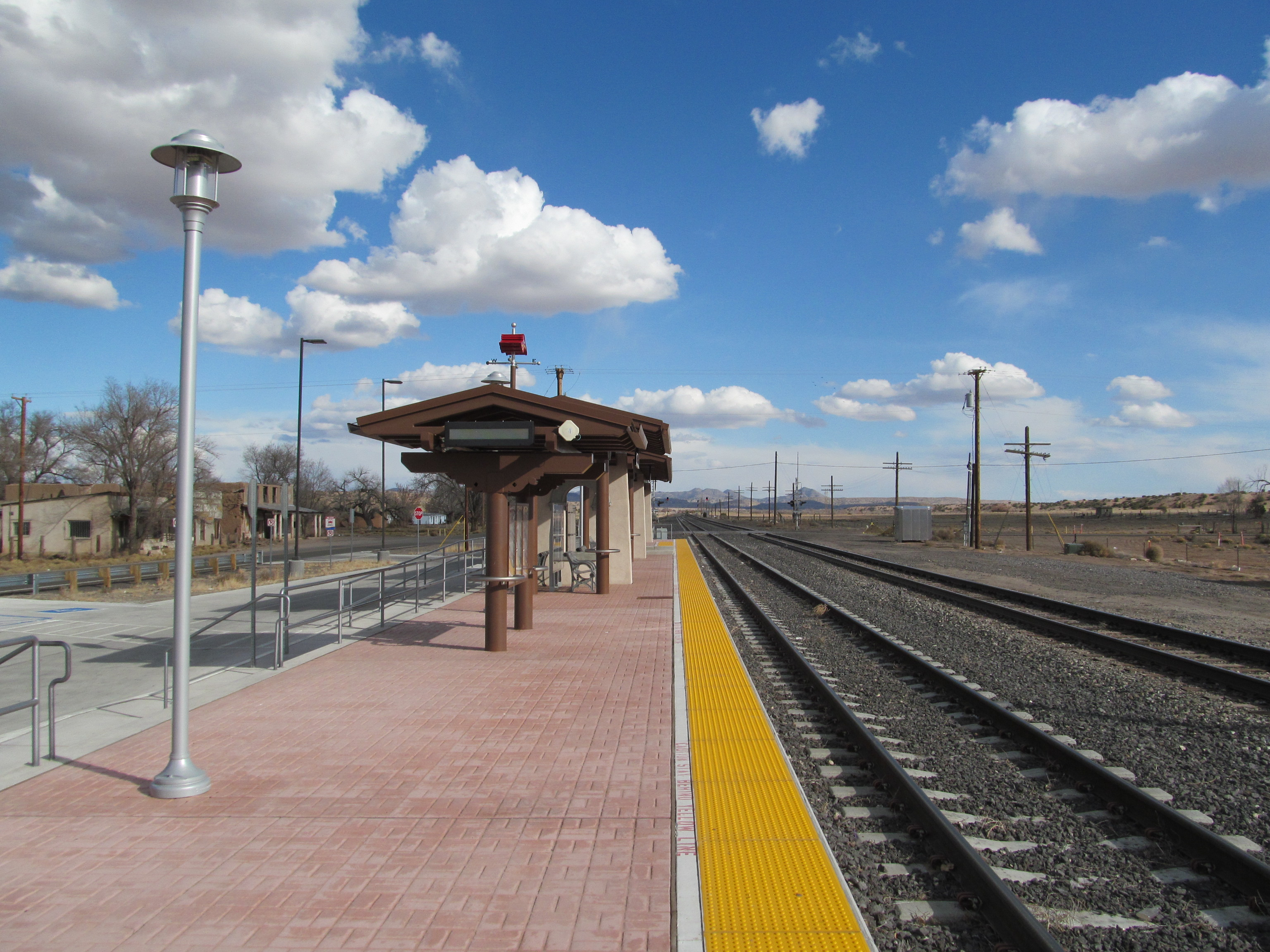
Kewa Pueblo, a typical Rail Runner station

The Rail Runner operates on a 96.5-mile (155.3 km) north–south corridor, which parallels Interstate 25. The southern 74.2 miles (119.4 km) from Belen through Albuquerque to CP Rael (northwest of Los Cerrillos) was formerly the BNSF Glorieta Subdivision and is shared with BNSF freight trains. The 17.9 miles (28.8 km) from CP Rael to CP Blewett (south of Santa Fe) largely runs in the median of Interstate 25. The northern 4.4 miles (7.1 km) into downtown Santa Fe is shared with the Santa Fe Southern Railway.

Rail Runner has 15 active stations: ten in the Albuquerque metro area, two serving Kewa Pueblo and rural areas of Santa Fe County, and three in Santa Fe. All have single side platforms 260 feet (3 cars) to 500 feet long except for South Capitol (which has two side platforms) and Downtown Albuquerque (which has longer island platforms for the Amtrak Southwest Chief). An additional station, Lobo Special Events Platform station, is unused.

=== Bus connections ===
Most stations have bus connections, including NMDOT Park and Ride shuttles (at Downtown Albuquerque, NM 599, and South Capitol), ABQRide at four stations (including Albuquerque Rapid Transit at Downtown Albuquerque), and Santa Fe Trails at the two Santa Fe stations. There are also a number of smaller shuttle services serving the Rail Runner: a shuttle to Socorro and through Belen serves the Belen station, Los Lunas Public Transportation serves the Los Lunas station, the Sandoval Easy Express serves the two stations in Bernalillo, the University of New Mexico has a dedicated shuttle connecting its main campus to the Downtown Albuquerque station, a shuttle to Taos serves the Santa Fe Depot and South Capitol stations, and Santa Ana Pueblo, Isleta Pueblo, and Pojoaque Pueblo each operate shuttles connecting their casinos to the nearest Rail Runner station.

== Rolling stock ==
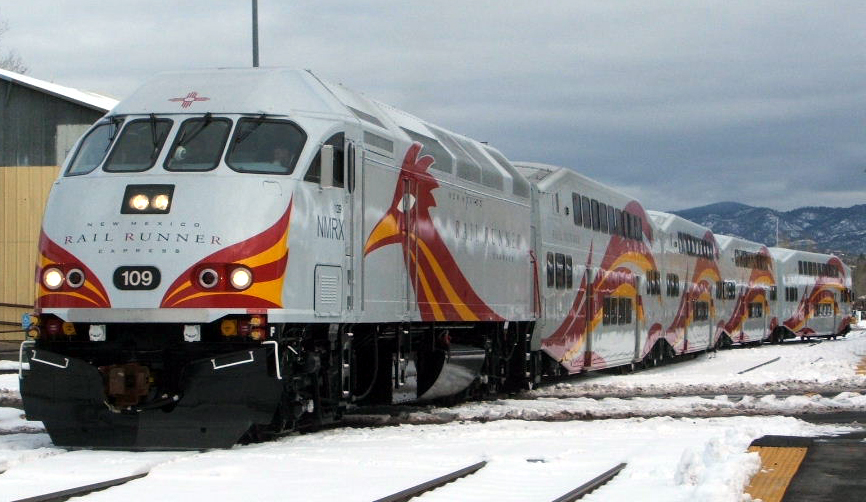
A Rail Runner trainset in 2008

The Rail Runner power includes nine MotivePower MPI MP36PH-3C diesel-electric locomotives, thirteen Bombardier BiLevel Coaches and nine Bombardier BiLevel Cab cars. Coach cars have a seating capacity of 151 passengers while cab cars have a seating capacity of 141 passengers, The livery of the New Mexico Rail Runner depicts a stylistic roadrunner on the locomotive and trailing tailfeathers on the coaches. The "door closing" tones resemble the signature "Beep-Beep" of the Warner Bros. Road Runner cartoon character. Trains operate in a push-pull configuration, with the locomotive always facing south. When not in use, the vehicles are stored in a rail yard in downtown Albuquerque near the Alvarado Transportation Center.

Manufacturer	Model	Inventory	Numbers
MotivePower	MPI MP36PH-3C diesel-electric locomotive	9	101–109
Bombardier Transportation	Bombardier BiLevel Coach	13	1001–1013
Bombardier Transportation	Bombardier BiLevel Cab cars	9	1101–1109
