= Belen station =

Train stop in New Mexico

Belen
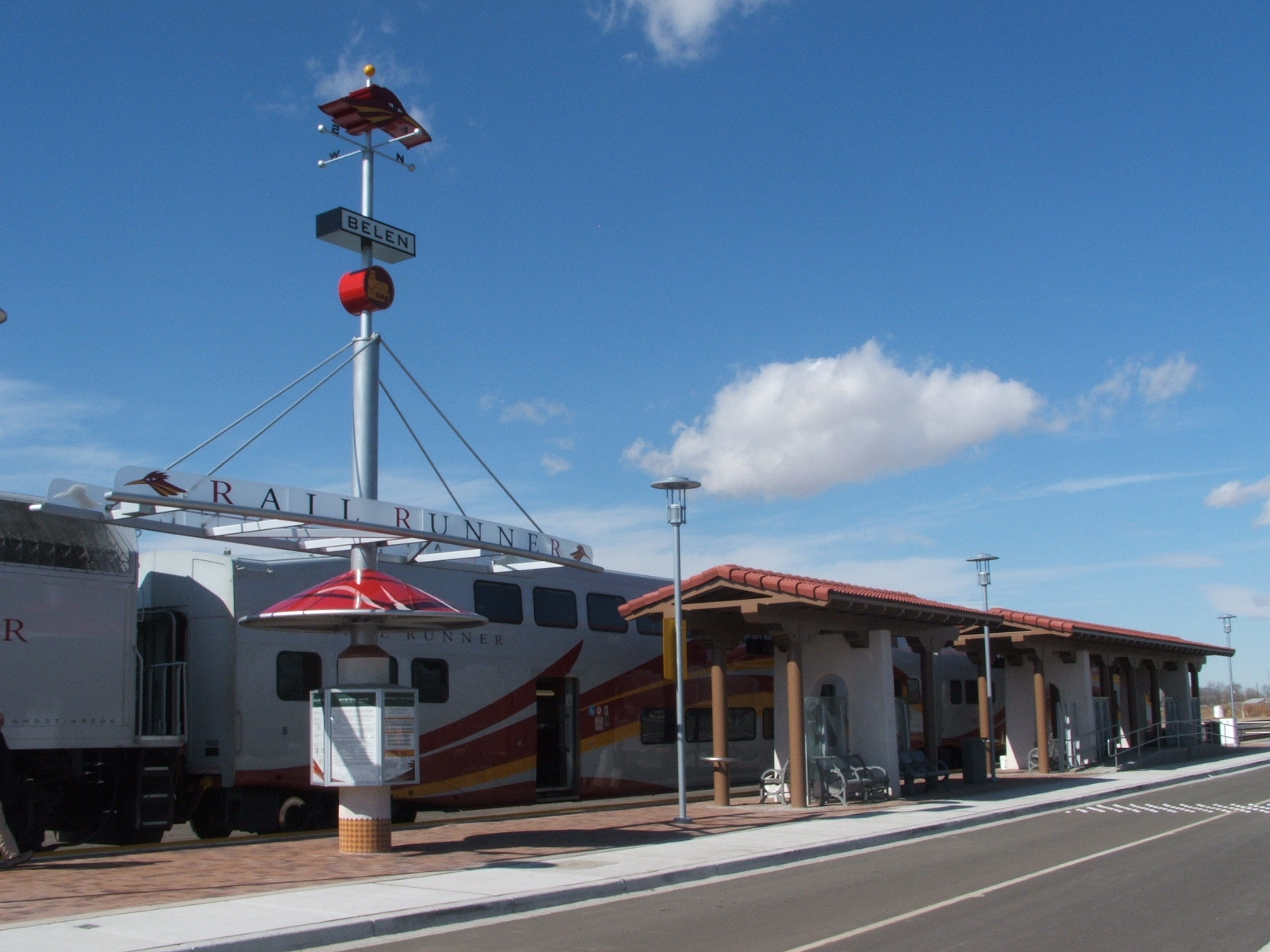

General information
- Location: 100 Rail Runner Drive, Belen, New Mexico
- Coordinates: 34°39′48″N 106°45′59″W
- Platforms: 1 side platform
- Tracks: 1

Construction
- Parking: 220 spaces
- Accessible: yes

Other information
- Fare zone: Zone A

History
- Opened: February 2, 2007

Services
Preceding station	New Mexico Rail Runner Express	Following station
Terminus	Rail Runner Express	Los Lunas toward Santa Fe Depot
Location

Belen is the southern terminus of the New Mexico Rail Runner Express commuter rail line, located in the center of the town of Belen, New Mexico, near the intersection of Reinken Avenue and Wisconsin Street. It serves residents of Belen and surrounding communities in Valencia County, New Mexico. The station began service on February 2, 2007, as the fifth station on the line.

Earlier, as recent as 1966, the Atchison, Topeka & Santa Fe operated a passenger train from Albuquerque, through Belen, to El Paso. Belen would have been part of an Amtrak passenger train from Los Angeles, California to Atlanta, Georgia that was never started.

Passengers can connect to shuttles serving Belen, Rio Communities, and Socorro. The station has free parking, with 220 spaces.

Each of the Rail Runner stations contains an icon to express each community's identity. The icon representing this station is the Harvey House in Belen, which is within walking distance of the station.
