= West Las Vegas High School =

Location
- 157 Moreno Street; Las Vegas, New Mexico 87701; United States

Information
- Type: Public high school
- Established: 1947: New Town High; 1955: West Las Vegas High
- Principal: Carla Pacheco
- Teaching staff: 26.06 (FTE)
- Enrollment: 406 (2023–2024)
- Student to teacher ratio: 15.58
- Campus: Downtown
- Colors: Green and Gold
- Athletics conference: NMAA, District 2-AAA
- Mascot: Don and Lady Don
- Rival: Robertson High School
- Website: hs.wlvs.k12.nm.us

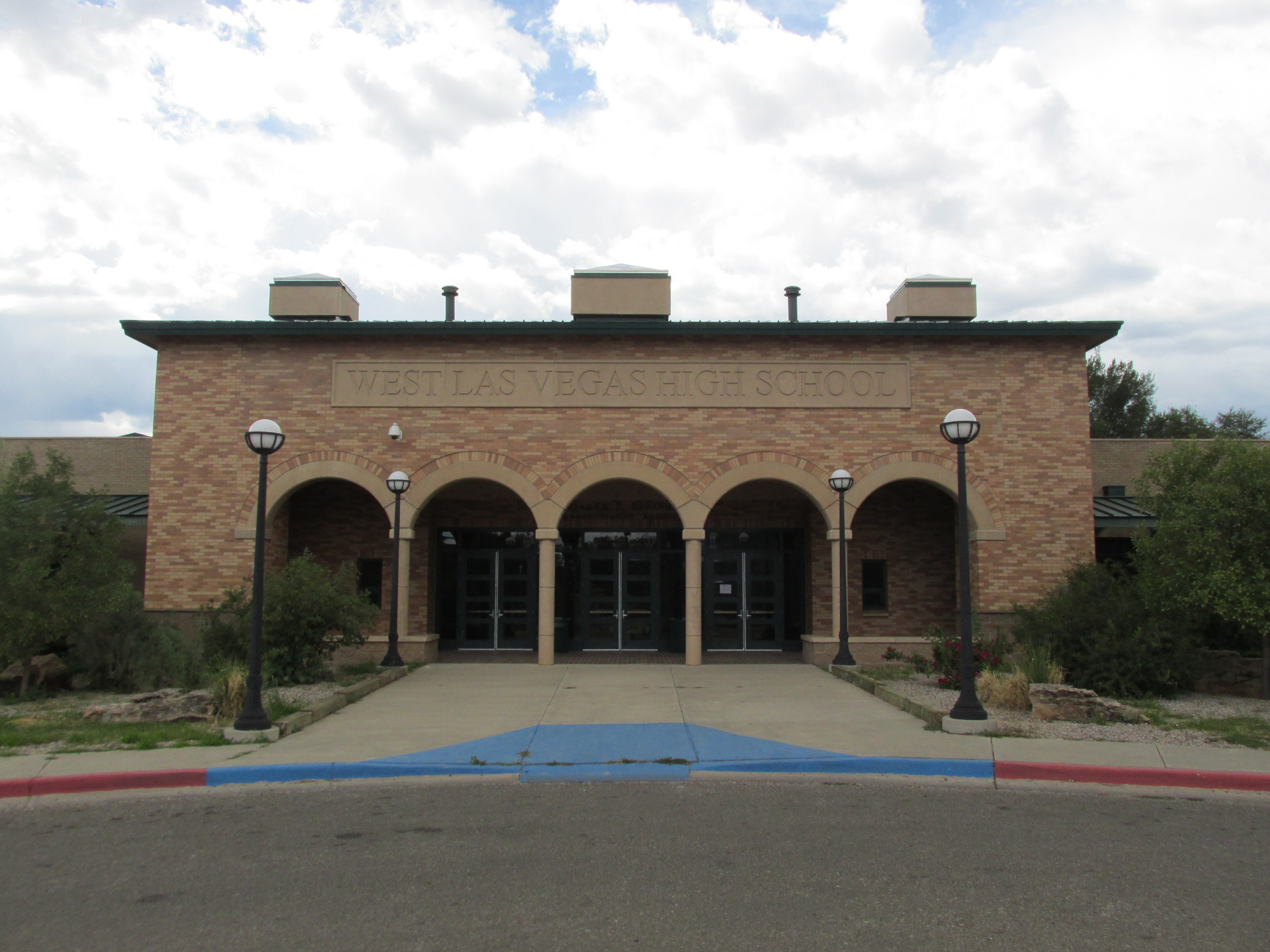
West Las Vegas High School

West Las Vegas High School (WLVHS) is a public senior high school in Las Vegas, New Mexico and the only such high school in the West Las Vegas Schools District. Founded in 1947, it is the oldest high school in the city.

The mascot of WLVHS is the Don, and the school's colors are Green and Gold. As of 2022, enrollment at the school is 413 students.

The boundary of the school district, effectively that of the high school, includes western Las Vegas and Pueblo, Ribera, San Jose, Sena, Tecolote, and Villanueva.

== Academics ==
=== Student body statistics ===
Ethnicity	This School	Statewide
Hispanic (of any race)	91%	62%
White (not hispanic)	8%	23%
American Indian/Alaskan Native	<1%	10%
African American	<1%	2%
Two or More Races	<1%	2%
Asian	0%	1%

== Athletics ==
WLVHS competes in the New Mexico Activities Association as a AAA school in District 2. Their district includes: Raton High School, Robertson High School, Santa Fe Indian School, Santa Fe Preparatory School and St. Michaels High School.

WLVHS has won 20 State Championships since 1968.

State Championships			
Season	Sport	Number of Championships	Year
Spring	Boys, Small Team Tennis	1	2009
Spring	Girls, Golf	2	1996, 1999
Spring	Softball	2	2024, 2026
Spring	Baseball	2	1968, 1978
Spring	Cheer	6	2003, 2005, 2015, 2017, 2018, 2019
Winter	Choir	3	2008, 2009, 2011
Winter	Esports	3	2023, 2024, 2025
Winter	Wrestling	1	2022
Total		20	

== Notable alumni ==
- Ambrose Castellano, member of the New Mexico House of Representatives
- Teresa Leger Fernandez, attorney and member of the US House of Representatives from New Mexico's 3rd District
- Ray Leger, educator and former member of the New Mexico Senate
- Simon Romero, international correspondent for The New York Times
