= NMDOT Park and Ride =

Overview
- Owner: New Mexico Department of Transportation
- Area served: New Mexico, El Paso
- Transit type: Express bus
- Number of lines: 11
- Daily ridership: 1,258
- Annual ridership: 315,738
- Website: http://nmparkandride.com/

Operation
- Began operation: 2003
- Operator: All Aboard America
- Number of vehicles: 23
System map
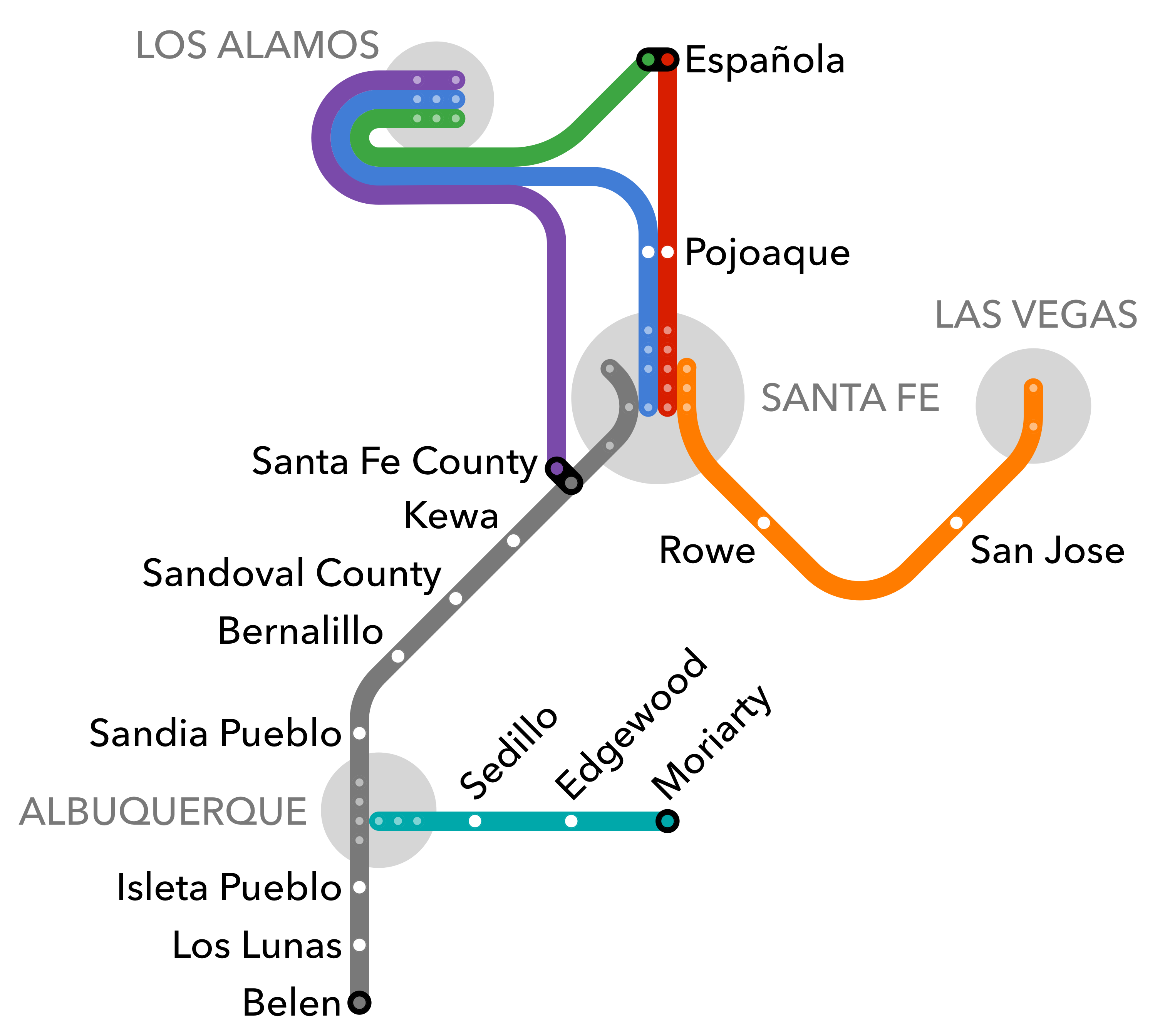

NMDOT Park and Ride is the name given to a network of intercity buses in New Mexico and Texas, operated by the New Mexico Department of Transportation. The network is composed of eleven routes, including eight intercity routes and three local shuttle routes in Santa Fe, New Mexico. It is the fifth largest public bus transit operation in New Mexico based on ridership, with a yearly ridership of 315,738 for 2014. Service is provided in the morning and evening peak hours, with no service during midday, and buses operate on weekdays only.

== History ==
NMDOT Park and Ride began service in 2003, operating the Blue, Green and Red routes. Service began on the Purple route – then serving Santa Fe and Albuquerque – a few months after. In the following years, Park and Ride expanded service even further, opening the Orange, Silver and Turquoise routes. In 2008, the New Mexico Rail Runner Express was extended to Santa Fe, and so the Purple route was rerouted as an express between Los Alamos and the NM 599 Rail Runner station. The most recent route on the system, the Gold Route, was opened in 2009, marking the first extension of the network into Texas.

In 2015, Park and Ride launched "P&RealTime", which allows passengers to track real-time bus locations online, which can be set up to give alerts during service disruptions.

== Routes ==
Currently, Park and Ride operates six routes in its northern network, two routes on its southern network, and two local routes in Santa Fe to connect passengers to the Rail Runner.

=== Northern Routes ===
Blue Route: serving Santa Fe, Pojoaque and Los Alamos

Green Route: serving Española and Los Alamos

Red Route: serving Santa Fe, Pojoaque and Española

Orange Route: serving Santa Fe, Rowe, San Jose and Las Vegas.

Purple Route: serving Los Alamos and the NM 599 Station, as well as one morning trip from Albuquerque.

Turquoise Route: serving Albuquerque, Sedillo, Edgewood and Moriarty.

=== Southern routes ===
Gold Route: serving Las Cruces, Anthony and El Paso.

Silver Route: serving Las Cruces and White Sands Missile Range.

=== Santa Fe shuttles ===
South Capitol Station shuttle: connecting destinations in Santa Fe to the Rail Runner at South Capitol Station.

NM 599 Station shuttle: connecting destinations in Santa Fe to the Rail Runner at NM 599 Station.

Purple shuttle: connecting from the Purple Route's Albuquerque run to serve South Capitol Station and Santa Fe Depot.
