= Robertson High School =

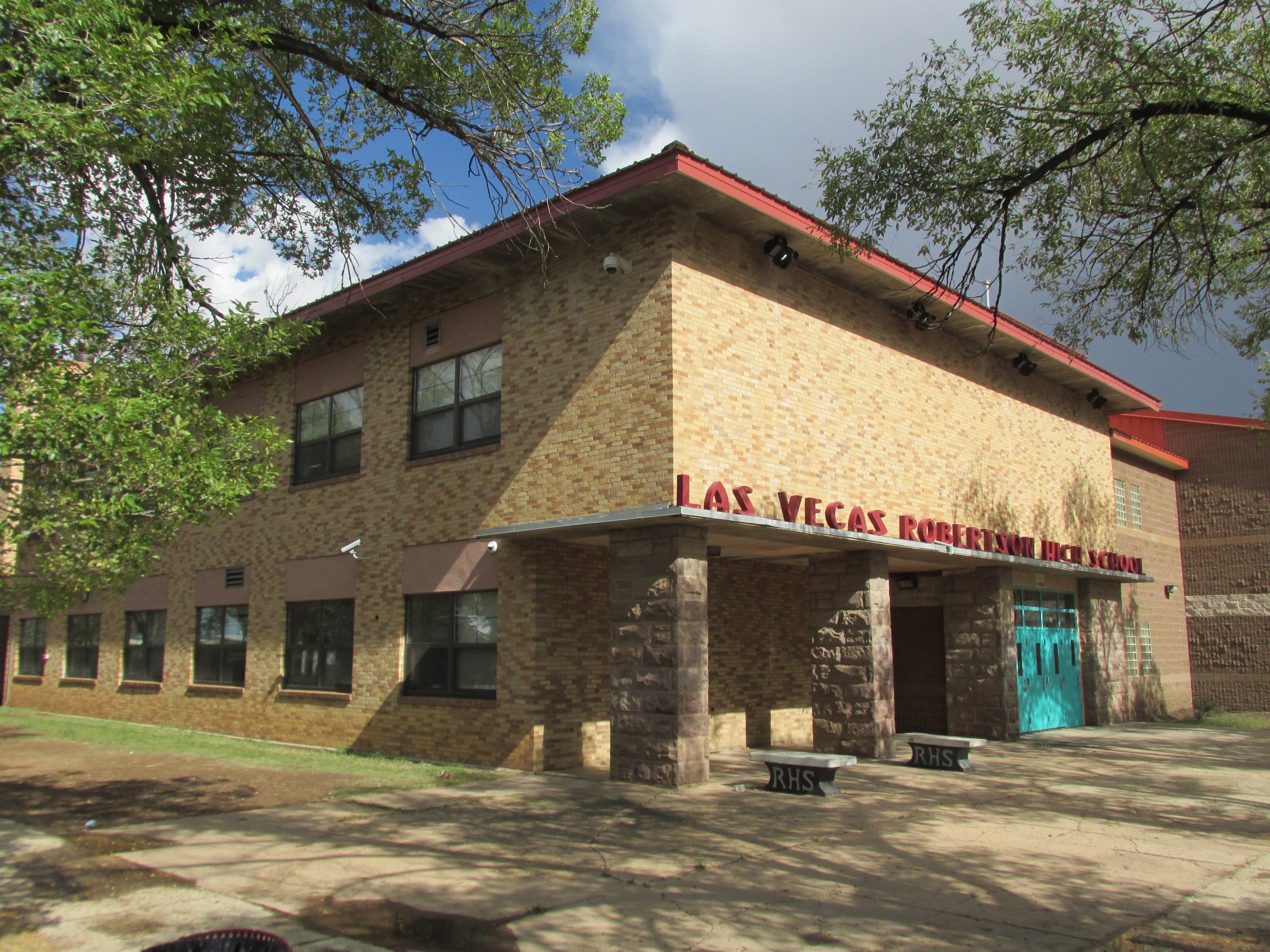
- Robertson High School

Location
- 1236 5th Street; Las Vegas, New Mexico 87701; United States

Information
- Type: Public high school
- Established: 1958; 68 years ago
- School district: Las Vegas City Schools
- Principal: Mike Yara
- Teaching staff: 28.50 (FTE)
- Enrollment: 350 (2023–2024)
- Student to teacher ratio: 12.28
- Campus type: Suburban
- Colors: Red and White
- Athletics conference: NMAA, District 2-AAA
- Mascot: Cardinal
- Rival: West Las Vegas High School
- Website: robertson.cybercardinal.com

Robertson High School (RHS) is a public senior high school in Las Vegas, New Mexico, United States. The school is part of the Las Vegas City Schools District in former East Las Vegas. The building dates from about 1945, when it was known as Las Vegas High School. The school was renamed Las Vegas Robertson High School in 1958, after the old Las Vegas High School burned down and a new building was constructed. W. J. Robertson had been the superintendent of the Las Vegas City Schools since 1941 when he suffered a fatal heart attack on November 26, 1956, at the age of 55. Mr. Robertson, born in Kansas on November 3, 1901, also served as principal at Las Vegas High School for many years prior. The colors of RHS are red and white, their mascot is the Cardinal. The enrollment currently stands at 414.

The attendance boundary of the school district, effectively that of the high school, includes eastern sections of Las Vegas, and Watrous.

== Academics ==
=== Student body statistics ===
Ethnicity	This school	State average
Hispanic (of any race)	69%	56%
White (not hispanic)	30%	29%
American Indian/Alaskan Native	1%	11%
African American	<1%	3%
Pacific Islander	<1%	1%

== Athletics ==
RHS competes in the New Mexico Activities Association, District 2-AAA. Their district includes: Raton High School, St. Michael's High School, Santa Fe Indian School, Santa Fe Preparatory School and West Las Vegas High School.

RHS has won 34 State Championships since 1969.

State Championships
Season	Sport	Number of Championships	Year
Fall	Football	4	2005, 2006, 2013, 2021
Fall	Boys Cross Country	1	1969
Fall	Girls Cross Country	2	2003, 2018
Fall	Girls Volleyball	1	2019
Winter	Wrestling	8	2001, 2002, 2003, 2006, 2007, 2008, 2009, 2015
Winter	Spirit/Cheer	3	1998, 1999, 2006
Winter	Girls Basketball	2	2019, 2022
Spring	Boys Tennis	6	1972, 2003, 2006, 2007, 2015, 2017
Spring	Girls Tennis	6	2011, 2014, 2015, 2016, 2017, 2018
Spring	Boys Track and Field	1	1972
Spring	Girls Track and Field	1	1987
Spring	Boys Baseball	1	2019
Total		36	
