= New Mexico Department of Transportation =

State government agency in New Mexico, United States

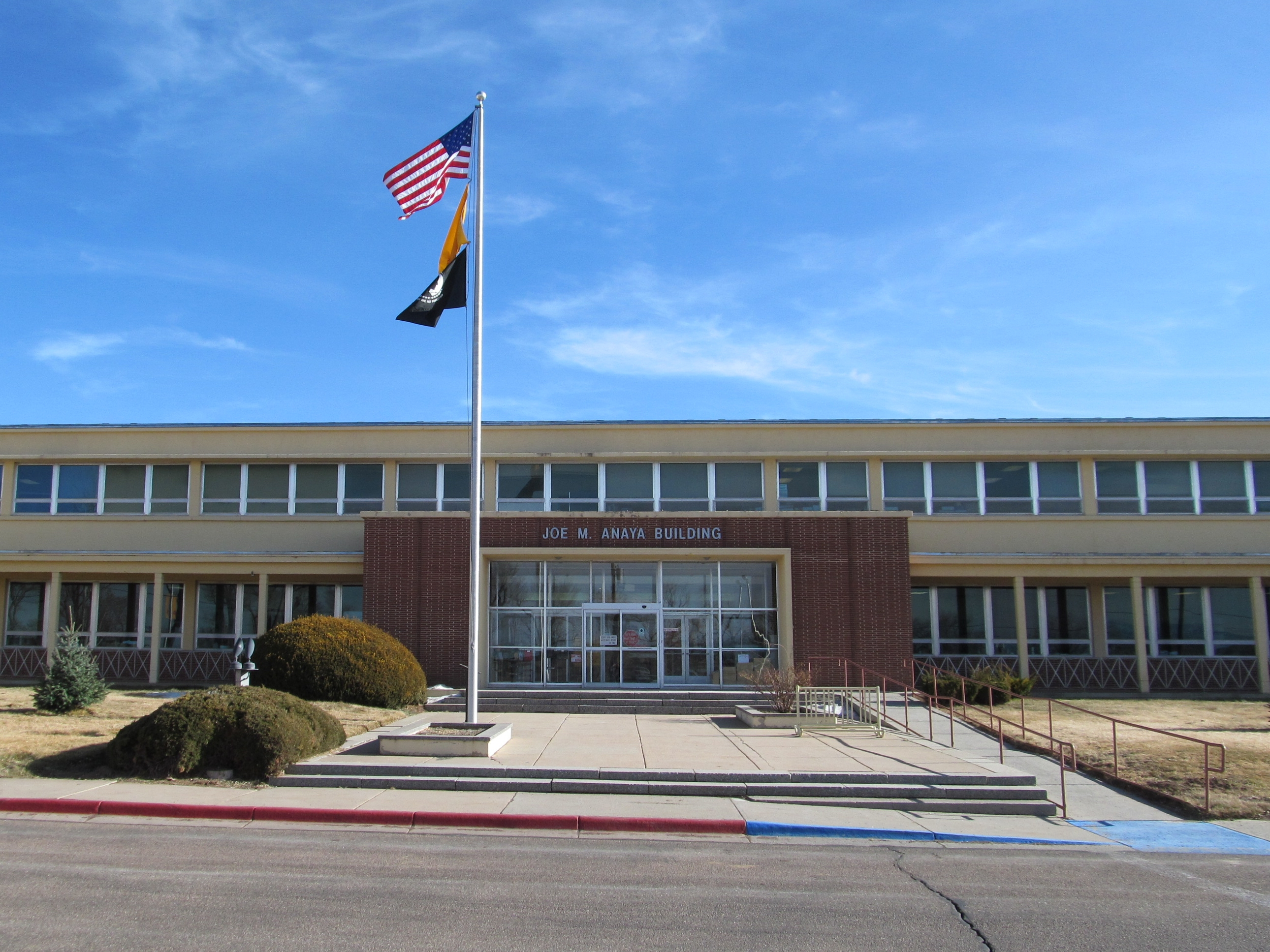
- Joe M. Anaya Building

Agency overview
- Jurisdiction: New Mexico
- Headquarters: 1120 Cerrillos Road, Santa Fe, New Mexico
- Agency executives: Cabinet Secretary; Ricky Serna
- Parent agency: State of New Mexico
- Website: dot.nm.gov

The New Mexico Department of Transportation (NMDOT; Spanish: Departamento de Transporte de Nuevo México) is a state government organization which oversees transportation in State of New Mexico in the southwestern United States. The agency has four main focuses—transit, rail, aviation and highways. The department is based in the Joe M. Anaya Building in Santa Fe.

== NMDOT Districts ==
The NMDOT is divided into six districts which serve various areas of the state:

District	Area served
District One	southwest New Mexico
District Two	Roswell area
District Three	Albuquerque area
District Four	Las Vegas area
District Five	Santa Fe area
District Six	Milan area

== NMDOT Park and Ride ==
Beginning in 2003, the NMDOT began operating intercity bus service in New Mexico and Texas, under the name NMDOT Park and Ride. The system includes eight intercity routes and three local routes in Santa Fe.
