= Raton High School =

Coordinates: 36°53′13″N 104°27′05″W

Location
- 1535 Tiger Circle; Raton, New Mexico; United States

Information
- Type: Public high school
- Founded: 1891
- School district: Raton Public Schools
- Superintendent: Kristie Medina
- Principal: Joleene Starr
- Staff: 25.21 (FTE)
- Grades: 7-12
- Enrollment: 359 (2022–23)
- Student to teacher ratio: 14.24
- Campus: Rural
- Colors: Black and gold
- Athletics conference: NMAA, District 2-AAA
- Mascot: Tiger
- Yearbook: El Tigre
- Website: ratonschools.com

Raton High School (RHS) is a public senior high school in Raton, New Mexico. It is a part of the Raton Public Schools district.

== History ==
In 1891, the New Mexico Territorial Legislature approved taxes for the purpose of creating statewide public schools. The act was responsible for creating funding for the state's first high schools. With this act Raton High School was formed as one of the original four along with high schools in Albuquerque, Las Vegas and Silver City.

== Athletics ==
Raton High School has been a member of the NMAA since it organized in 1921.

The Raton Tigers are current members of NMAA's District 2-AAA along with Santa Fe Indian School, Santa Fe Preparatory School, Robertson High School, West Las Vegas High School and St. Michael's High School.

RHS athletic districts	Year:
1	1930–1953
2-A	1954–1969
2-AAA	1970–present

Boys' baseball: State AAA Champions 2007

Boys' basketball: The Raton Tigers were New Mexico State champions in 1929, 1932 and 1936

Football: The Raton Tigers were New Mexico State champions in 1956. They were the state runner-up in 1953, 1957, 1962, 1992 and 1996.

== Notable alumni ==
- Harry E. Kinney, Mayor of Albuquerque
- Paul L. Modrich, biochemistry professor
