= Santo Domingo Indian Trading Post =

- U.S. National Register of Historic Places
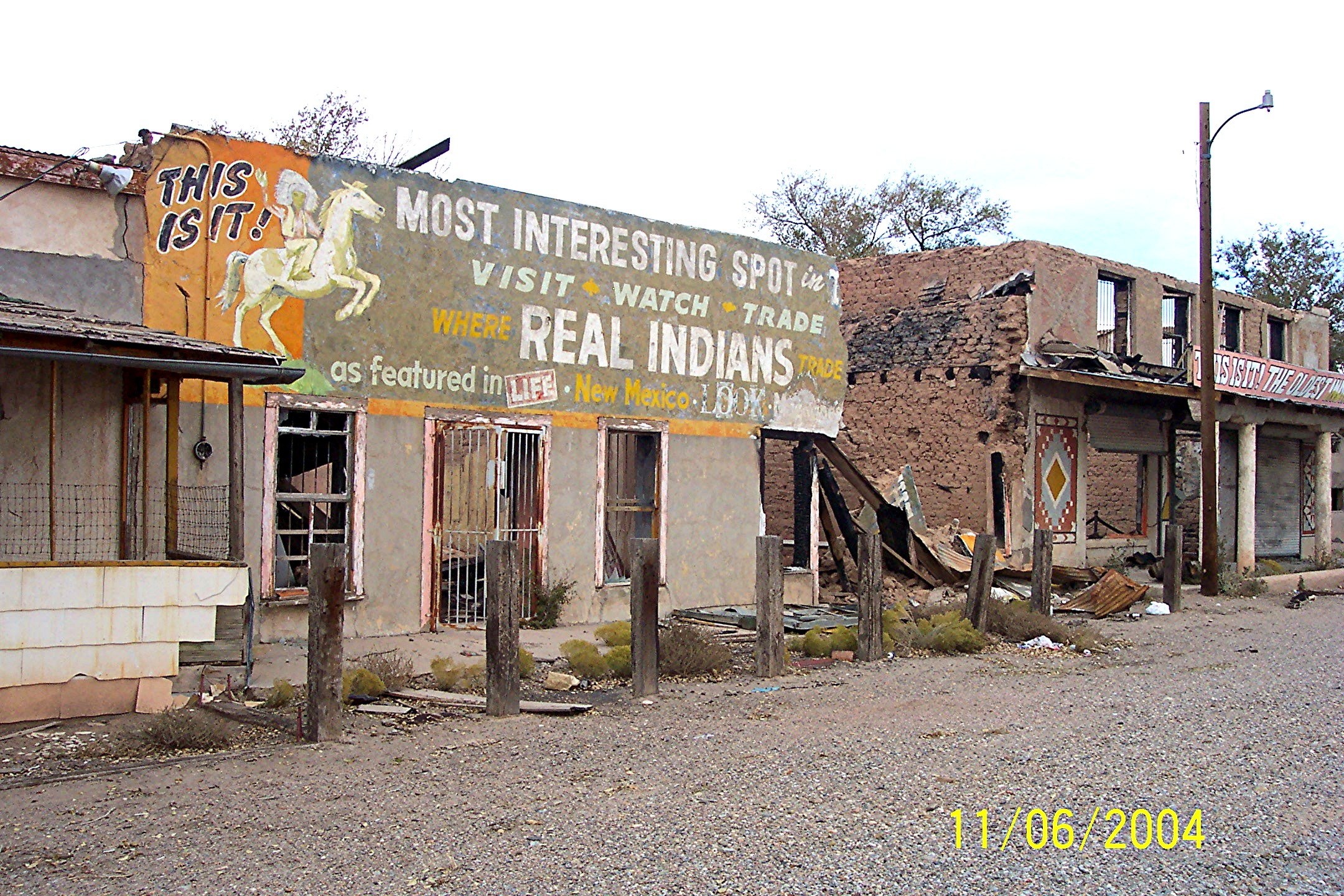

- Location within New Mexico
- Location: Rt. 66 crossing of AT&SF RR tracks at Domingo, Domingo, New Mexico
- Coordinates: 35.511504°N 106.320927°W
- Area: less than one acre
- Built: 1922
- Built by: Seligman family
- Architectural style: Mission/spanish Revival, Southwest Vernacular
- MPS: Route 66 through New Mexico MPS
- NRHP reference No.: 97001592
- Added to NRHP: January 9, 1998

The Santo Domingo Indian Trading Post, at Domingo, New Mexico on Santo Domingo Pueblo land dates from 1922. It was listed on the National Register of Historic Places in 1998.

It is a complex of three adjoining buildings, the oldest being the northernmost which was built in 1922 and operated as a trading post until it was closed in 1995. It replaced use of an 1880-built building.

It is located at the former U.S. Route 66 crossing of the Atchison, Topeka and Santa Fe Railway railroad tracks at Domingo. The old Santa Fe-Albuquerque highway passed directly in front and became part of the alignment of the new Route 66 and Route 85 in 1926. The routes were realigned two miles to the east in 1932.

It is across the street from what is now the Kewa Pueblo (Rail Runner station), on Indian Service Route 88.

It was built by the Seligman family and is Mission/Spanish Revival and Southwest Vernacular in style.
