= Kewa station =

Commuter train station in Kewa Pueblo, New Mexico, United States

Kewa
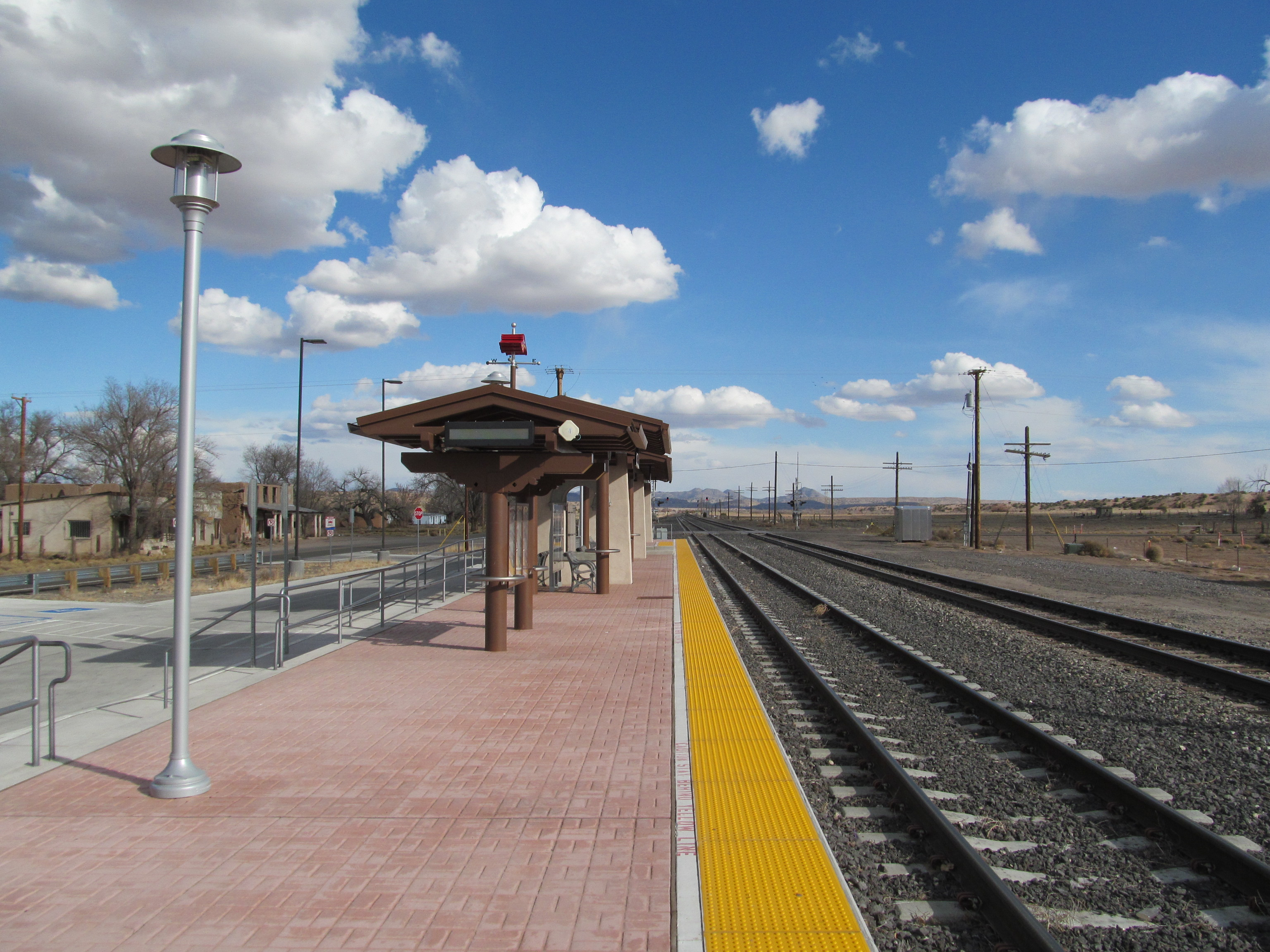

General information
- Location: Indian Service Route 88
- Coordinates: 35.5111290°N 106.3218860°W
- Platforms: 1 side platform
- Tracks: 2

Construction
- Parking: 40 spaces
- Accessible: yes

Other information
- Fare zone: Zone D

Services
Preceding station	New Mexico Rail Runner Express	Following station
Sandoval County/US 550 toward Belen	Rail Runner Express	Santa Fe County/NM 599 toward Santa Fe Depot
Location

Kewa Pueblo is a station on the New Mexico Rail Runner Express commuter rail line, located in Kewa Pueblo on Indian Service Route 88. It opened on March 22, 2010.

The station has free parking, with 40 spaces. Rio Metro Regional Transit District provides a bus connection on the Sandoval Easy Express Route 22 which connects the station with Kewa Pueblo, Cochiti Pueblo, Santa Ana Pueblo, Pena Blanca, Algodones and Bernalillo.

Each of the Rail Runner stations contains an icon to express each community's identity. The icon representing Kewa Pueblo station is the old Santo Domingo Indian Trading Post. The trading post burnt down in 2001 and is now being restored.
