= West Las Vegas Schools =

New Mexico school district

Coordinates: 35.5936°N 105.2257°W

Location
- Las Vegas, New Mexico United States

District information
- Type: Public
- Grades: K-12
- Superintendent: Mr. Christopher Gutierrez

Students and staff
- Students: 1,609
- Colors: Green/Gold

Other information
- Website: www.wlvs.k12.nm.us

West Las Vegas Public Schools is a school district based in Las Vegas, New Mexico, United States.

The district covers a 3,065-square-mile (7,940 km^{2}) area in southern San Miguel County.

Within the city of Las Vegas, the district serves areas located west of the Gallinas River. Other communities in the district include Pueblo, Ribera, San Jose, Sena, Tecolote, and Villanueva.

== History ==
Las Vegas, New Mexico, was historically two separate settlements divided by the Gallinas River: "Old Town" (West Las Vegas), dating to an 1835 Mexican land grant, and "New Town" (East Las Vegas), which developed after the Atchison, Topeka and Santa Fe Railway arrived in 1879. The two communities maintained separate municipal governments, and separate school systems, even after they were consolidated into a single city government in 1970. West Las Vegas Schools serves the area west of the river, while Las Vegas City Schools serves the area to the east.

In 1972, the district offered to provide bus transportation to students from Anton Chico, a community in the Santa Rosa Consolidated Schools district whose middle school had closed. The district asked the State of New Mexico to fund the transportation costs, but the New Mexico State Board of Education denied the request in January 1973.

A case study by the Southwest Educational Development Laboratory noted periodic public discussion of merging West Las Vegas Schools and Las Vegas City Schools into a single district to reduce costs and improve services, though no merger has occurred.

== Governance ==
The district is governed by an elected Board of Education, with seats filled through at-large local school board elections. In the November 2023 election, board chairman Rolan Medrano Jr. was re-elected to a second term, joined by newcomers Christopher Lopez and Gabriel Salazar.

As of 2026, Christopher Gutierrez serves as superintendent, with Darice Balizan as associate superintendent. The district's administration offices are located in the Donaldo A. Martinez Administration Building in Las Vegas.

== 2026 budget deficits and Valley Schools closure proposal ==
In 2026, the district began public discussion of consolidating or closing its Ribera-area schools – Valley Elementary School, Valley Middle School, and West Las Vegas Family Partnership – citing declining enrollment and budget shortfalls. District administrators reported that Valley Elementary operated at a deficit of roughly $246,000 in fiscal year 2024 and $286,000 in fiscal year 2025, that Valley Middle School operated at a deficit of roughly $367,000 in fiscal year 2024 and $261,000 in fiscal year 2025, and that West Las Vegas Family Partnership had a fiscal year 2025 deficit of roughly $67,000.

Associate superintendent Darice Balizan said the closure idea was first raised at an April 14, 2026, special board meeting held for 2026-2027 budget development, and that a subsequent May 6 community meeting was intended to gather feedback rather than announce a decision. As of that meeting, no decision on closures or restructuring has been made.

== Schools ==
=== High school ===
- Grades 9-12
  - West Las Vegas High School

=== Middle schools ===
- Grades 6-8
  - Valley Middle School
  - West Las Vegas Middle School

=== Elementary schools ===
- Grades 2-5
  - Don Cecilio Martinez Elementary School
  - Tony Serna Jr. Elementary School
  - Union Street Elementary School
- Grades K-5
  - Valley Elementary School
- Grades K-1
  - Luis E. Armijo Elementary School

=== Other Campuses ===
- West Las Vegas Family Partnership
  - High School Site (Grades 7–12)
- Rio Gallinas School (Grades 1–8)

== Enrollment ==
- 2007-2008 School Year: 1,795 students
- 2006-2007 School Year: 1,832 students
- 2005-2006 School Year: 2,001 students
- 2004-2005 School Year: 1,952 students
- 2003-2004 School Year: 1,999 students
- 2002-2003 School Year: 2,056 students
- 2001-2002 School Year: 2,080 students
- 2000-2001 School Year: 2,111 students

== Demographics ==
As of the 2024-2025 school year, West Las Vegas Public Schools enrolled 1,609 students across its 10 schools, with 116.85 classroom teachers (full-time equivalent) and a student/teacher ratio of 13.77:1.

There were a total of 1,795 students enrolled in West Las Vegas Public Schools during the 2007–2008 school year. The gender makeup of the district was 48.30% female and 51.70% male. The racial makeup of the district was 92.53% Hispanic, 5.68% White, 1.06% African American, 0.61% Native American, and 0.11% Asian/Pacific Islander.

== See also ==
- List of school districts in New Mexico
- Las Vegas City Schools - a district serving areas of Las Vegas located east of the Gallinas River.
