= Las Vegas City Schools =

School district based in Las Vegas, New Mexico, U.S.

Location
- Las Vegas, New Mexico United States

District information
- Type: Public
- Grades: K-12
- Superintendent: L. Larryssa Archuleta

Students and staff
- District mascot: Cardinal
- Colors: Red and white

Other information
- Website: cybercardinal.com

Las Vegas City Schools is a school district based in Las Vegas, New Mexico, United States.

The district covers a 1,261-square-mile (3,270 km^{2}) area in northern San Miguel County.

Within the city of Las Vegas, the district serves areas located east of the Gallinas River. The district extends to Mora County, where it includes Watrous.

== Schools ==
- High school
  - Robertson High School
- Middle School
  - Memorial Middle School
- Elementary Schools
  - Los Niños Elementary School
  - Mike "Mateo" Sena Elementary School
  - Sierra Vista Elementary School

== Enrollment ==
- 2007-2008 School Year: 2,122 students
- 2006-2007 School Year: 2,102 students
- 2005-2006 School Year: 2,109 students
- 2004-2005 School Year: 2,153 students
- 2003-2004 School Year: 2,200 students
- 2002-2003 School Year: 2,277 students
- 2001-2002 School Year: 2,406 students
- 2000-2001 School Year: 2,497 students

== Demographics ==
There were a total of 2,122 students enrolled in Las Vegas City Public Schools during the 2007–2008 school year. The gender makeup of the district was 49.91% female and 50.09% male. The racial makeup of the district was 86.43% Hispanic, 11.03% White, 1.23% Asian/Pacific Islander, 0.85% Native American, and 0.46% African American.

== See also ==
- List of school districts in New Mexico
- West Las Vegas Schools - a district serving areas of Las Vegas located west of the Gallinas River.
