= Margaret Herrera Chávez =

American painter and printmaker

Margaret Herrera Chávez (1912–1992) was an American painter and printmaker.

Born in Las Vegas, New Mexico, Chávez was the daughter of ranchers, and grew up in Gascon, in Mora County. She was one of the know handful of documented New Mexican artist, working locally from the 1950's through the 1960's. Open to experiment with her art, she worked with an abundant amount of media such as prints, watercolors, oils, ceramics, textiles and sculpture. Through the usage of her fluid line work and use of vibrant colors, she captured the reality and fantasy of the urban and rural landscapes of New Mexico. Worked as an elementary schoolteacher and for the Works Progress Administration, and sometimes exhibited her work under the name Mrs. Paul Chávez. She won multiple prizes for her work exhibited at the Museum of Fine Arts during her life and was one of only two female artists featured in Jacinto Quirarte's book, Mexican American Artists. Her works are in the permanent collections of the New Mexico Museum of Art, Museum of International Folk Art and Highlands University.

== Style and work ==
Chávez was a self-taught artist who painted primarily in watercolor and oils, and also practiced printmaking. She later completed formal training at Highlands University, Las Vegas; The University of New Mexico, Albuquerque; and the Instituto San Miguel de Allende, Guanajuato, Mexico.

After World War II, Chávez taught in the Albuquerque Public School system while working on her own art. Working in Albuquerque at this time "meant that she was part of the avant-garde that shifted away from the art colonies of the north [Santa Fe art colony and Taos art colony] and engaged with the art scene in Albuquerque" where artists such as Raymond Johnson, Richard Diebenkorn, John Taschl, and Kenneth Miller Adams were located.

The landscape of northern New Mexico where she grew up provided inspiration for much of her work, which consisted primarily of broad views of landscapes painted in light colors. Her affiliation with the Works Progress Administration and New Deal art projects also influenced her style.

== Activism ==
Chávez promoted the work of New Mexican women artists through her membership in the National League of American Pen Women (NLAPW), during which she served as president of the Albuquerque branch and chair of the New Mexico State Art Committee. She also belonged to the Hispanic Cultural Society, New Mexico Education Association, and the National Education Association.
