= Sena, New Mexico =

Unincorporated community in New Mexico, United States

- Unincorporated community
- Location within the state of New Mexico
- Coordinates: 35°18′22″N 105°22′42″W
- Country: United States
- State: New Mexico
- County: San Miguel

Area
  - Total: 2.13 sq mi (5.51 km^{2})
  - Land: 2.13 sq mi (5.51 km^{2})
  - Water: 0 sq mi (0.00 km^{2})
- Elevation: 5,876 ft (1,791 m)

Population (2020)
  - Total: 155
  - Density: 72.9/sq mi (28.15/km^{2})
- Time zone: UTC-7 (MST)
  - Summer (DST): UTC-6 (MDT)
- Area code: 505
- FIPS code: 35-71790
- GNIS ID: 2584218

Sena is an unincorporated community and census-designated place in San Miguel County, New Mexico, United States. As of the 2020 census, Sena had a population of 155. It is located along the Pecos River and New Mexico State Highway 3.

== History ==
Sena was founded in the 19th century.

== Economy ==
Sena has no commercial enterprises of its own. The nearest store and Post Office is 3.2 miles (5.1 km) southeast, in the community of Villanueva.

== Demographics ==
Historical population
| Census | Pop. | Note | %± |
|---|---|---|---|
| 2020 | 155 | | — |
U.S. Decennial Census

== Education ==
It is in the West Las Vegas Schools school district. West Las Vegas High School is the area high school.

== See also ==
- San Miguel del Vado Land Grant
