= Simon Romero =

American journalist

- Born: New Mexico
- Education: West Las Vegas High School; Harvard College; University of São Paulo
- Occupation: Journalist
- Notable credit: The New York Times
- Awards: Maria Moors Cabot Prize; Robert Spiers Benjamin Award

Simon Romero is an American journalist who is an International Correspondent for The New York Times. Based in Mexico City, he travels widely to write about Mexico, Central America and the Caribbean.

Previously, Romero worked in Latin America for The New York Times for more than a decade as the newspaper's Brazil Bureau Chief, based in Rio de Janeiro, and Andean Bureau Chief, based in Caracas. He covered major stories including the 2016 Olympics and 2014 World Cup in Brazil; drug wars in the Andes; deforestation in the Amazon River Basin; guerrilla insurgencies in Colombia, Peru and Paraguay; oil nationalism and political persecution in Venezuela; natural disasters in Haiti; Indigenous politics in Bolivia; and the emerging geopolitics of Antarctica. Romero has also covered the American Southwest, focusing on the U.S.-Mexico border. He joined the Times in March 1999.

== Career ==
Romero was born and raised in New Mexico and graduated from West Las Vegas High School in San Miguel County, N.M. He subsequently graduated with honors from Harvard College with a degree in History and Literature. He also studied for one year in the history department at the University of São Paulo in Brazil. Prior to his national career in journalism, Romero was the founding editor-in-chief of the Weekly Alibi, an alternative weekly in Albuquerque.

Romero joined the Times as a contract writer in March 1999, covering economic issues from São Paulo, Brazil. He subsequently covered telecommunications for the Times from New York from 2000 to 2003 and was a national financial correspondent based in Houston, Texas, from 2003 to 2006, focusing on the international energy industry. In August 2006, Romero was named the Times bureau chief in Caracas, moving the Andean bureau there from Bogota, Colombia. Prior to joining the Times, Romero worked in Brazil for Bloomberg News, having launched the company's news bureaus in Brasília and Rio de Janeiro. He is also a former senior correspondent based in Rio de Janeiro for the pan-regional business magazine America Economia.

In October 2007, intruders broke into Romero's home in Caracas, stealing his computer.

Romero is a founding member of the Amazon Rainforest Journalism Fund's advisory committee. The fund, which launched in 2018 with support from the Pulitzer Center, enables reporting projects focusing on tropical rainforests in Bolivia, Brazil, Colombia, Ecuador, Guyana, Peru, Suriname, and Venezuela.

== Awards ==
Simon Romero received the Maria Moors Cabot Prize for reporting on Latin America & the Caribbean in 2015. In 2014, he won the Robert Spiers Benjamin Award for best reporting in any medium on Latin America.
