= Santa Fe County/NM 599 station =

Santa Fe County/NM 599
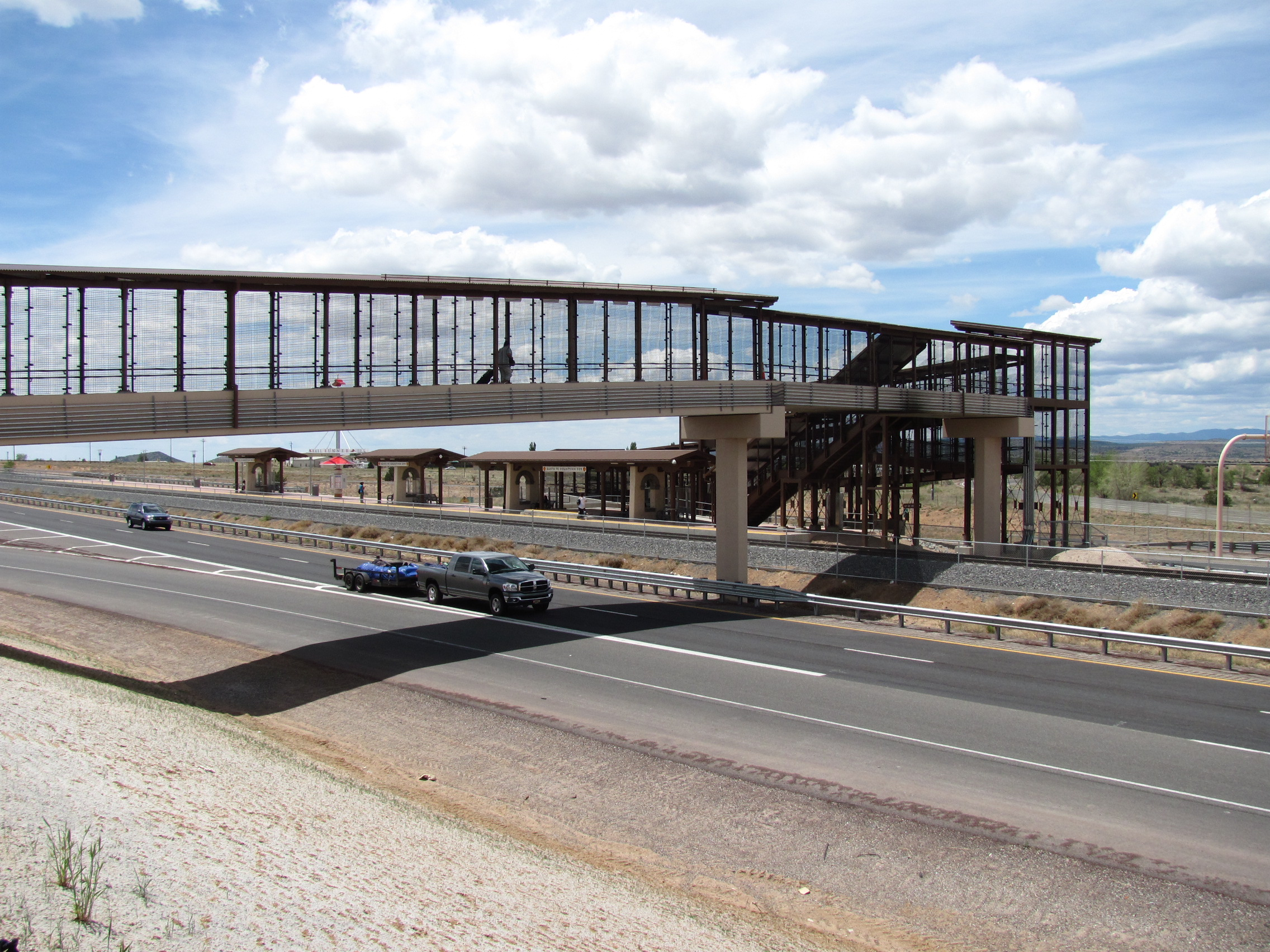
- The station in May 2010

General information
- Location: Interstate 25 and NM Highway 599
- Coordinates: 35°35′31″N 106°3′37″W
- Platforms: 1 side platform
- Tracks: 1

Construction
- Parking: 200+ spaces
- Accessible: yes

Other information
- Fare zone: Zone E

History
- Opened: August 1, 2009

Services
Preceding station	New Mexico Rail Runner Express	Following station
Kewa toward Belen	Rail Runner Express	Zia Road toward Santa Fe Depot
Location

Santa Fe County/NM 599 station is a station on the New Mexico Rail Runner Express commuter rail line, located southwest of Santa Fe, New Mexico, in Santa Fe County. The station platform is located in the median of Interstate 25 adjacent to its interchange with New Mexico State Highway 599. A walkway over the northbound lanes of I-25 connects the platform with the parking lot.

The station opened on August 1, 2009, as an infill station.
