= Las Vegas, New Mexico =

- City
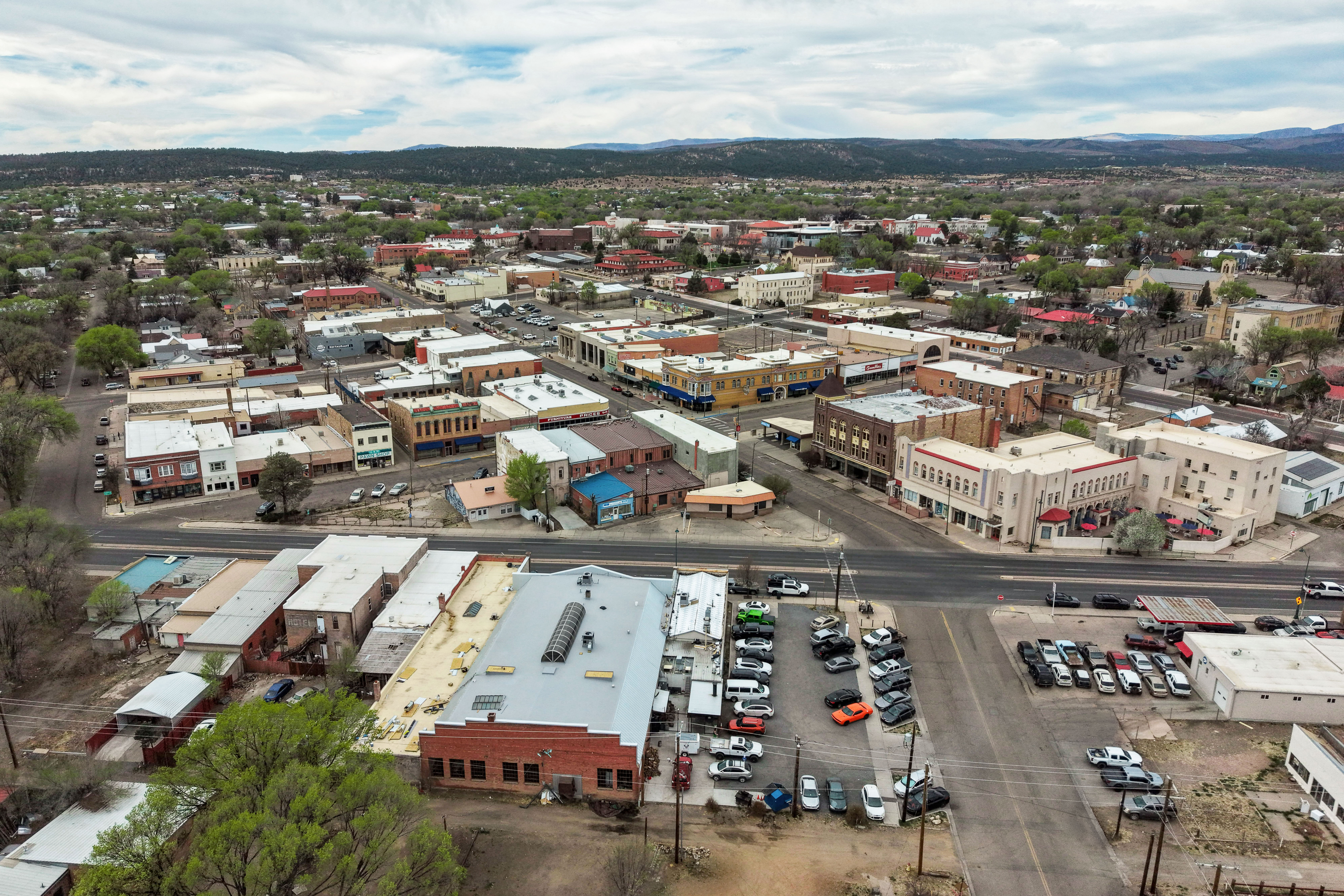
- Aerial view of downtown

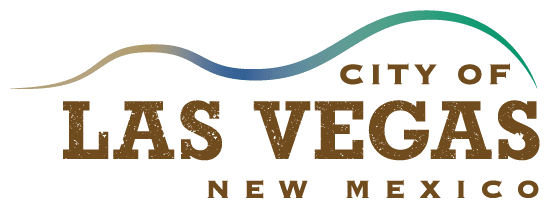
- Seal

- Location in San Miguel County and the state of New Mexico

- Location in the United States
- Coordinates: 35°36′15″N 105°13′21″W
- Country: United States
- State: New Mexico
- County: San Miguel

Government
  - Type: Mayor-council government
  - Mayor: David Romero
  - City Manager: Robert A Anaya

Area
  - Total: 8.63 sq mi (22.34 km^{2})
  - Land: 8.62 sq mi (22.33 km^{2})
  - Water: 0.0039 sq mi (0.01 km^{2})
- Elevation: 6,441 ft (1,963 m)

Population (2020)
  - Total: 13,166
  - Density: 1,527.0/sq mi (589.59/km^{2})
- Time zone: UTC−07:00 (MST)
  - Summer (DST): UTC−06:00 (MDT)
- ZIP Codes: 87701, 87745
- Area code: 505
- FIPS code: 35-39940
- GNIS feature ID: 2411631
- Website: lasvegasnm.gov

Las Vegas is a city in the state of New Mexico in the United States. It is the county seat of San Miguel County. Las Vegas was once two separate municipalities, one named West Las Vegas ("Old Town") and one named East Las Vegas ("New Town"). They were separated by the Gallinas River and still retain distinct characters and separate school districts. Las Vegas is a college town, home to New Mexico Highlands University and Luna Community College.

The city's population was 13,166 at the official 2020 census.

== History ==
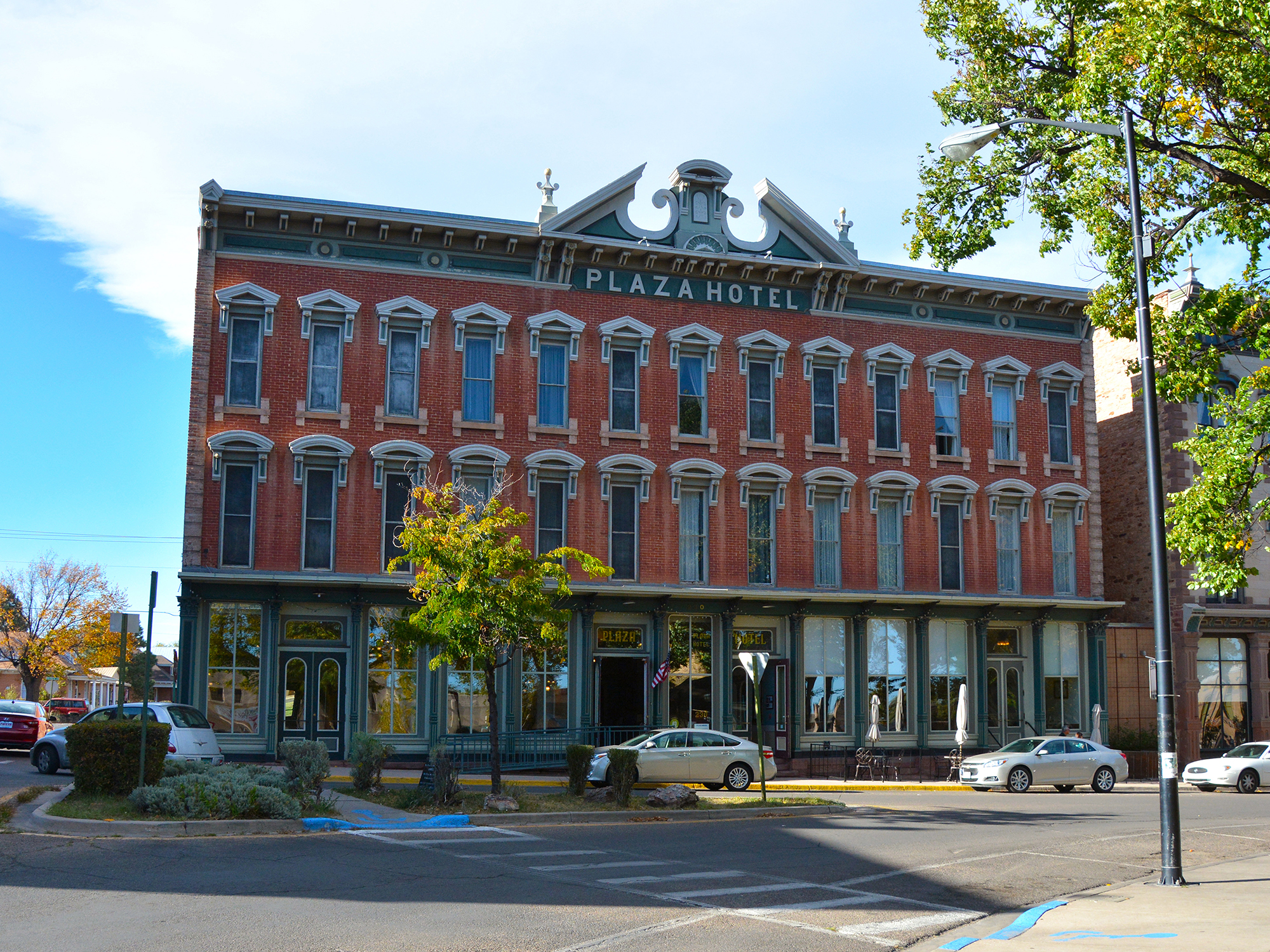
The Plaza Hotel, built in 1881, on the Plaza of West Las Vegas

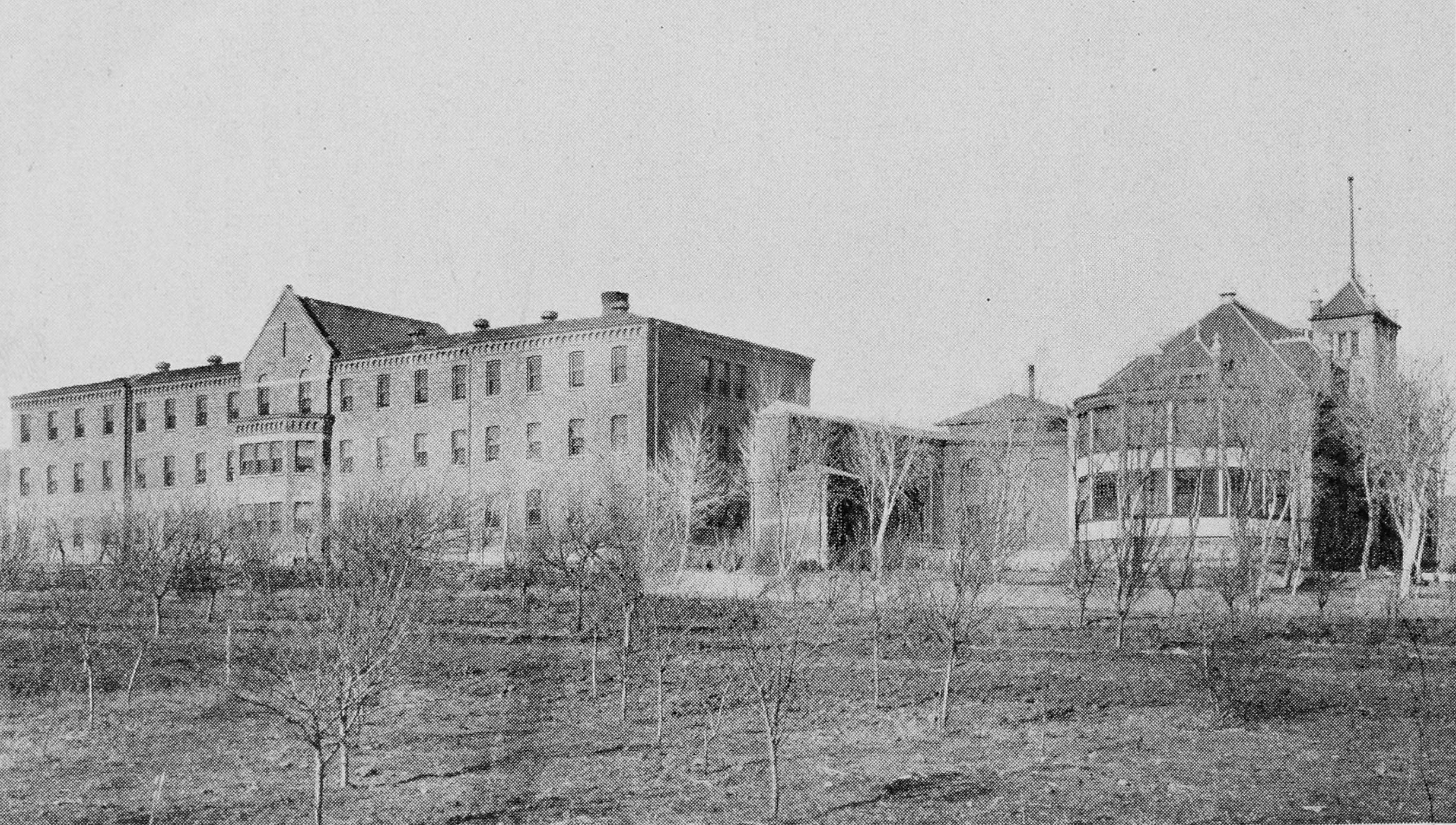
New Mexico Insane Asylum in Las Vegas, 1904

Las Vegas was established in 1835 after a group of settlers received a land grant from the Mexican government. (The land had previously been granted to Luis María Cabeza de Baca, whose family later received a settlement.) The town was laid out in the traditional Spanish Colonial style, with a central plaza surrounded by buildings that could serve as fortifications in case of attack. Las Vegas soon prospered as a stop on the Santa Fe Trail. During the Mexican–American War in 1846, Stephen W. Kearny delivered an address at the Plaza of Las Vegas claiming New Mexico for the United States. In 1847, the town was the site of the Battle of Las Vegas, which was a part of the broader Taos Revolt by local Hispanos and Pueblo peoples against United States occupation. In 1860, the United States Congress passed a law allowing the Cabeza de Baca heirs to choose other grants in lieu of their Las Vegas grant.

In 1877 Las Vegas College, the precursor to Regis University, was founded in Las Vegas by a group of exiled Italian Jesuits. In 1887, Las Vegas College moved to Denver whereupon the name was changed.

The Atchison, Topeka and Santa Fe Railroad arrived at Las Vegas from the north on July 4, 1879. To maintain control of development rights, it established a station and related development one mile (1.6 km) east of the Plaza, creating a separate, rival New Town, as occurred elsewhere in the Old West. The same competing development occurred in Albuquerque, for instance. Turn-of-the-century Las Vegas featured modern amenities, including an electric street railway, the "Duncan Opera House" at the northeast corner of 6th Street and Douglas Avenue, a Carnegie library, the Castañeda Hotel (a major Harvey House), and the New Mexico Normal School (now New Mexico Highlands University). The city's population has been declining since the 2000 census count. Although the two towns have been combined, separate school districts have been maintained (Las Vegas City Schools district and West Las Vegas Schools district).

The anti-colonist organization Las Gorras Blancas was active in the area in the 1890s.

=== Cowboy Reunions ===
Beginning in 1915, the Las Vegas Cowboys' Reunions were held annually until 1931; then, in 1939, the Cowboys' Reunions were re-established. Their slogan was, "Git Fer Vegas, Cowboy!" These reunions were organized by a group of ranching families and cowboys, which soon became the Las Vegas Cowboys' Reunion Association. The Reunions celebrated ranching life, which began in northern New Mexico in the early 1800s and continues into the 21st century. The annual affair included pie-eating contests, barbecues, parades, banquets, balls, and "ranch rodeos." In the early years, celebrities—cowhands as well as big-name bands, movie stars like Tom Mix, and artists such as Randall Davey—came to Las Vegas for this event. In later years, famous cowhands participated in the Cowboys' Reunion Rodeos. The Cowboys' Reunions reflected the occupations of the area and attracted huge crowds for their four days of events. In 1952, the Cowboys' Reunion Association invited the Rough Riders Association to join them at the annual rodeo.

=== Outlaws ===
The arrival of the railroad in 1879 also brought businesses, development and new residents, both respectable and dubious. Murderers, robbers, thieves, gamblers, gunmen, swindlers, vagrants, and tramps poured in, transforming the eastern side of the settlement into a virtually lawless brawl. Among the notorious characters were such legends of the Old West as dentist Doc Holliday and his girlfriend Big Nose Kate, Dave Rudabaugh, Jesse James, Billy the Kid, Wyatt Earp, Mysterious Dave Mather, Hoodoo Brown, and Handsome Harry the Dancehall Rustler.

Historian Ralph Emerson Twitchell once claimed, regarding the Old West, "Without exception there was no town which harbored a more disreputable gang of desperadoes and outlaws than did Las Vegas."

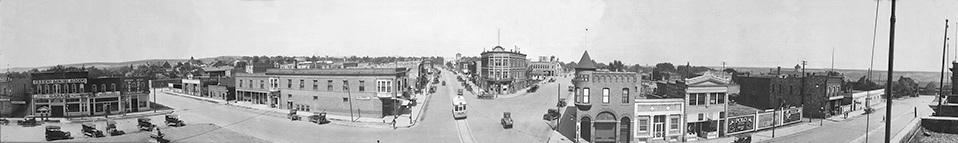
c. 1910–1920

== Geography ==
According to the United States Census Bureau, the city has a total area of 7.5 square miles (19 km^{2}), all land.

== Climate ==
Las Vegas has a cold semi-arid climate (Köppen climate classification: BSk).

Climate data for Las Vegas Municipal Airport, New Mexico, 1991–2020 normals, extremes 1940–present
Month	Jan	Feb	Mar	Apr	May	Jun	Jul	Aug	Sep	Oct	Nov	Dec	Year
Record high °F (°C)	72 (22)	75 (24)	86 (30)	85 (29)	95 (35)	99 (37)	100 (38)	99 (37)	95 (35)	87 (31)	80 (27)	75 (24)	100 (38)
Mean maximum °F (°C)	63.4 (17.4)	65.6 (18.7)	73.0 (22.8)	77.6 (25.3)	84.8 (29.3)	92.7 (33.7)	92.4 (33.6)	89.9 (32.2)	86.2 (30.1)	81.4 (27.4)	72.1 (22.3)	64.9 (18.3)	94.7 (34.8)
Mean daily maximum °F (°C)	46.7 (8.2)	49.4 (9.7)	56.3 (13.5)	63.1 (17.3)	72.0 (22.2)	82.0 (27.8)	83.5 (28.6)	81.3 (27.4)	76.0 (24.4)	65.9 (18.8)	55.1 (12.8)	46.4 (8.0)	64.8 (18.2)
Daily mean °F (°C)	33.1 (0.6)	35.4 (1.9)	41.4 (5.2)	47.8 (8.8)	56.5 (13.6)	65.8 (18.8)	68.8 (20.4)	67.1 (19.5)	61.2 (16.2)	51.0 (10.6)	40.6 (4.8)	33.0 (0.6)	50.1 (10.1)
Mean daily minimum °F (°C)	19.5 (−6.9)	21.5 (−5.8)	26.5 (−3.1)	32.4 (0.2)	41.1 (5.1)	49.7 (9.8)	54.1 (12.3)	52.8 (11.6)	46.4 (8.0)	36.0 (2.2)	26.0 (−3.3)	19.6 (−6.9)	35.5 (1.9)
Mean minimum °F (°C)	3.3 (−15.9)	4.5 (−15.3)	10.3 (−12.1)	19.0 (−7.2)	28.4 (−2.0)	40.6 (4.8)	48.3 (9.1)	46.7 (8.2)	35.1 (1.7)	20.6 (−6.3)	8.7 (−12.9)	1.3 (−17.1)	−3.7 (−19.8)
Record low °F (°C)	−26 (−32)	−23 (−31)	−16 (−27)	−2 (−19)	17 (−8)	31 (−1)	38 (3)	39 (4)	23 (−5)	3 (−16)	−12 (−24)	−14 (−26)	−26 (−32)
Average precipitation inches (mm)	0.35 (8.9)	0.32 (8.1)	0.60 (15)	0.68 (17)	1.32 (34)	1.62 (41)	3.24 (82)	3.13 (80)	2.16 (55)	1.36 (35)	0.51 (13)	0.44 (11)	15.73 (400)
Average precipitation days (≥ 0.01 in)	3.4	3.2	4.0	4.7	6.7	7.9	12.7	12.8	7.8	5.2	3.6	3.6	75.6
Source 1: NOAA
Source 2: National Weather Service

Climate data for Las Vegas, New Mexico, 1991–2020 normals, extremes 1983–present
Month	Jan	Feb	Mar	Apr	May	Jun	Jul	Aug	Sep	Oct	Nov	Dec	Year
Record high °F (°C)	72 (22)	74 (23)	80 (27)	85 (29)	92 (33)	98 (37)	99 (37)	95 (35)	94 (34)	88 (31)	81 (27)	75 (24)	99 (37)
Mean maximum °F (°C)	64.0 (17.8)	65.7 (18.7)	72.8 (22.7)	77.2 (25.1)	86.2 (30.1)	92.4 (33.6)	93.0 (33.9)	91.0 (32.8)	86.7 (30.4)	81.4 (27.4)	71.8 (22.1)	66.3 (19.1)	94.5 (34.7)
Mean daily maximum °F (°C)	50.1 (10.1)	52.8 (11.6)	60.4 (15.8)	67.2 (19.6)	75.0 (23.9)	84.7 (29.3)	85.2 (29.6)	84.2 (29.0)	78.6 (25.9)	69.2 (20.7)	58.7 (14.8)	50.2 (10.1)	68.0 (20.0)
Daily mean °F (°C)	30.7 (−0.7)	33.6 (0.9)	40.4 (4.7)	47.7 (8.7)	55.3 (12.9)	64.9 (18.3)	68.2 (20.1)	67.2 (19.6)	60.3 (15.7)	49.3 (9.6)	38.9 (3.8)	30.8 (−0.7)	48.9 (9.4)
Mean daily minimum °F (°C)	11.3 (−11.5)	14.4 (−9.8)	20.3 (−6.5)	28.2 (−2.1)	35.7 (2.1)	45.2 (7.3)	51.2 (10.7)	50.2 (10.1)	42.1 (5.6)	29.4 (−1.4)	19.0 (−7.2)	11.5 (−11.4)	29.9 (−1.2)
Mean minimum °F (°C)	−3.2 (−19.6)	−0.6 (−18.1)	6.7 (−14.1)	17.1 (−8.3)	24.2 (−4.3)	34.9 (1.6)	43.2 (6.2)	41.9 (5.5)	30.0 (−1.1)	15.0 (−9.4)	3.0 (−16.1)	−5.1 (−20.6)	−11.3 (−24.1)
Record low °F (°C)	−22 (−30)	−32 (−36)	−9 (−23)	10 (−12)	11 (−12)	28 (−2)	33 (1)	30 (−1)	20 (−7)	−3 (−19)	−16 (−27)	−32 (−36)	−32 (−36)
Average precipitation inches (mm)	0.42 (11)	0.45 (11)	0.56 (14)	0.70 (18)	1.49 (38)	1.36 (35)	3.19 (81)	3.12 (79)	2.43 (62)	1.69 (43)	0.57 (14)	0.74 (19)	16.72 (425)
Average snowfall inches (cm)	3.0 (7.6)	3.8 (9.7)	2.8 (7.1)	1.3 (3.3)	0.0 (0.0)	0.0 (0.0)	0.0 (0.0)	0.0 (0.0)	0.0 (0.0)	1.4 (3.6)	4.0 (10)	5.7 (14)	22.0 (56)
Average precipitation days (≥ 0.01 in)	2.0	2.3	2.2	2.8	4.3	4.9	9.1	9.5	5.6	3.4	2.8	2.1	51.0
Average snowy days (≥ 0.1 in)	1.7	1.5	1.1	0.4	0.0	0.0	0.0	0.0	0.0	0.3	1.3	1.6	7.9
Source 1: NOAA
Source 2: National Weather Service

== Natural disasters ==
In April 2022, Las Vegas and the surrounding areas of San Miguel and Mora counties experienced the Calf Canyon/Hermits Peak Fire. The wildfire burned 341,471 acres (1,382 km^{2}), making it the largest wildfire in New Mexico's recorded history.

== Demographics ==
Historical population
Census	Pop.	Note	%±
1890	2,312		—
1900	3,552		53.6%
1910	3,755		5.7%
1920	4,304		14.6%
1930	4,719		9.6%
1940	5,941		25.9%
1950	7,494		26.1%
1960	7,790		3.9%
1970	7,528		−3.4%
1980	14,322		90.2%
1990	14,753		3.0%
2000	14,565		−1.3%
2010	13,753		−5.6%
2020	13,166		−4.3%
2021 (est.)	13,157		−0.1%
U.S. Decennial Census

The population of Las Vegas peaked at 14,753 in 1990, and the city's population decreased in each decennial census from 2000 to 2020.

=== 2020 census ===
As of the 2020 census, Las Vegas had a population of 13,166. The median age was 40.3 years. 19.7% of residents were under the age of 18 and 19.8% of residents were 65 years of age or older. For every 100 females there were 93.8 males, and for every 100 females age 18 and over there were 92.3 males age 18 and over.

96.7% of residents lived in urban areas, while 3.3% lived in rural areas.

There were 5,590 households in Las Vegas, of which 26.7% had children under the age of 18 living in them. Of all households, 25.8% were married-couple households, 25.8% were households with a male householder and no spouse or partner present, and 38.4% were households with a female householder and no spouse or partner present. About 38.9% of all households were made up of individuals and 15.5% had someone living alone who was 65 years of age or older.

There were 6,570 housing units, of which 14.9% were vacant. The homeowner vacancy rate was 2.8% and the rental vacancy rate was 10.7%.

Racial composition as of the 2020 census
Race	Number	Percent
White	5,888	44.7%
Black or African American	238	1.8%
American Indian and Alaska Native	295	2.2%
Asian	102	0.8%
Native Hawaiian and Other Pacific Islander	2	0.0%
Some other race	2,928	22.2%
Two or more races	3,713	28.2%
Hispanic or Latino (of any race)	10,498	79.7%

=== 2000 census ===
As of the census of 2000, there were 14,565 people, 5,588 households, and 3,559 families residing in the city. The population density was 1,938.2 inhabitants per square mile (748.3/km^{2}). There were 6,366 housing units at an average density of 847.1 per square mile (327.1/km^{2}). The racial makeup of the city was 54.21% White, 0.99% African American, 1.96% Native American, 0.61% Asian, 0.10% Pacific Islander, 37.19% from other races, and 4.95% from two or more races. Hispanic people of any race were 82.94% of the population.

In the city, the population was spread out, with 26.4% under the age of 18, 13.3% from 18 to 24, 26.2% from 25 to 44, 21.2% from 45 to 64, and 12.8% who were 65 years of age or older. The median age was 34 years. For every 100 females, there were 90.4 males. For every 100 females age 18 and over, there were 86.2 males.

=== Demographic estimates ===
In 2019, the average household size was 2.48 and the average family size was 3.08.

=== Income and poverty ===
The median income in 2019 for a household in the city was $26,561, as compared to the New Mexico median income of $49,754 and the national median of $62,843. The median income for a family in Las Vegas was $29,797. Males had a median income of $26,319 versus $21,731 for females. The per capita income for the city was $20,080 as compared to $34,103 nationally, as noted in the 2019 Census estimate. In the past, 24.3% of families and 27.8% of the population were below the poverty line, including 35.7% of those under age 18 and 20.1% of those age 65 or over. The most recent figures (2019) as provided by the U. S. Census Bureau estimate the total number of persons (all ages) at or below the poverty line has increased to 35.6%. This is significantly higher than the national average of 10.5% and the State average of 18.2%.

== Libraries and museums ==
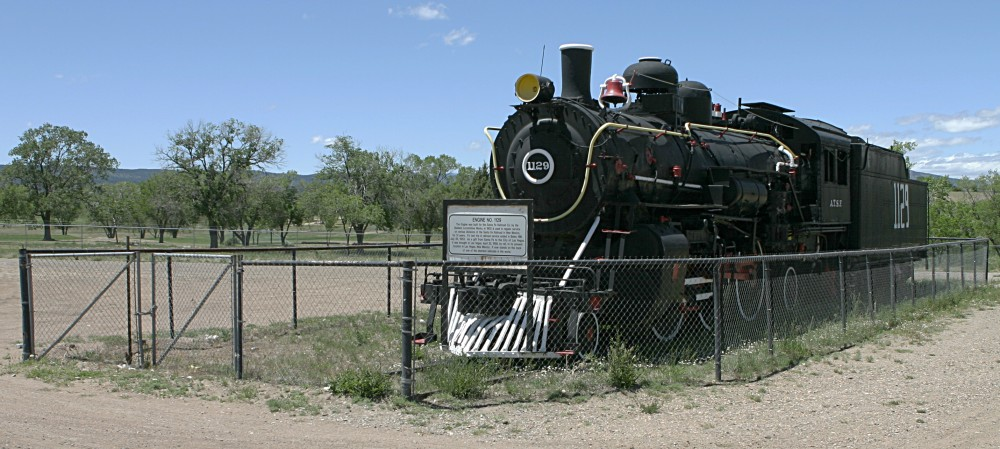
AT&SF engine #1129 on the corner of Grand & Mills

New Mexico Highlands University, founded 1893, is home to the Thomas C. Donnelly Library. It supports the teaching, research and community activities of New Mexico Highlands University. It acquires, organizes, preserves and provides access to pertinent information and scholarly materials for curricular needs, intellectual pursuits and personal enrichment of its clientele. It promotes programs and services that emphasize the diversity of the university's multicultural community and heritage. An addition increased the square footage from 23,700 to 53,500 and now holds a book collection of almost 200,000 volumes.

Las Vegas' Carnegie Library, established in 1904, is the only surviving Carnegie Library in New Mexico. Built from a $10,000 donation from philanthropist Andrew Carnegie, its Neo-Classical Revival architecture resembles Thomas Jefferson's Monticello. The library sits in the middle of a park that occupies an entire city block, bordered by Victorian-style homes and buildings.

The City of Las Vegas Museum & Rough Rider Memorial on Grand Avenue, dedicated in 1940, was first established by the decision of Theodore Roosevelt's Rough Riders regiment (the first Volunteer Cavalry Regiment of the Spanish–American War), who named Las Vegas its official reunion home. Their first reunion was held in Las Vegas, June 1899.

The museum, free and open to the public, houses a memorial collection of artifacts, archives and photographs from the Rough Riders and mementos in relation to the 1898 Cuban Campaign of the Spanish–American War, with information on over 200 members of the original regiment, RRR Association documents, etc. The museum illuminates the history of Las Vegas, its connection to the Rough Riders, the Santa Fe Trail and the development of New Mexico. It features collections of local Native American pottery, household items, costumes, ranching and farming equipment, agricultural and mercantile operations, and home life.

Housed in a 1940 Works Progress Administration-funded building, the museum is built of stone, with Pueblo Revival nuances.

=== Architecture ===
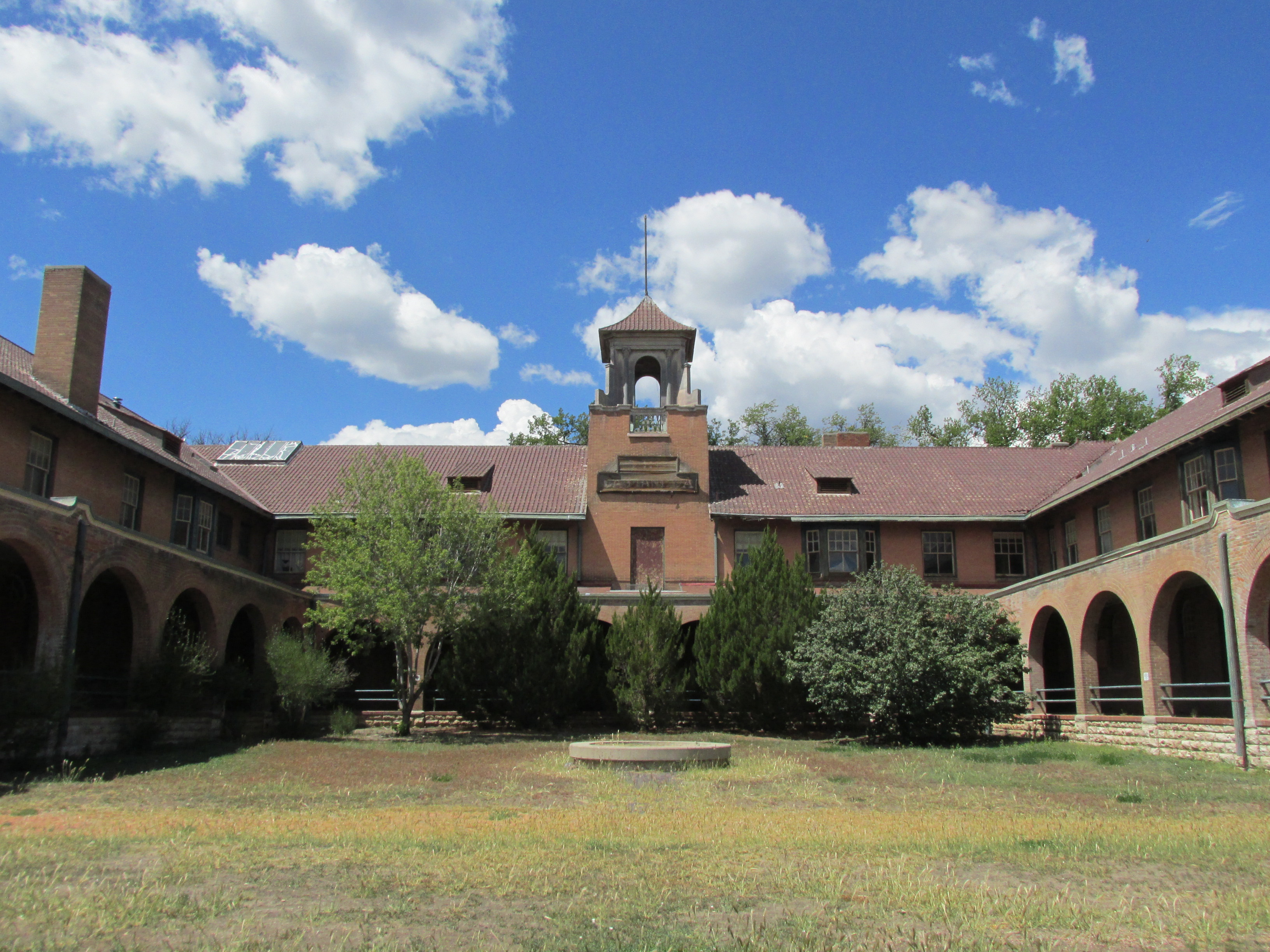
Historic Castañeda railway hotel

Las Vegas has numerous historic structures (mostly railroad-era houses and commercial buildings), with over 900 listed on the National Register of Historic Places. Although many buildings are in varying states of deterioration, others have been restored or are awaiting restoration. Some of the city's notable buildings include:

- Dr. H.J. Mueller House, now a Bed and Breakfast called Crow's Nest Bed and Breakfast. An 1881 example of Victorian eclecticism with unusual octagonal tower
- Plaza Hotel, 1881, site of the first reunion of Teddy Roosevelt's Rough Riders in 1899
- Old City Hall, New Mexico's first municipal building, completed in 1892
- Louis Fort House, Queen Anne house on Carnegie Park, built in 1895
- Masonic Temple, Richardsonian Romanesque building erected in 1895
- Castañeda Hotel, mission-style Harvey House built in 1898
- Carnegie Library, built in 1903 at the center of Carnegie Park and modeled after Monticello

== Education ==
=== Public schools ===
Las Vegas is served by two public school districts: Las Vegas City Schools on the east side, and West Las Vegas School District on the west side.

There are two major high schools: Robertson High School and West Las Vegas High School.

=== Colleges ===
Las Vegas is the home of New Mexico Highlands University which is knwon for teacher training. It has curricula for science, drama, art, and foreign language faculty. The art department was nationally renowned in the 1950s to 1970s and beyond. The university sponsors intercollegiate athletics and is a member of NCAA II and the Rocky Mountain Athletic Conference.

Nearby, north of Las Vegas, is Luna Community College. The United World College in nearby Montezuma, New Mexico is a two-year international high school and one of the venues used by the International Baccalaureate Program for teacher training in the United States.

== Transportation ==
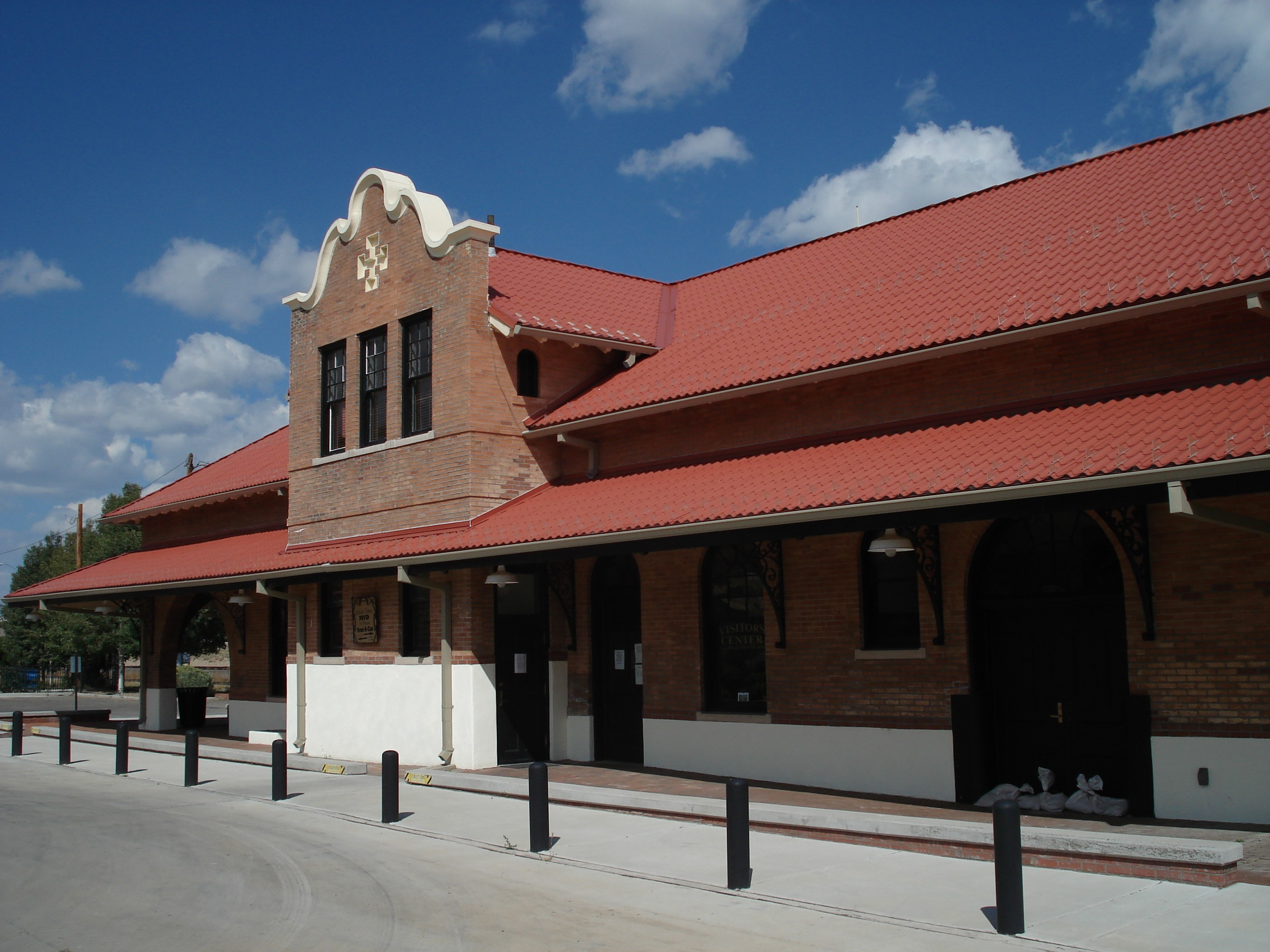
Las Vegas Intermodal Facility

Railway

The Las Vegas Intermodal Facility is a stop on the Amtrak Southwest Chief route.

Airport

Las Vegas Municipal Airport serves single engine planes, small commercial jets, and helicopters.

Major highways

- Interstate 25
- Interstate 40 (55 miles to the south via U.S. Route 84)

Bus service

- The city of Las Vegas operates Meadow City Express, a demand-responsive transport system.
- NMDOT Park and Ride operates intercity bus service from Las Vegas to Santa Fe.

== Media ==
Las Vegas has a semi-weekly newspaper, the Las Vegas Optic. It is published on Wednesday and Friday.

The Fort Union Drive-in Theater is located on 7th Street in Las Vegas.

== Films and television ==
Movies and television shows filmed in and around Las Vegas include:

- The 1984 movie Red Dawn
- The 2003 film Blind Horizon
- Most of the 2007 Coen brothers' feature film No Country for Old Men was filmed here.
- The 2012 A&E TV series Longmire starring Robert Taylor and Katee Sackhoff and set in Wyoming was filmed in Las Vegas.
- Scenes for the TV series House of Cards filmed in Las Vegas in November 2014 for two weeks. The footage was used in the third-season finale.
- The 2022 and 2024 Amazon Prime Video TV series Outer Range

== Notable people ==
- Antonia Apodaca (1923–2020), musician
- Paula Angel (1842–1861), murderer, only woman to be executed in post-colonial New Mexico
- Jesusita Aragón (1908–2005), midwife
- S. Omar Barker (1894–1985), oft-recited cowboy poet; born in a log cabin in New Mexico, where he lived his entire life as a rancher, legislator, WW1 veteran, teacher and writer
- Margaret Herrera Chávez (1912–1992), painter
- Ann Nolan Clark (1896–1995), teacher in public schools and reservations, writer of children's multicultural books
- Teresa Leger Fernandez (born 1959), attorney, member of the U.S. House of Representatives (current)
- Wally Funk (1939–2026), aviator, astronaut, and Goodwill Ambassador
- Fabiola Cabeza de Baca Gilbert (1894–1991), educator, nutritionist, activist, writer, inventor of the u-shaped fried taco shell
- Pelham D. Glassford (1883–1959), U.S. Army brigadier general
- Eddie Guerrero (1967–2005), professional wrestler for WWE, wrestled for New Mexico Highlands University
- Edgar Lee Hewett (1865–1946), archaeologist and anthropologist, founder of the Museum of New Mexico and first president of the New Mexico Normal School (now New Mexico Highlands University)
- Mari-Luci Jaramillo (1928–2019), educator and U.S. Ambassador to Honduras under Jimmy Carter
- Andrieus A. Jones (1862–1927), school principal and attorney, mayor of Las Vegas (1893–1894), United States Senator (1917–1927)
- Yetta Kohn (1843–1917), an early settler and businesswoman of Las Vegas, who became a successful New Mexican cattle rancher
- Margaret Larkin (1899–1967), writer and musician; born in Las Vegas
- Ray Leger (1925–2009), educator and member of the New Mexico Senate
- Pola Lopez (born 1954), artist
- George J. Maloof Sr. (1923–1980), heir and businessman; born in Las Vegas
- Frank Olmstead (1923–2004), mayor of Las Vegas and 18th Auditor of New Mexico
- Jacob S. Raisin (1878–1946), rabbi
- Patrick Swayze (1952–2009), actor, dancer and singer-songwriter; owned a ranch on the Gallinas River near Las Vegas
