= Santa Fe Preparatory School =

Private school in Santa Fe, New Mexico, US

Coordinates: 35.669085°N 105.913472°W

Location
- 1101 Camino de la Cruz; Santa Fe, New Mexico, 87505; United States

Information
- Type: Private
- Established: 1961
- Head teacher: Aaron Schubach
- Grades: 7-12
- Enrollment: 340
- Website: http://www.sfprep.org

Santa Fe Preparatory School is a private school located in Santa Fe, New Mexico The school provides grades 7–12 with an enrollment of 340 students. It was founded in February 1961.

== History ==
The school was founded in February 1961. The school opened its doors 1963 at a campus on Canyon Road, with sixty-three students in seventh through ninth grades.

== Campus ==
In the early 1970s, Santa Fe Prep moved to its current site, a 13-acre (53,000 m^{2}) campus near the Sangre de Cristo Mountains, adjacent to the Santa Fe campus of St. John's College. In 2001, Prep built a new School Commons and in 2006, the school completed a LEED Gold-certified library building that houses approximately 11,000 volumes.

The campus is also the location of the Meem Art Building, which was originally the home of architect John Gaw Meem.

== Notable alumni ==
- Ari Aster (did not graduate; director)
- Anna Gunn (class of 1986; actress)
- Tom Ford (class of 1979; fashion designer)
- Brad Sherwood (class of 1982; comedian)
- Miguel Sandoval (class of 1969; actor)
- Raul Midón (class of 1984; singer-songwriter)
- Peter Sarkisian (class of 1984; video and multimedia artist)
