= Alkemē =

Restaurant in Santa Fe, New Mexico, U.S.

- Interactive map of Alkemē

Restaurant information
- Location: 227 Don Gaspar Avenue, Santa Fe, New Mexico, 87501, United States
- Coordinates: 35°41′07″N 105°56′24″W
- Website: alkeme-santafe.com

Alkemē (pronounced like alchemy) is a restaurant in Santa Fe, New Mexico. In 2024, Alkemē was a semifinalist in the Best New Restaurant category of the James Beard Foundation Awards.
