= Arequipa =

City in Peru

- City
- City of Arequipa
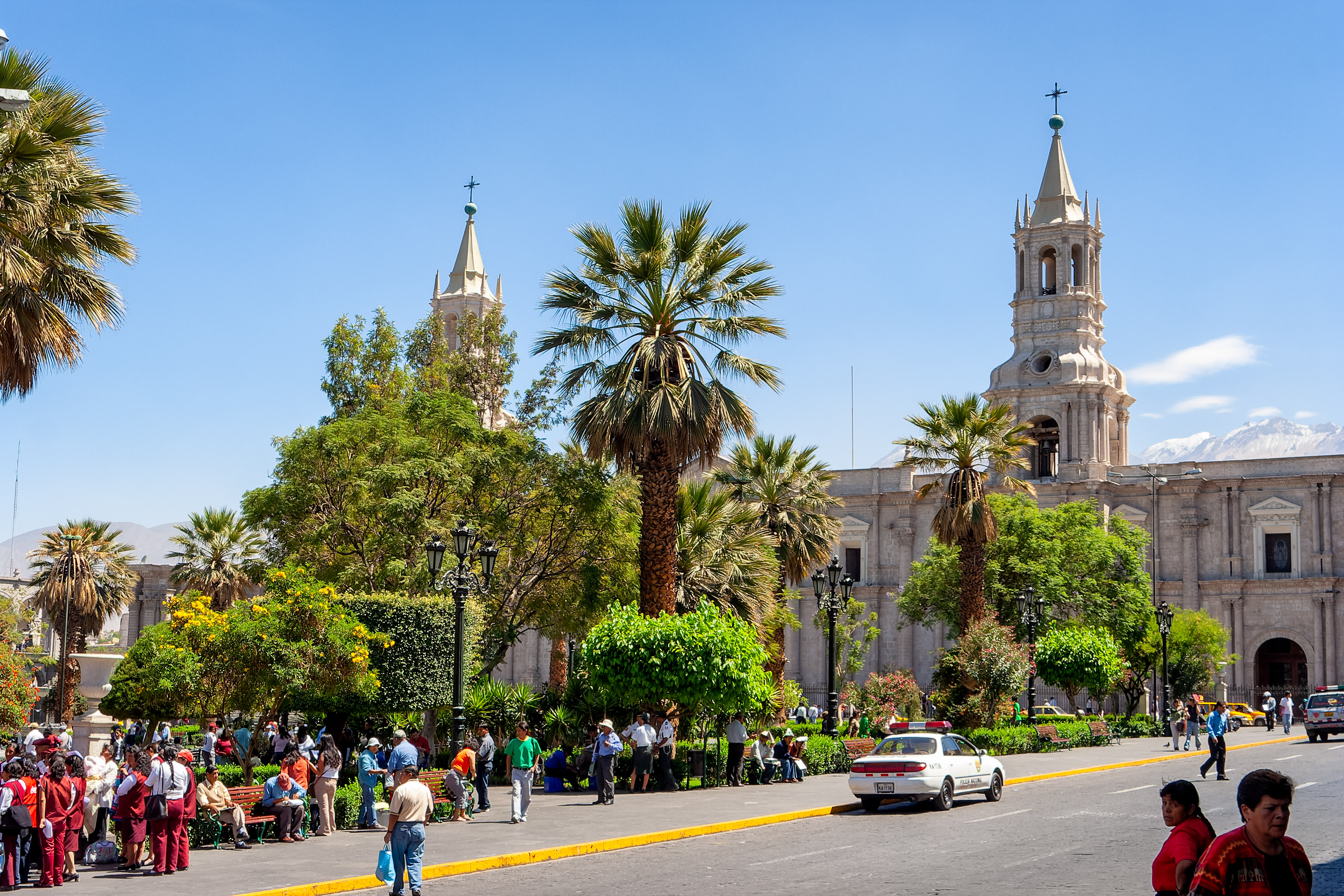
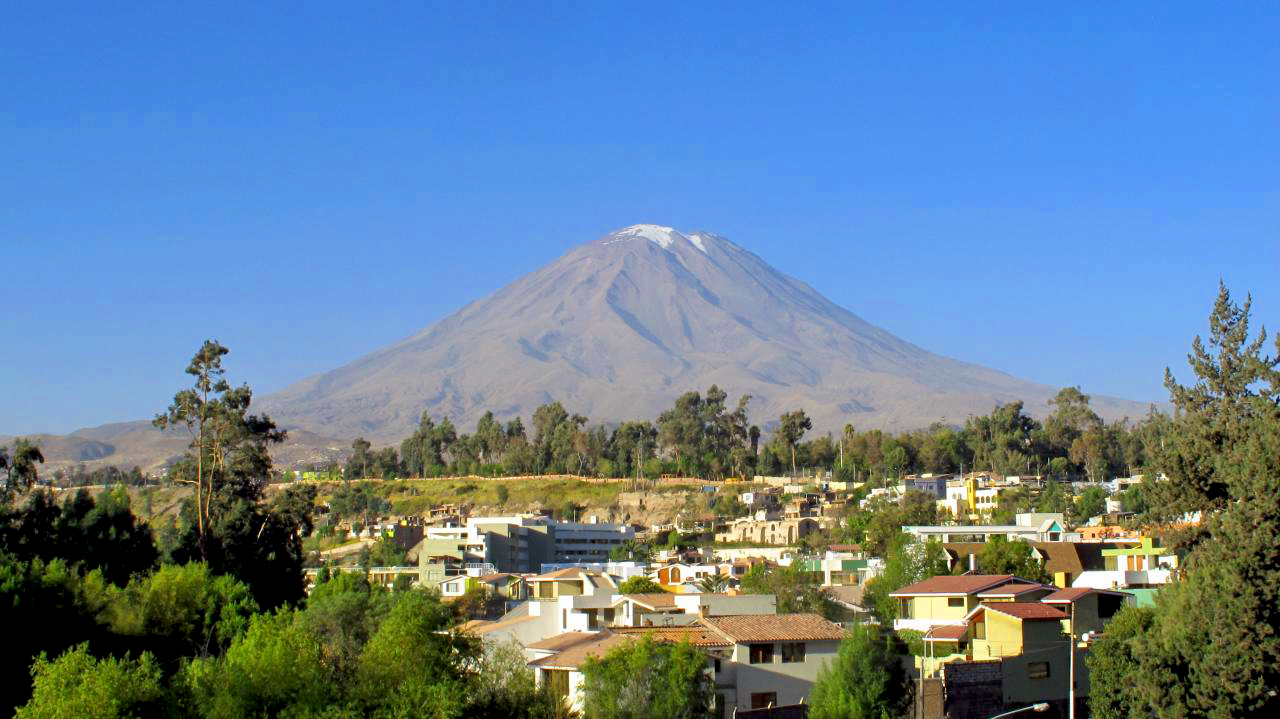
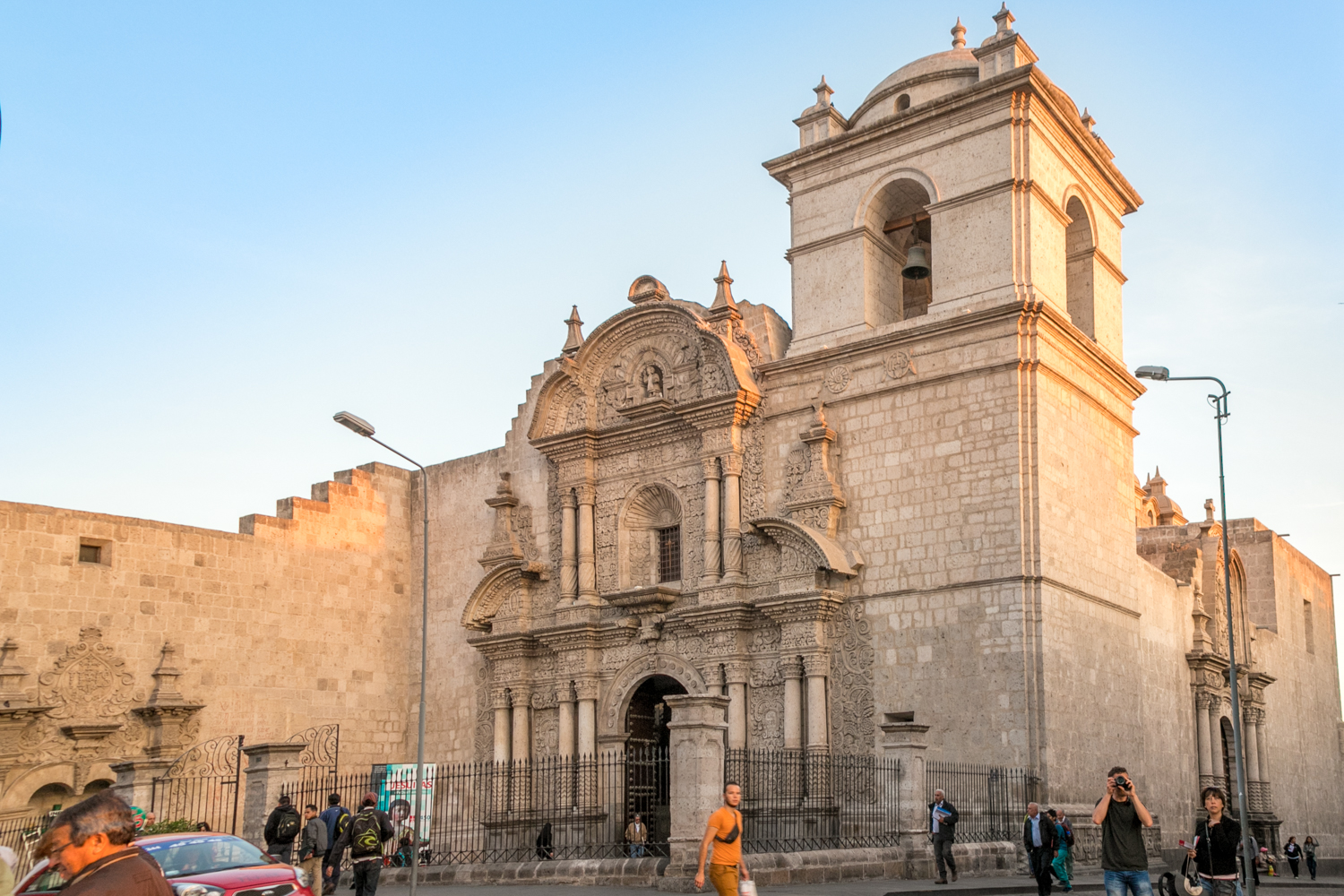
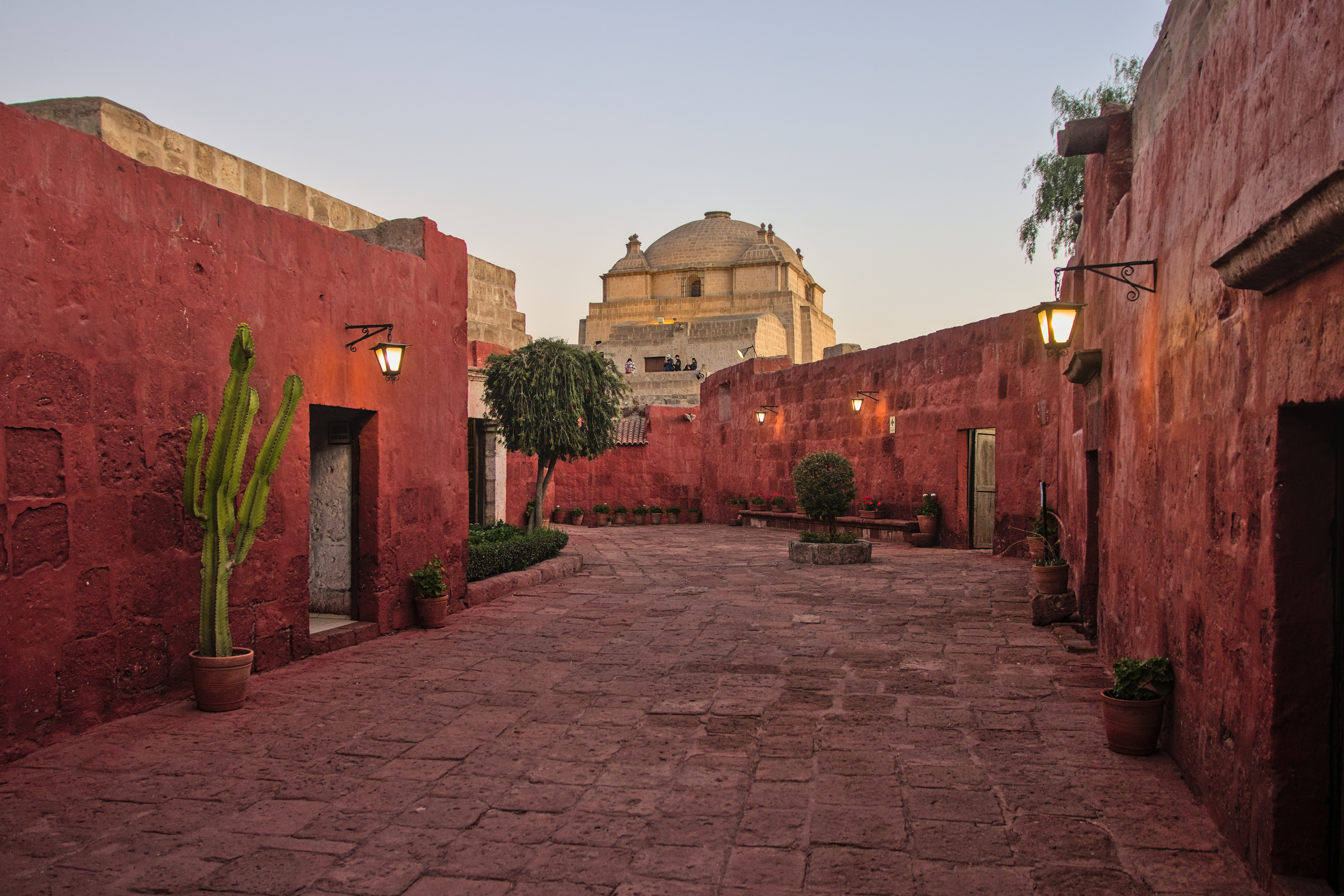
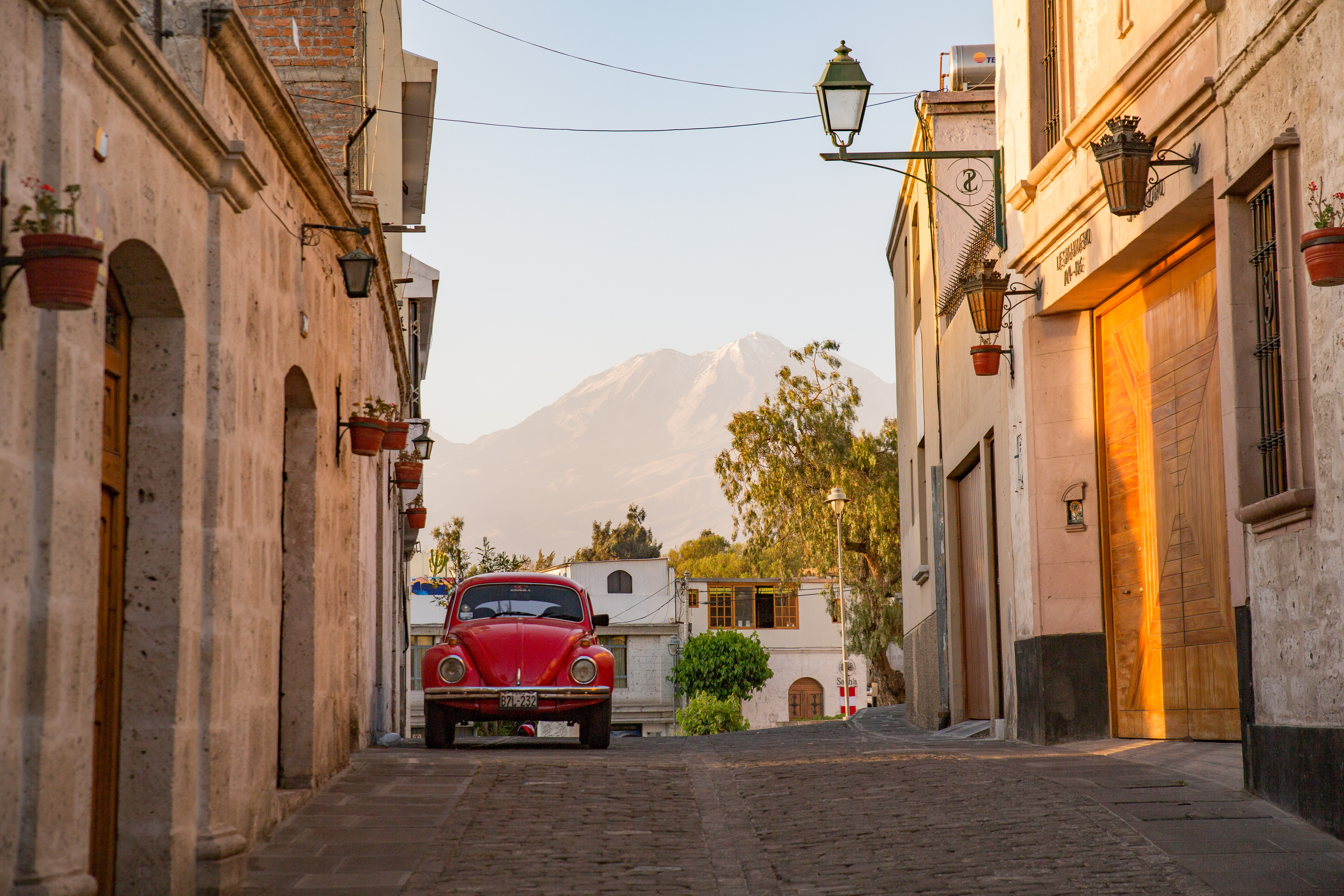
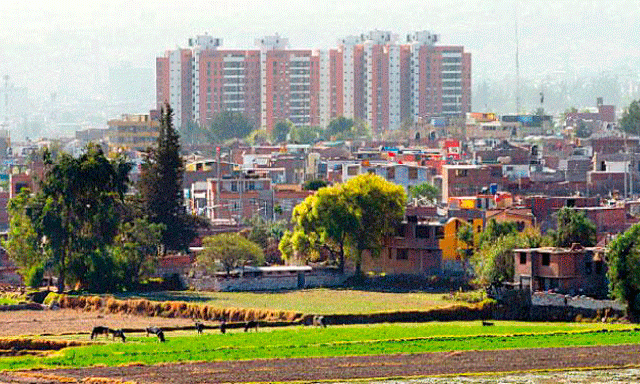
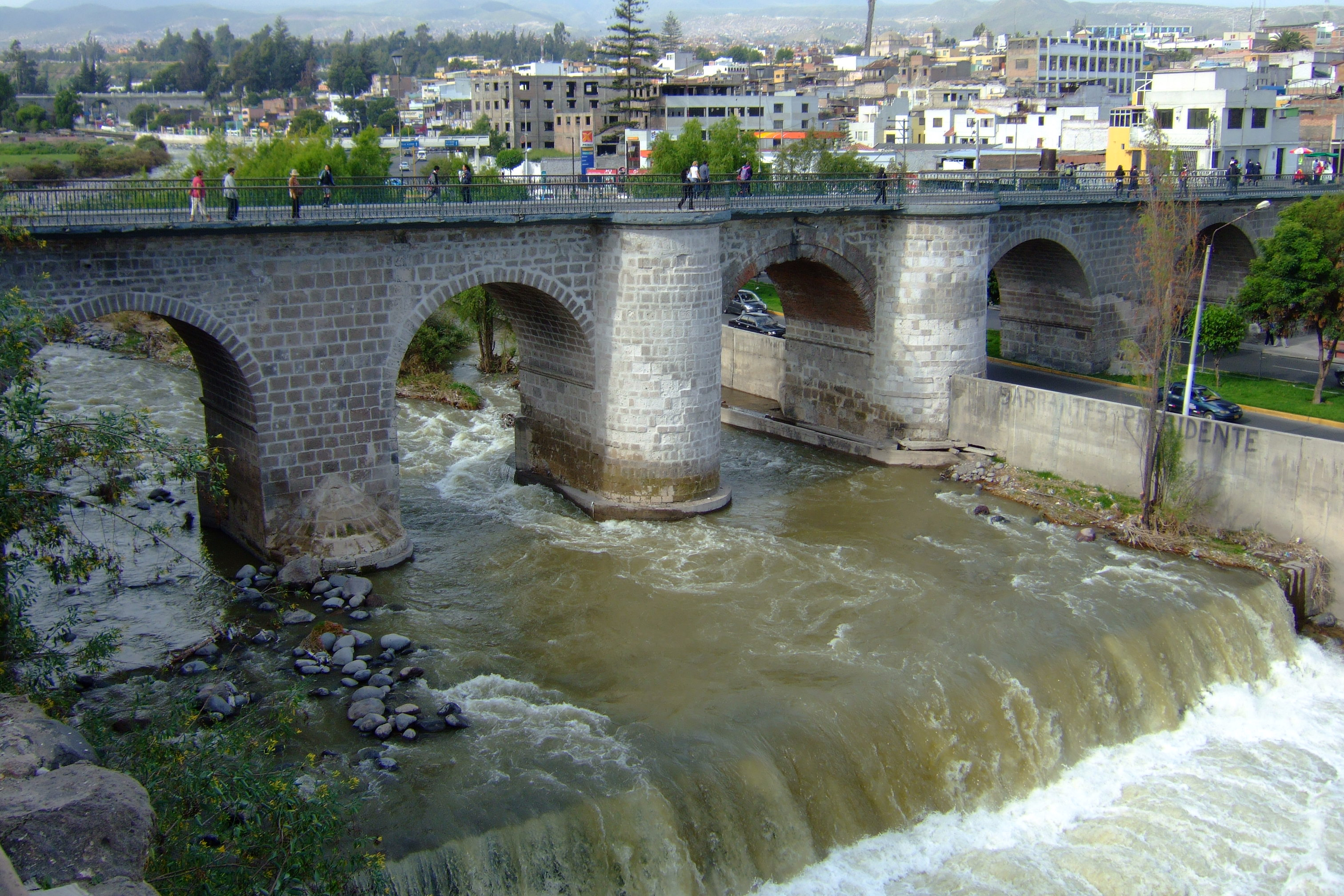
- Plaza de Armas with the Cathedral of Arequipa Misti Church of La Compañía Monastery of Santa Catalina San Lázaro quarter City view Puente Grau

- Flag Coat of arms
- Nicknames: White City, City of Eternal Blue Sky, Very Noble and Very Loyal, Lion of the South, Jewel of Viceregal Architecture, Legal Capital of Peru, Rome of America, Rome of Peru, Cradle of jurists, City-Caudillo
- Anthem: Himno Arequipeño
- Interactive map of Arequipa
- Location in Peru
- Coordinates: 16°23′56″S 71°32′13″W
- Country: Peru
- Department: Arequipa
- Province: Arequipa
- Districts: 14 city districts
- Founded: 15 August 1540
- Founder: Garcí Manuel de Carbajal

Government
  - Type: Provincial municipality
  - Mayor: Víctor Hugo Rivera
  - Term: 2023-2026

Area
  - Total: 230.46 km^{2} (88.98 sq mi)

Population
  - Estimate (2025): 1,195,700
  - Rank: 2nd in Peru
  - Density: 5,188/km^{2} (13,440/sq mi)
- Demonym(s): Arequipan; Arequipeño, -a; Mistiano, -a

GDP
  - City GDP: US$9.445 billion (2015)
  - Per capita: US$18,610 (2015)
- Time zone: UTC-5 (PET)
- Postal code: 040
- Area code: +51 54
- ISO 3166 code: PE-ARE
- Climate: Temperate arid, BWk
- Language: Spanish
- Patroness: Virgin of the Assumption
- Website: www.muniarequipa.gob.pe

UNESCO World Heritage Site
- Official name: Historical Centre of the City of Arequipa
- Type: Cultural
- Criteria: i, iv
- Designated: 2000
- Reference no.: 1016
- Region: Latin America and the Caribbean

Arequipa is a city in southern Peru and the capital of Arequipa Province and the Department of Arequipa. With a projected population of 1,195,700 in 2025, it is the country's second most populous city after Lima. It is the official seat of the Constitutional Court of Peru and is known as the "Legal Capital of Peru". Arequipa joined the UNESCO Global Network of Learning Cities in 2020.

Arequipa extends along both banks of the Chili River, in the Arequipa or Chili valley. The valley is bordered by the Andes to the north and east and by low coastal hills to the south and west. The city proper extends mainly over 14 districts, while the Arequipa metropolitan area includes 21 conurbated districts.

The site of the city was founded on 15 August 1540, when it was named "Villa Hermosa de Nuestra Señora de la Asunta de Arequipa". On 25 September 1541, by a real cédula issued by Charles V, it became the "City of Arequipa". During the viceregal period, Arequipa gained importance through its economic role and its loyalty to the Spanish monarchy.

Arequipa is Peru's second most industrialized city and one of its most economically active urban centers. In 2024 the Department of Arequipa recorded a nominal GDP of S/31.458 billion and GDP per capita of S/19,593, making it the country's second-largest regional economy. Because the capital city concentrates much of the department's economic activity, the departmental figure provides broad macroeconomic context for the city. A 2015 study estimated the city's own GDP at US$9.445 billion. Its industrial activity includes manufactured goods, textiles made from wool of camelids, and the production and sale of copper and molybdenum concentrates. The city maintains commercial links with Chile, Bolivia and Brazil, and is connected by the Southern Railway with the port of Matarani and the cities of Cusco and Puno.

After independence, the city gained political and economic importance. During the 19th and 20th centuries it acted as a counterweight to centralized power in Lima, functioning as a "second capital". It was a focus of popular, civic and democratic rebellions and produced prominent figures in politics and religion. Arequipa was the scene of more than seven uprisings or revolutions between independence and 1850 and twice served as the seat of the national government. During Salaverry's coup, President Luis José de Orbegoso installed his government in the city from 13 January 1835. On 31 August 1882, during the war with Chile, President Lizardo Montero declared Arequipa the capital of Peru and convened a National Congress on 28 April 1883.

In 2000, UNESCO inscribed 332 hectares of Arequipa's historic center as a World Heritage Site. Its historical and monumental heritage, together with its scenic and cultural spaces, has made it a destination for national and international tourism. In the historic area, viceregal and republican religious architecture combines Spanish and Indigenous features, forming a local architectural style known as the "Arequipan School", whose influence reached Potosí.

== Etymology ==
Several hypotheses have been proposed for the origin of the name "Arequipa". Some derive from local tradition, while others rest on geographical, archaeological and linguistic arguments.

One proposed derivation links the name to the Puquina language, spoken by the region's first inhabitants before the arrival of Aymara-speaking groups. According to this hypothesis, the original form was Are-quiapi. The main Puquina urban nucleus, Kasa-Patak, was discovered in 1942, and much local toponymy is said to derive from that language. The researcher Bernardo Málaga, who supported this interpretation, argued that the Aymara and Quechua versions were later and less likely:

The adaptive names Ari-quepa, which in Aymara means "behind the summit", and Are-quepay, Quechua, translated as "yes, stay here", cannot correspond to the factual reality established by archaeology, since there was no important settlement in the Arequipa countryside and it did not then offer the splendid panorama that now characterizes it.

— Leonidas Bernedo Málaga, La cultura Puquina

The best-known legend attributes the origin of the name to the Inca Mayta Cápac. According to the story, when he allowed his subjects to settle in the Chili valley, he said to them Ari qipay or Are quepay (Quechua: "Yes, stay"). This version was recorded by Father Calancha and translated by J. Ignacio Gamio.

Other versions propose an Aymara origin. Father Blas Valera, cited by the Inca Garcilaso de la Vega, suggested that the name came from ari qquepan or are quepa, referring to a sea shell used as a war trumpet. Similarly, historian Ernst Middendorf argued that the name derived from the Aymara ari qhipaya or ariq qipa, meaning "behind the peak", in reference to the Misti volcano.

== City symbols ==
=== Flag ===
The city flag displays the city's coat of arms on a crimson field. The color of the standard, however, was debated by historians in the 1940s. At the time, several scholarly publications sought to settle the controversy. Historians Francisco Mostajo and Víctor M. Barriga eventually confirmed the crimson color of the standard, rejecting the blue version reconstructed by historian Víctor Benavente, which coincided with the color used in the city's sporting activities.

On 2 September 1940, Francisco Mostajo sent a formal letter to the mayor insisting on his position regarding the color of the standard. He based his claims on the Acta de la jura del Rey Carlos III of 11 August 1788. On 23 September of the same year, Father Víctor M. Barriga published in the Catholic newspaper El Deber a document describing the royal standard of Arequipa as found in the Acta of 3 September 1789. Both documents confirm that the city standard is crimson and that it originates in a colonial royal standard.

The standard is described as follows:

For the royal festivities of proclamation and oath to King Charles IV, the Illustrious Cabildo had ordered in advance a new crimson velvet standard, with the royal and city arms, trimmed with gold overlay, fastened to a finely worked pole ending in a spur-shaped tongue, from whose throat hung two crimson silk cords with tassels, making a handsome set. A canopy, dais cloths, cushions and benches with gold fringes and tassels completed it.

— Juramento, proclamación y fiestas populares que hicieron celebrar en esta ciudad el Intendente D. Antonio Álvarez y Jiménez y el Alférez Real D. Manuel Flores del Campo en homenaje al Rey Carlos IV, con motivo de su exaltación al trono de España

=== Coat of arms ===
Coat of arms of the city of Arequipa.

The coat of arms of Arequipa has a central figure: a griffin holding a flag inscribed "Carlos V" or "Del rey". The arms were granted to the city on 25 September 1541 by a real cédula issued by Charles V.

The Peruvian traditionalist Ricardo Palma, in Tradiciones Peruanas, offered an interpretation of the arrangement and meaning of the elements. Referring to a chronicler versed in heraldry, Palma wrote in the tradition "El ahijado de la providencia":

This democrat who writes understands nothing of heraldry, and so relies on the explanation given by a chronicler. He says that the inscription on the flag expresses the possession that the king took of Arequipa, and that by placing it not under the griffin's feet but in its hand, the monarch meant to show his esteem for the city, not trampling it as a vassal but offering it a hand as favored. If someone can explain it better, let him raise a finger.

— Ricardo Palma, Tradiciones Peruanas

=== Anthem ===
The city's anthem is the Himno del IV Centenario, with lyrics by Emilio Pardo del Valle and music by Aurelio Díaz Espinoza. They won the contest convened by the city council in 1939 for the fourth centenary of the city's foundation; the prize was awarded in 1940. Since then, the anthem has been sung at civic ceremonies held in the city.

== History ==
=== Pre-Inca era ===
Until shortly before the rise of the Inca Empire, the area of the modern city contained nomadic groups devoted to hunting, fishing and gathering. They domesticated animals, mainly camelids, and began to settle and practice agriculture. Over time, migration within the region led to the first settlements, many of them connected to the sea. These links created early communication routes and made the territory more accessible.

Irrigation canals were built in the Chili River valley, allowing cultivation on the plains and on the terraces along the river slopes. The Yarabaya and Chimba groups settled in the area now occupied by the city and, together with the Collagua and Cabana communities, developed an agrarian economy in the desert.

=== Inca era ===
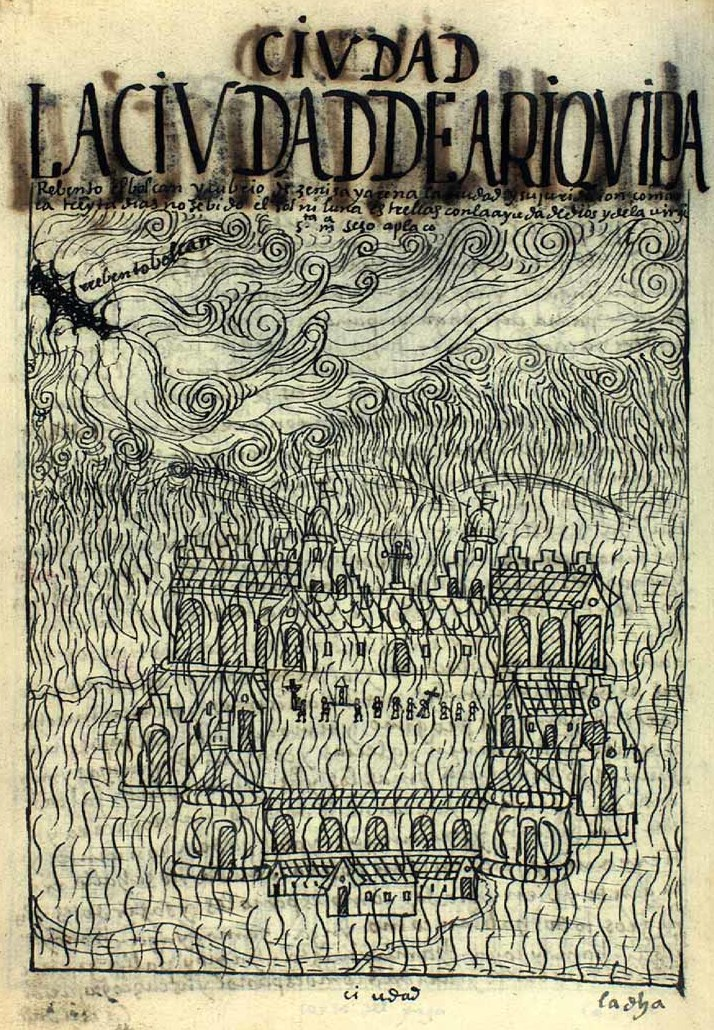
Arequipa in 1615, by Guamán Poma de Ayala.

When Mayta Cápac reached the plain of the Chili River, he did not found a city. Instead, he established mitma groups, relocated by the Inca state for administrative and control purposes, to guard and administer a frontier zone. The chronicles of Pedro Cieza de León contradict the idea that Mayta Cápac himself expanded Inca rule into the Arequipa valley, since that Inca died before the conquest of Kuntisuyu. His successor carried out these expeditions, although the process was interrupted by the Chanca threat, which besieged Viracocha in his capital. In response, Inca Yupanqui took command, adopted the title Pachacuti, defeated the Chancas and consolidated control over several regions, including the Chili valley.

A tradition derived from Garcilaso de la Vega holds that the Incas did found a town in the valley. This idea was popular among Arequipan historians in the 18th and early 19th centuries. Inca Garcilaso de la Vega wrote that Huayna Capac arrived in the Chili River valley around 1170 and established several settlements, including the hamlets or villages of Yanahuara, Cayma, Tiabaya, Paucarpata, Socabaya, Characato and Chiguata.

The establishment of mitma groups, however, did not amount to the founding of a town in the Hispanic sense. In Arequipa, Mayta Cápac carried out actions similar to those in Chuquisaca: he replaced the native population with mitma settlers.

=== Viceregal era ===
Arequipa was founded on 15 August 1540 by Juan de la Torre and Garcí Manuel de Carbajal, one of Francisco Pizarro's lieutenants, in the Chili River valley as the "Villa de la Asunción de Nuestra Señora del Valle Hermoso de Arequipa", in an area occupied by Indigenous settlements. After the foundation, town lots were distributed: Pizarro, the cabildo and the Order of Santo Domingo each received a whole block; the founders received quarter-block lots; and the main church received half a block, separated from nearby lots by the cathedral passage.

When the city was founded, it already had a cabildo, because the new settlement resulted from the relocation of Villa Hermosa de Camaná. Its name was partly preserved as Villa Hermosa de Arequipa, until Charles V of Germany and I of Spain elevated the villa to city status by royal decree issued at Fuensalida on 22 September 1541. Garcí Manuel de Carbajal managed the relocation, while Juan de la Torre was appointed to oversee the foundation. When the new alderman and mayor were designated, the posts went to Juan de la Torre, while Garcí Manuel de Carbajal returned to the new capital of Los Reyes to certify the foundation before the marquis.

The cabildo elected local authorities, who took office on the first day of the year. These included the mayors, the city procurator, the steward, the market inspector, the official responsible for estates of the deceased, and the administrator of the hospital and apothecary. Civil wars disrupted this order, as rebel groups made appointments in favor of their supporters. From 1553, by order of Viceroy Martín Enríquez de Almanza, the lottery system known as insaculación was introduced, under which a mayor "of residents" and another "of soldiers" were elected; these were later replaced by a mayor "of residents" and one "of citizens".

By decree of Philip II of Spain, the accountant, treasurer and royal officials of the treasury were allowed to serve simultaneously as aldermen. This produced overlapping powers and conflict. To avoid such disputes, the offices of standard-bearer and alderman were sold and made perpetual, a system that remained in force until independence. The city gained relevance and received numerous distinctions within the Viceroyalty of Peru. Among the phrases of praise found in literature is one in La Galatea by Miguel de Cervantes, where the Spanish poet Diego Martínez de Rivera, while in Arequipa, refers to the city with the phrase "In Arequipa, eternal spring".

Among the first public works were the main church, the town hall, the bridge over the Chili River and the monastery of Nuestra Señora de Gracia. In 1609, following a petition sent to Pope Paul V on 20 July 1609, a papal bull of 6 January 1612 authorized the demarcation of the diocese of Arequipa. King Philip III of Spain entrusted the mission to Viceroy Juan de Mendoza y Luna.

During the 17th and 18th centuries, the city underwent notable consolidation and growth. Economically, Arequipa became a commercial link between the agricultural production of its valleys and regional mining trade, especially the Caylloma mines and the Potosí circuit. The valleys of Vítor, Siguas and Majes supplied the city with wheat, maize, wine and aguardiente, products that brought it renown and commercial dynamism.

Urban and architectural life in the 17th century was marked by the splendor of religious architecture, with churches such as San Agustín, La Merced and San Francisco, as well as large convents such as Santa Catalina and Santa Teresa, which were not only religious centers but also spaces of sociability and female cultural life. The 18th century, by contrast, saw a boom in civil architecture, with manor houses and palaces such as Casa del Moral and Casa Tristán del Pozo, built in sillar stone with Baroque portals that gave the city stylistic unity and monumentality.

Cultural life accompanied this development. Theatre contracts for performances in the city are documented as early as 1637, and education expanded during the 18th century, reflected in high literacy rates and in the activity of schools run by religious orders and the Colegio de Educandas, institutions that trained much of the local Creole elite. A literary and chronicle tradition flourished in parallel, especially the work of Ventura Travada y Córdova, which offers a detailed portrait of Arequipan religiosity and social life in his time. Female convents, particularly Santa Catalina and Santa Teresa, became centers of sociability, written culture and artistic patronage.

The 18th century was also marked by natural disasters and reconstruction. Earlier earthquakes, such as the 1582 quake and the 1600 eruption of Huaynaputina, had already forced rebuilding, but the 1784 earthquake destroyed much of the city in that century. Reconstruction in sillar consolidated Arequipa's distinctive architectural profile and produced richly decorated Baroque portals. This construction process, together with the maturity reached in civil architecture, made the city a reference point for the mestizo Baroque of the southern Andes.

In political and social terms, Arequipa remained relatively stable during the Indigenous and mestizo uprisings that shook other regions of the viceroyalty. The local elite, loyal to the Crown, organized militias and supported royal campaigns, reinforcing the city's image as loyal and contributing to its recognition as a bastion of stability in southern Peru. The stance drew on an earlier tradition of public adherence to the Spanish Crown in the 16th and 17th centuries. In the 18th century, this loyalty, known as fidelismo, was expressed by figures such as Francisco de Paula Quirós, Mariano Eduardo de Rivero y Ustáriz, Nicolás Fernández and José Miguel de Lastarria. During the uprising of Túpac Amaru II, the city equipped a column of troops at its own expense and helped break the siege of La Paz, earning the title "Restorative Province of the Collao". For these services, Charles IV of Spain issued a royal decree at San Lorenzo on 5 December 1805 ordering that it be styled "Most Faithful".

On 16 November 1818, the city council was granted the form of address "Most Excellent". The distinction was granted in view of reports by Hipólito Unanue, deputy for the province of Arequipa, and the city council, concerning Arequipa's participation in defense of the royal cause during the 1809 uprising in La Paz.

=== Independence ===
During the independence process, Arequipa's situation reflected the civil conflict that affected many Peruvian provinces. Its geography and location, for example, were decisive when the rebel troops of Mateo Pumacahua entered the city. Despite a brief period of euphoria, these forces did not remain for long, and viceregal power was maintained until the Battle of Ayacucho, reflecting the complexity of civil war in the region.

Unlike other Peruvian cities, especially Lima, Arequipa remained publicly loyal to the Spanish Crown and closely followed the directives of Spanish monarchs. This loyalty, known as fidelismo, had defenders such as Francisco de Paula Quiroz and Mariano de Rivero. In 1805 the city received the title "Most Faithful" by royal charter. From its Spanish foundation and for three centuries, Arequipa maintained a population predominantly of Spanish origin. This demography strengthened its fidelity to Spain, as did a social structure dominated by Spaniards and supported by high society. Its geographical location also insulated it from independence movements and distanced it from major Indigenous centers.

During this period, viceregal authorities adopted a tolerant stance toward the free-thinking tendencies of Arequipans. One expression was the creation of the Academia Lauretana of Sciences and Arts on 10 December 1821. Directed by Evaristo Tadeo Gómez Sánchez, the academy was a center of free thought and introduced the department's first printing press. Shortly after its foundation, prominent members such as Francisco Xavier de Luna Pizarro, Aparicio Gómez Sánchez and others openly supported the emancipatory cause.

There is debate among historians about the first declaration of independence: some hold that the first act was signed in Supe or Ica, while most agree that it was the cabildo of Supe in April 1820. Historian Agustín de la Puente described the period as a paradox:

While the south, where the precursor revolutions had begun with Túpac Amaru, remained under royal rule, the north, with fewer prior revolutionary movements, became independent earlier. A curious historical phenomenon.

— José Agustín de la Puente

During the South American wars of independence, Arequipa became an important stage in the struggle for autonomy. Brigadier General Juan Bautista de Lavalle y Sagasosa led the region in civil and military matters, while Bishop José Sebastián de Goyeneche y Barreda guided the ecclesiastical sphere; both represented pillars of Spanish royalism in the city.

The Capitulation of Ayacucho, signed by Viceroy José de la Serna, marked a decisive turn. Its terms, however, were rejected by authorities of the Audiencia of Cusco. Against this background, Pío Tristán y Moscoso, born in Arequipa in 1773, was named the new viceroy of Peru in the city. His military career had included changing loyalties, from accompanying his father in the campaign against Túpac Amaru to serving in the Spanish army at the Battle of Roussillon and in royalist campaigns in Upper Peru.

After the Capitulation of Ayacucho, however, Pío Tristán changed his position. Despite his rank and service in the royalist army, he chose to detach himself from Spanish power and issued from Arequipa a proclamation recognizing Peru's new system of government. Sucre's notification of the capitulation reached Arequipa on 23 December 1824. The Municipality of Arequipa, after analyzing it, declared its adherence to the victory of Ayacucho and recognized Peruvian independence. José Gonzales Vigil delivered Sucre's communication to the municipality on 2 January 1825; the municipality responded with an agreement dated 30 December, recognizing the new system of government.

General Francisco de Paula Otero, appointed as the highest authority in Arequipa under the new political system, arrived in the city on 12 January 1825. On 6 February 1825 a solemn session was held, in which civil, ecclesiastical and military authorities swore allegiance to independence, officially sealing Arequipa's incorporation into the Republic of Peru.

=== Republican era ===
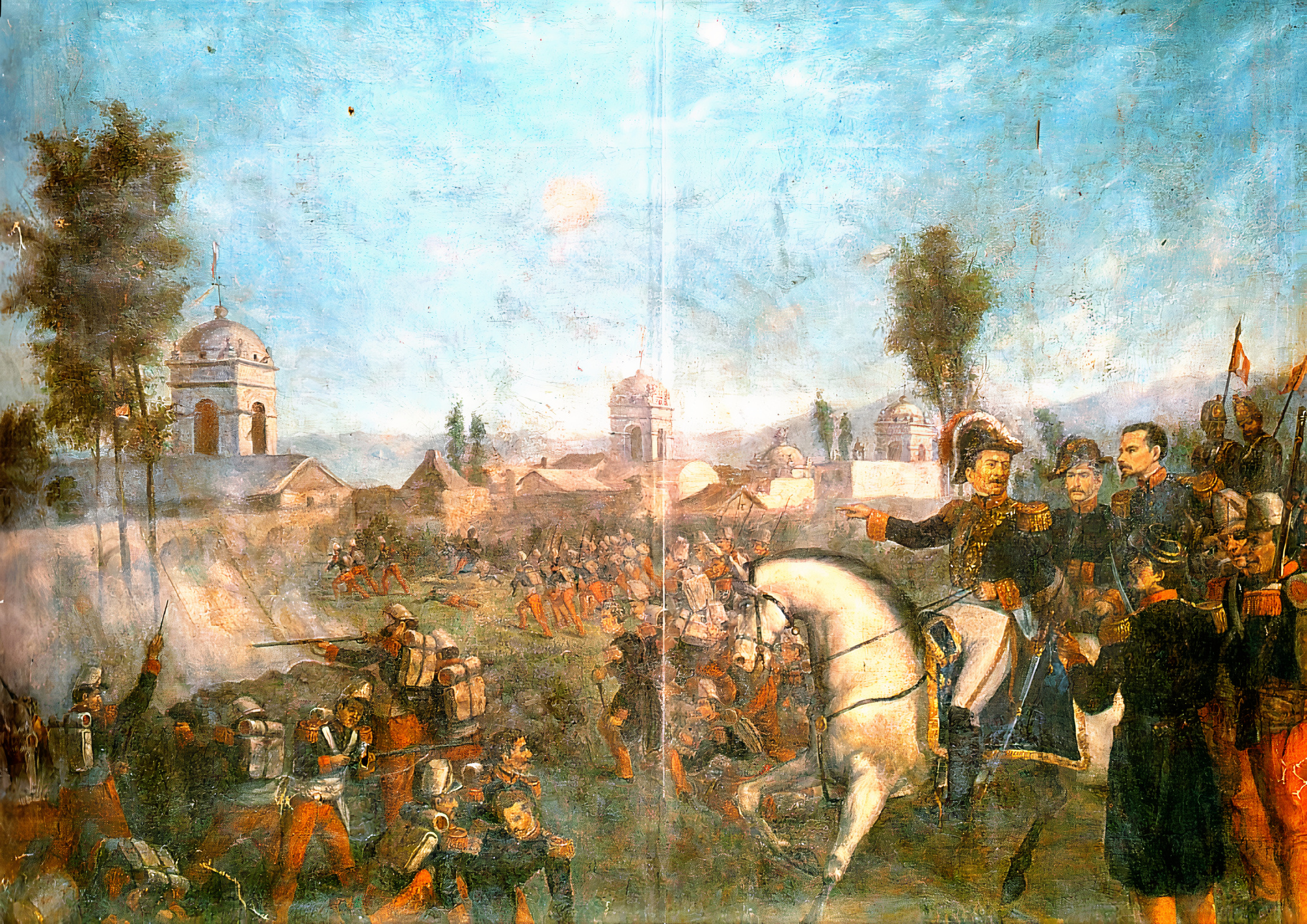
Capture of Arequipa, 1856. Marshal Ramón Castilla enters Arequipa to recover control of the city from the army of General Vivanco.

After independence was proclaimed, the area of the Intendancy of Arequipa was established as a department by decree of 26 May 1822. During the Congress of 1826 and the Constituent Assembly of 1827, the Arequipan and Lauretanan Francisco Xavier de Luna Pizarro presided. Under Simón Bolívar, Arequipa became a center of opposition to the Liberator's dictatorial tendencies after his victory at the Battle of Ayacucho. Arequipans such as Domingo Tristán, Benito Laso and Juan Gualberto Valdivia openly opposed the Bolivarian life constitution. At that time, the Academia Lauretana promoted the creation of the Colegio Nacional de la Independencia Americana and the National University of San Agustín in 1827.

In 1835, General Luis José de Orbegoso moved his administration from Lima to Arequipa in search of support from Bolivian president Andrés de Santa Cruz against Agustín Gamarra and Felipe Santiago Salaverry. The key confrontations between Salaverry and the Confederation forces were the battles of Uchumayo and Socabaya in February 1836, with victories for Salaverry and Santa Cruz respectively. On 18 February, Salaverry and his closest collaborators were executed in the Plaza de Armas.

In the republican era, a decree by General Orbegoso renamed the department and its capital as the "Department of the Law" and the "Heroic city of the free people of Arequipa", respectively. The transfer of Orbegoso's government to Arequipa in January 1835 led Felipe Santiago Salaverry to proclaim himself Supreme Chief in Lima, arguing that the country had no leader because Orbegoso was absent from the capital. With Salaverry's insurrection in Lima, Orbegoso had to centralize his government in Arequipa, the only city that recognized his presidential authority. In response to the Peru-Bolivian Confederation, Chile sent a military expedition in 1837, which arrived in Arequipa under Manuel Blanco Encalada. A peace treaty was signed at Paucarpata, but Chile did not ratify it and sent a new expedition in 1838 under General Manuel Bulnes to support Ramón Castilla and other Peruvian leaders against Santa Cruz.

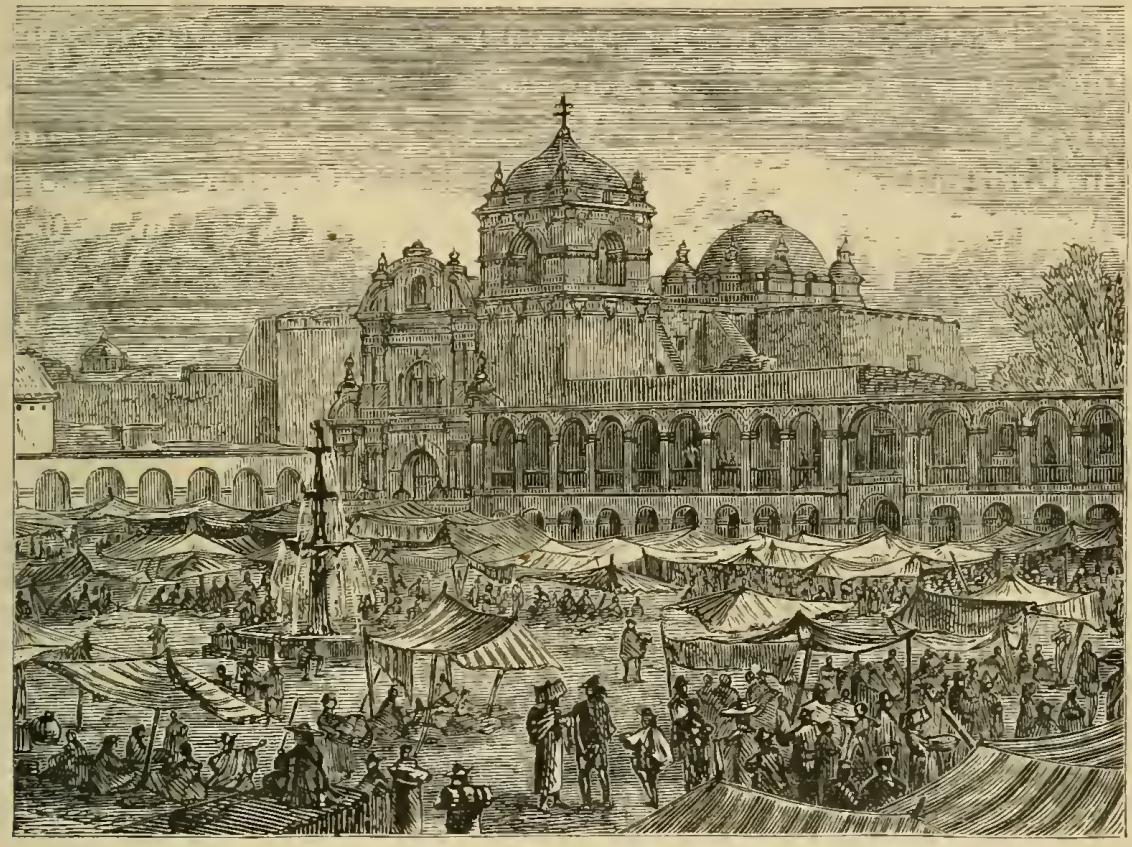
Grand plaza and market of Arequipa in the 1860s, from Peru; incidents of travel and exploration in the land of the Incas (1877).

Over the years, Arequipa was the epicenter of several military uprisings. In 1843, General Manuel Ignacio de Vivanco was proclaimed supreme leader, but his government ended after the Battle of Carmen Alto in 1844. In 1854, General Ramón Castilla emerged from Arequipa as provisional president and consolidated power. He later faced opposition, especially from Vivanco, who rebelled again in 1856. Forces under Miguel de San Román confronted Vivanco at Paucarpata in 1857.

In 1868 an earthquake caused enormous damage in the city. In the mid-1860s, Ephraim George Squier traveled through much of Peru and wrote a book describing his journey. He wrote of Arequipa:

Probably no other inland city of South America was so well built before the earthquake; its houses, massive in structure and vaulted in roof, though rarely more than one story high, were built of hard volcanic stone, a style adopted after the earthquake of 1821 as a safeguard against similar disasters. The cathedral, now badly damaged, was vast and imposing and of a singular architectural style. Its inhabitants considered it one of the most beautiful in the world. It had a great bell, cast in the city itself, said to be larger than that of St Paul's Cathedral in London. Its population was around fifty thousand, many of them Indigenous. In science and art it was the most important city in Peru. Most prominent figures in modern Peruvian history, whether in literature, art, commerce, war or politics, were from Arequipa. It suffered greatly in the country's political struggles and, in December 1867, was bombarded for three days by President Prado.

— E. G. Squier, Peru. Incidents of travel and exploration in the land of the Incas (1877), pp. 223-224

==== War of the Pacific ====
On 17 April 1879, Chilean captain Enrique Simpson Baeza arrived at the port of Mollendo with two ships and landed troops to loot goods, destroy vessels and damage the port. The local population responded with the few weapons it had, inflicting casualties on the attackers and forcing them to withdraw. In retaliation, Simpson ordered a twenty-minute bombardment of the town, damaging houses, the pier and warehouses, and making Mollendo the first Peruvian port attacked in the conflict. He then imposed a blockade and demanded the departure of foreign ships, but not before looting goods from a French vessel. These acts were denounced by the consular corps of Mollendo and Arequipa, as well as by the French vice-consul, who documented the theft committed by Chilean forces.

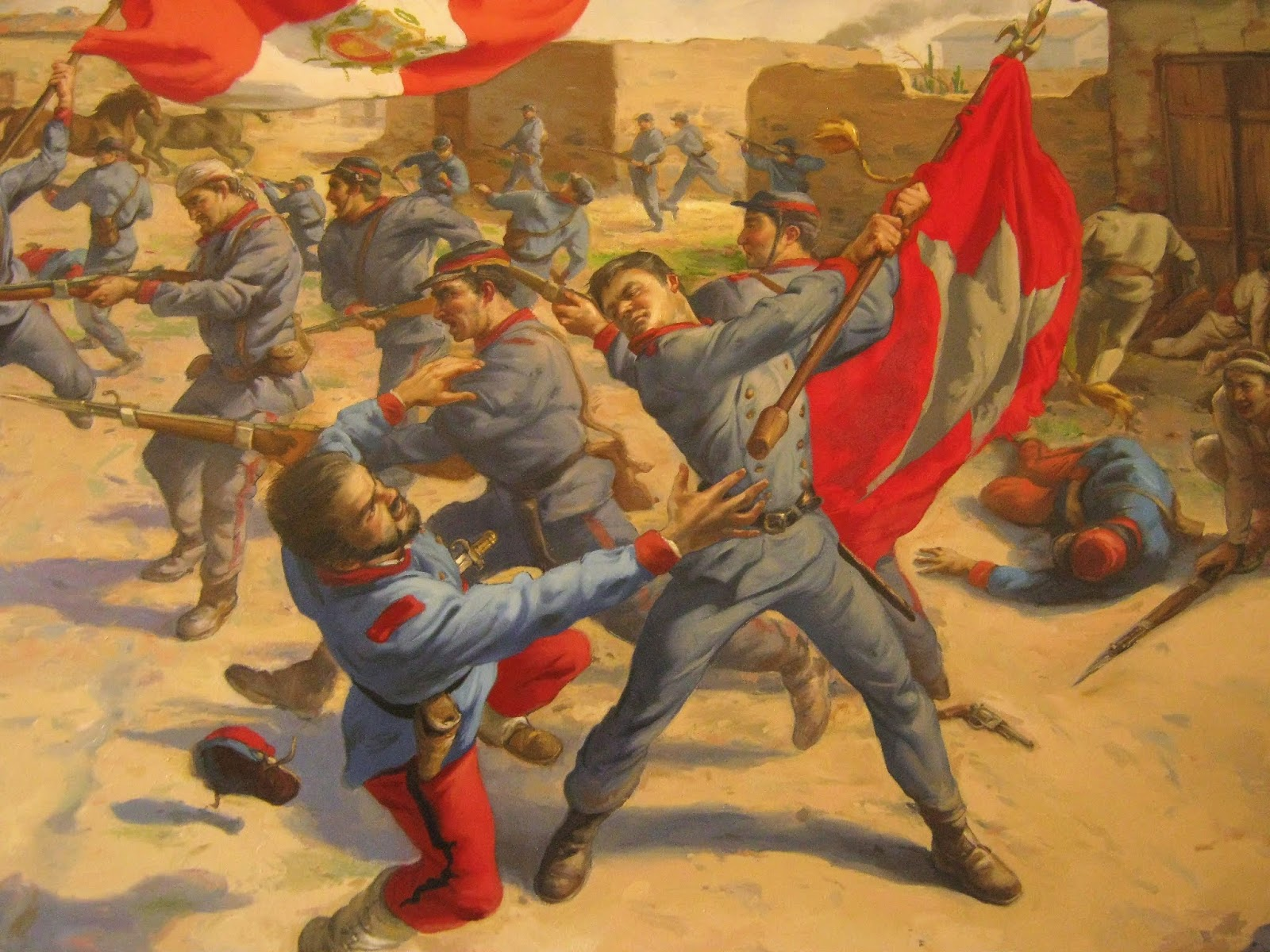
Mariano Santos Mateo, by Gustavo González Echeverría.

During the Battle of Tarapacá, the "Guardias de Arequipa" battalion fought with determination; Mariano Santos Mateo, a Cuzco-born member of this Arequipan corps, captured the Chilean standard of the 2nd Line Regiment.

In March 1880, during the Expedition to Mollendo, Chilean troops landed because of the limited number of Peruvian defenders in the area. They looted the customs house and destroyed the Mollendo railway. Later, Arequipans are recorded among those who fought at the Battle of Alto de la Alianza in 1880. Colonel Carlos Llosa, for example, led the Zepita Battalion in the fighting.

When war broke out with Chile, which has robbed us of the best lives of our brothers, Carlos Llosa was serving as subprefect of Mollendo and was the first to exchange fire with the Cochrane and a Chilean gunboat, behaving with the courage that earned him the congratulations of President Prado and of the army's leading commanders. Llosa longed to deserve a post at the center of operations and obtained transfer to Arica, where he was temporarily appointed commander of the "Zepita" after then-Colonel Cáceres was made commander general of the 1st Division. With that brilliant army corps, a model of discipline and courage, Carlos Llosa went to the Battle of Alto de la Alianza; and as he promised his comrades at the beginning of the combat, he fought inch by inch for the laurel of victory for the homeland and won only the glory of heroes, watering the battlefield with his blood and yielding his life in the flower of his age beside the national flag.

— P. Bacigalupi, El Perú ilustrado, Nos. 157-181 (1890), p. 594

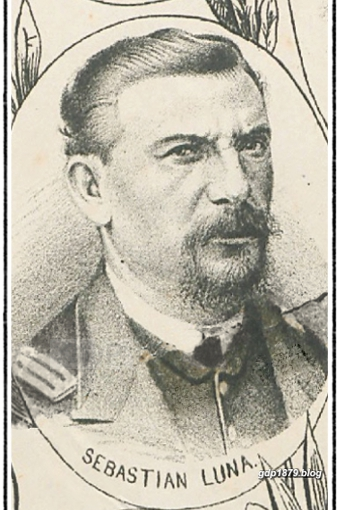
Colonel Sebastián Luna Bustamante, commander of the Cazadores del Misti No. 15 Battalion during the Battle of Alto de la Alianza.

The Arequipan commander Sebastián Luna Bustamante led the "Cazadores del Misti No. 15" battalion. On 25 May 1880, the eve of the Battle of Alto de la Alianza, the battalion participated in a failed night attack on Chilean forces camped in Quebrada Honda. On the morning of 26 May 1880, after the tired return to their trenches from the allied night incursions, the Battle of Tacna took place on the heights near the city. The Cazadores del Misti No. 15 fought fiercely, giving and asking no quarter. According to documents in the Velarde archive, its roll included four chiefs, 34 officers and 392 enlisted men, as well as 38 pack mules and no horses. The corps took positions in the front line between the Peruvian Zepita No. 2 and Arica No. 27 battalions.

After the Allied defeat at Alto de la Alianza, the Lima campaign began, in which Chilean forces landed in the capital without passing through Arequipa. Physician Augusto Pérez Araníbar also participated in the war: he joined the expedition that carried medicines to Arica while it was under naval siege, and later went to Lima to treat the wounded from the battles there.

Lizardo Montero arrived in Arequipa on 31 August 1882 and declared it the capital of Peru. He also convened a National Congress on 28 April 1883.

From one night to the next Arequipa became the "Capital of Peru": with a president and escort in the "palace", ministers and secretaries in their offices, the high military command in its barracks. An old and repeated dream became reality, although with the air of farce and tragedy: the government did not exercise power over the whole national territory, whose strategic areas were militarily occupied by the enemy.

— Máximo Neira, Historia General de Arequipa

Montero's government had a "National Congress" installed on 22 April 1883 in the cloisters of Colegio Independencia and the National University of San Agustín. It had military backing from all men aged 20 to 60, forming an army of 4,000 men and 8,000 to 10,000 national guardsmen, and economic support based on levies and contributions imposed on both the economic elite and the southern agricultural districts. Peruvian forces in Arequipa, however, rebelled against Montero's authority. On 25 October 1883, a popular and military revolt overthrew Montero's government in Arequipa; he withdrew to La Paz, and Chilean troops under José Velásquez occupied the city on 29 October, when it was handed over by the city's diplomatic corps in the context of the Capture of Arequipa.

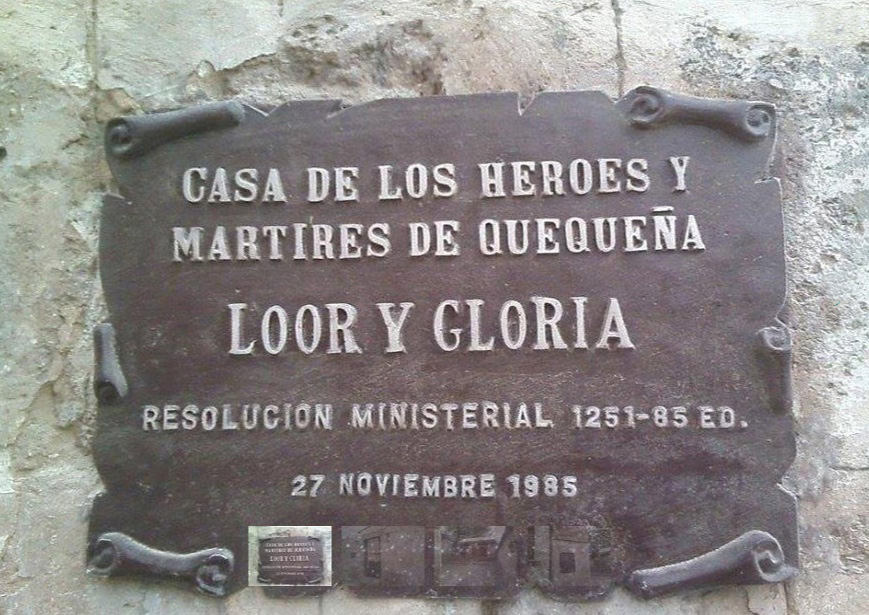
Homage to the martyrs of Quequeña.

On 24 November, Arequipa commemorates the Martyrs of Quequeña and Yarabamba, executed in 1883 during the Chilean occupation in the War of the Pacific. After repeated abuses, looting and assaults by a group of Chilean soldiers, local residents killed two soldiers. In retaliation, Chilean troops captured around 60 residents and, although many had not participated in the events, executed six and flogged others. The events are remembered as an act of resistance and dignity; the executed men were recognized as national heroes in 1984, and 24 November was established as a commemorative day. In 1884, the Revolution of Arequipa of 1884 occurred.

==== 20th century ====
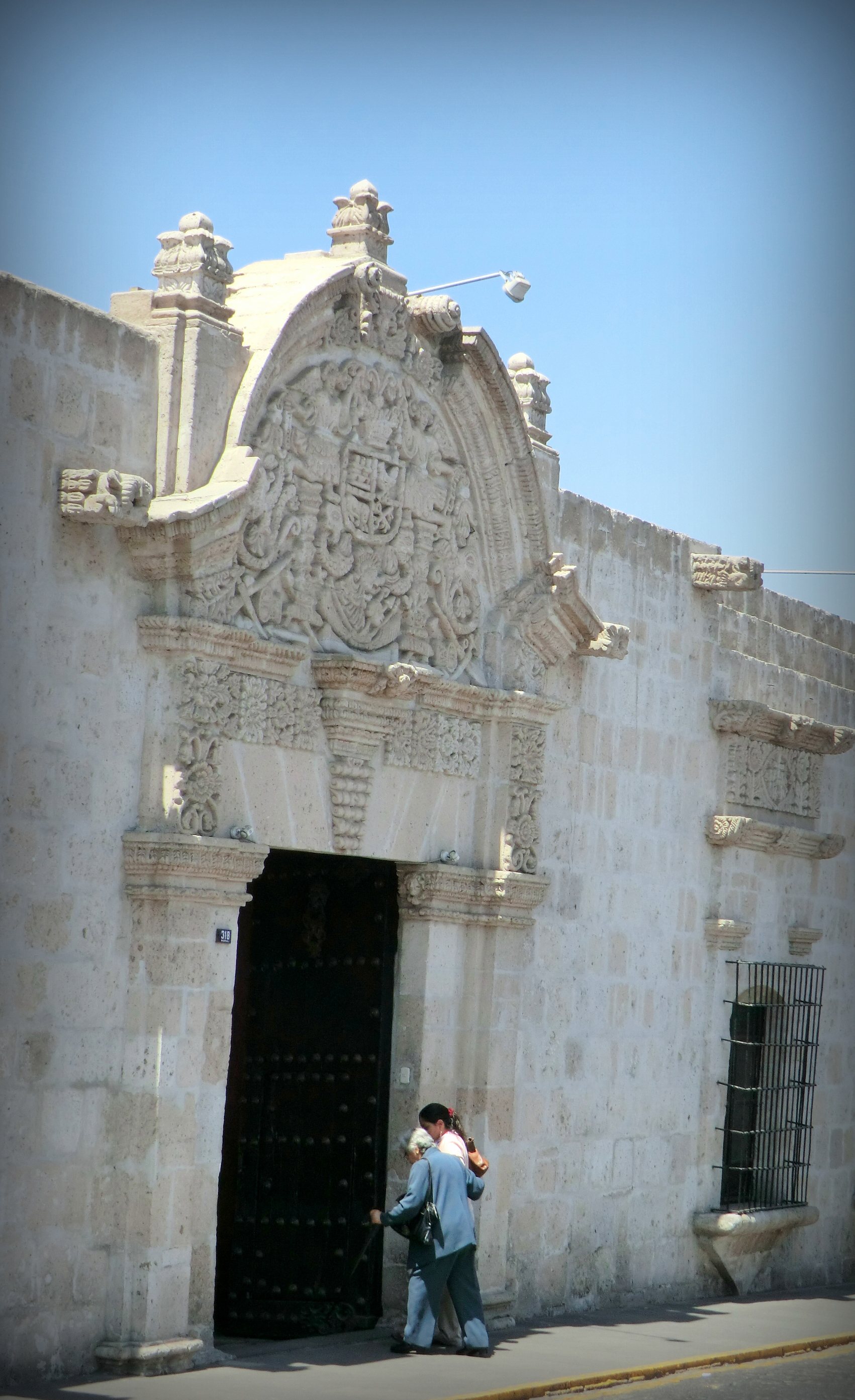
Casa del Moral, also known as Casona Williams, was commissioned by field master Manuel Santos de San Pedro, originally from Valladolid. Construction was completed between 1735 and 1740.

In the 20th century Arequipa inherited the damage of past earthquakes, such as those of 1868, 1878 and 1913, and underwent socioeconomic and political transformations. These earlier earthquakes had caused considerable damage to the city's infrastructure and social fabric. With the turn of the century, growing international demand led landlords and caudillos to alter their practices for exploiting the Indigenous peasantry in Puno. The resulting economic adjustment helped establish Arequipa as a center of middle classes, artisans and professionals by the early 20th century. As a result, the city developed a social structure influenced by urban bourgeois sectors with liberal and democratic tendencies, reinforced by its historical legacy and by the role of families, industrial sectors and unions.

Arequipa was also affected by the century's political turmoil. On 22 August 1930, Luis Sánchez Cerro took control, forcing President Augusto B. Leguía from office. On 27 October 1948, General Manuel A. Odría established a junta after deposing President José Luis Bustamante y Rivero. Beyond military movements, Arequipa was also a center of civic resistance. Two demonstrations against the Odría regime are especially notable: one in June 1950 and another that dominated the scene in December 1955.

In material progress, the 20th century in Arequipa saw infrastructure advances. The construction of the Arequipa-Islay railway, directed by Henry Meiggs, marked a turning point; it later connected with routes to Cusco, Juliaca and Puno. The first telegraph system opened in 1908, followed by an aqueduct in 1914. The 1930s were prolific in infrastructure, culminating in 1940 with the opening of Rodríguez Ballón International Airport. Arequipa's industrial park was officially established on 10 January 1966 through Law 15923, which boosted regional manufacturing, increased manufacturing activity and diversified the city's economic base.

==== 21st century ====
In the early 21st century, Arequipa faced both cultural milestones and significant challenges. The historic center was inscribed as a World Heritage Site, underlining its cultural value. On 23 June 2001, however, the city suffered an 8.4-magnitude earthquake, one of the strongest recorded worldwide since 1900. The event seriously damaged many historic buildings.

After the earthquake, emergency measures were implemented and damage was assessed, with emphasis on public safety and restoration of damaged heritage. The architectural identity of the Historic Centre of Arequipa was prioritized, and areas such as Mercaderes Street and the San Lázaro quarter were pedestrianized. The opening of shopping centers such as Mall Aventura Plaza, Parque Lambramani and Real Plaza in 2010, along with modernization of Rodríguez Ballón International Airport, marked a change in the city's commercial and transport infrastructure.

Between 2010 and 2015, Arequipa experienced economic growth, partly because of mining projects such as Cerro Verde. This growth strengthened its position in southern Peru. By the end of the decade, however, the region was already showing signs of a slow decline in competitiveness, with important investment projects stalled. This vulnerability was sharply aggravated by the COVID-19 pandemic in Arequipa from 2020 onward.

The health crisis reached its most critical point in the region between July and August 2020, causing the collapse of the local health system. It was accompanied by severe economic contraction, with a projected fall in regional GDP of up to 14%. The institutional response was criticized for its lack of coherence, leaving economic reactivation largely to private initiative and a growing informal sector. The crisis also worsened social problems such as family violence and civic disengagement, in a context of weakening civil organizations.

Despite these challenges, the city has continued to address socio-environmental problems, including water management and urban planning. Its transport system has evolved through bus modernization and the promotion of sustainable mobility, including the introduction of electric buses. Cleanup of the Chili River has been another central goal, with wastewater treatment plants being implemented, although the process remains ongoing. Water intake, however, continues to face complications, including ravines activated by volcanic ash in 2024.

== Politics ==
Arequipa's political history has two broad phases. The first is the colonial city, whose population cooperated with viceregal power. The second began with the republican system, when the city and its political representatives tended toward liberal, republican and nationalist positions. According to historian Jorge Basadre, Arequipa became one of the country's major political stages.

=== Colonial period ===
During the viceregal period, Arequipa did not have the highest-ranking official status, but it gained influence through its economic role. It took advantage of its position at a continental crossroads: the silver route in colonial times and the wool route after independence. This position allowed it to accumulate administrative, commercial and industrial functions and to forge local social classes committed to the city's future and service to the Spanish Crown. The colonial period differed from the republican phase: the city had a largely Hispanic and white population, proud of the titles granted by the king of Spain and willing to cooperate with the Spanish Crown.

=== Independence ===
In the early republic, liberal politicians such as Francisco Xavier de Luna Pizarro and Mariano José de Arce emerged, and their democratic and anti-monarchical ideology was expressed within the Sociedad Patriótica. The city's political outlook therefore showed a liberal, republican and Peruvian spirit, since it also opposed the political positions of San Martín and Bolívar.

During this period, Arequipa had a particular role in the emergence of parties and political tendencies central to Peru. Unlike most cities, Arequipa contributed political figures to national politics and also served as the stage on which several political movements of national relevance arose during the republican period.

=== Republican period ===
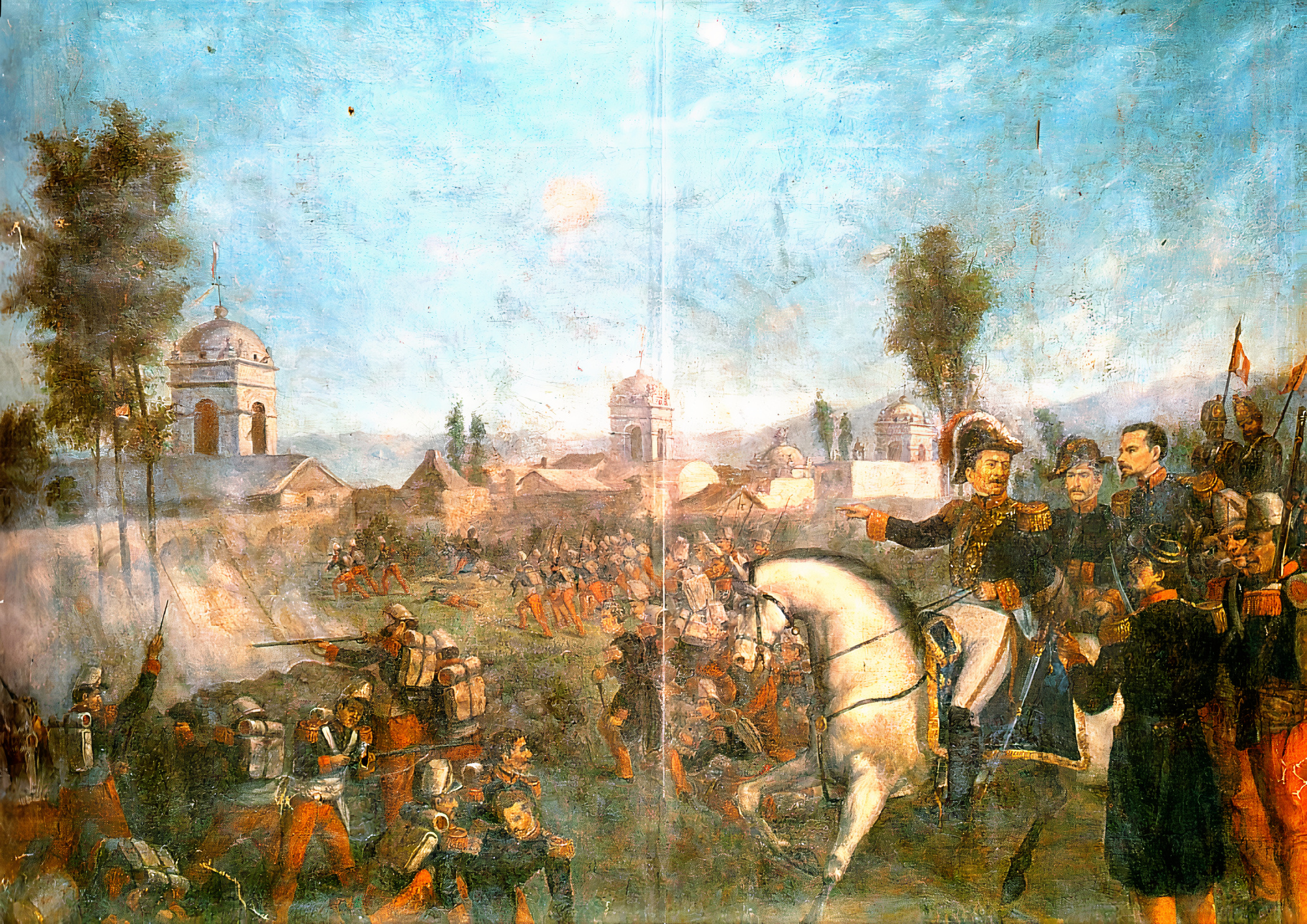
Revolution of 1856. From exile in Chile, Vivanco conspired by letter against Castilla's second government; after being proclaimed supreme chief by a revolution that began in Arequipa on 1 November 1856, he returned to lead it.

During the republic, Arequipa enjoyed political and economic importance and came to be seen as a kind of "second capital" for Peru. The city served as a counterweight to Lima's centralizing power, defending the economic interests of southern Peru. On this point, Jorge Basadre emphasized Arequipa's representativeness in defining the country's republican political course.

Basadre wrote:

Arequipa was the representative city of the republic, as Lima was the representative city of the colony and Cusco the representative city of the Inca empire.

— Jorge Basadre, Sultanismo, corrupción y dependencia en el Perú republicano

It is widely accepted that Arequipa set the political tone of national leadership. This historical phenomenon was based on Arequipa's revolutionary cycle, studied by Basadre, Belaunde, Polar and Bustamante y Rivero.

During this period, economic, political and cultural opposition emerged between Lima and Arequipa. The Arequipa region became a regionalist political space in constant opposition to the national capital and to the centralizing policy of the traditional Lima oligarchy. From 1834, a series of political movements developed in Arequipa to influence the course of the republic. The city was described as a "collective caudillo of Peru", with armed mobilizations accompanied by the ringing of church bells.

==== Uprisings ====
Until 1867, Arequipa was "a pistol aimed at the heart of Lima", the collective caudillo of the country. The already achieved mestizaje of its population was sharpened by geographical isolation. Arequipa was separated from the coast by a vast desert and from other important cities by mountains and pampas, so its life was singular.

— Jorge Basadre, El Perú republicano y los fundamentos de su emancipación

Throughout Arequipa's political history, multiple uprisings earned the city the nickname "Lion of the South". According to Leslie Bethell of the University of Cambridge, "if Arequipa was the capital of liberalism, the other regions of Peru promoted their own interests only through their ideologies". Other authors conclude that the revolutions were not driven by personal interests or by the politicians who encouraged them, but by a passion for law and justice, religious faith and honor.

Bethell emphasized the importance of the Arequipan revolutions:

None of the numerous Aprista insurrections over three decades, including that of Trujillo in 1932, assured such great political influence as these three movements that arose in Arequipa.

— Leslie Bethell, The Cambridge History of Latin America: Latin America since 1930

Arequipa's historical image as a center of political mobilization rests on numerous recorded uprisings. Various authors point out that many of these revolutions, some national in scope, responded to tensions between regional interests and the policies of the central government, especially around local autonomy. The principal revolutions recorded in the city include:

- Revolution of 1834
- Revolution of 1835
- Revolution of 1841
- Revolution of 1844
- Revolution of 1851
- Revolution of 1854
- Revolution of 1856
- Revolution of 1857
- Revolution of 1858
- Revolution of 1865
- Revolution of 1867
- Revolution of 1883
- Revolution of 1884
- Revolution of 1930
- Revolution of 1931
- Revolution of 1950
- Rebellion of 1950
- Revolution of 1955
- Revolution of 2002

From the second decade of the 19th century to the end of that decade, a transitional society formed in Peru. At the same time, the economic pillars on which the city depended, wool manufacture and the Southern Railway, began to decline. For this and other reasons, Arequipa began to produce political leaders from a growing middle class of professionals, intellectuals and technocrats, who participated in defending legality and economic stability. During this period, the city experienced significant population growth and prominent political participation, consolidating itself as the country's second city and as a sustained challenger to Lima.

==== 20th and 21st centuries ====
Intellectual groups such as the "Grupo Aquelarre" emerged during this transitional period. Their demands were limited to political decentralization and were detached from demands for social justice and economic reform, such as agrarian reform; these movements weakened after the Great Depression. Leaders such as Víctor Andrés Belaúnde and José Luis Bustamante y Rivero also appeared and left their mark as constitutionalists in the early 1930s. From 1945 to 1948, Bustamante y Rivero served as president of Peru.

In 1950, lawyer Francisco Mostajo, a prominent Arequipan liberal since 1901, led a revolution in Arequipa against Odría. In 1956, the Arequipan Fernando Belaúnde Terry obtained a large share of the middle-class vote, and in 1962 and 1963 Belaúnde's Popular Action, supported by another party of Arequipan origin, the Christian Democracy, was strong enough to win the presidency of Peru. Arequipa's political course began with a new national bourgeoisie that challenged the existing bourgeois elite in Peru, in a context of a large and growing stratum of people with professional, administrative and commercial interests.

From the 1900s, the rebellious Arequipan spirit re-emerged in the writing of a group of intellectuals, a new generation of liberals marked by anticlericalism in a strongly Catholic society and by opposition to the country's economic and political centralism. This opposition helped shape a constitutionalist position in the 1930s and the later adoption of Christian Democratic ideologies in the 1940s and 1950s. Lawyers and the church exerted strong influence in Arequipan politics, as did the middle class, which gained greater participation as southern Peru's economic prosperity declined.

These new interests took clearer political form in the interior of the country, where the strongest political structure was the city of Arequipa. Its national electoral potential was reflected in the strength of Fernando Belaúnde Terry's candidacy in the 1956 presidential election. The southern region, dominated by Arequipa, has a long history of separatism from the Republic of Peru, and Arequipa's 20th-century upper class retained a distinct regional identity.

== Political and administrative organization ==
=== Seat of the Constitutional Court ===
The Constitutional Court is the supreme autonomous body for constitutional interpretation and review. Its autonomy is defined only by the Constitution and its own organic law, and it may hold decentralized sessions anywhere in the republic with the majority agreement of its members.

During the Constituent Assembly of 1978 it was decided that Arequipa would be the seat of the then "Court of Constitutional Guarantees", as stated in Article 304 of Peru's 1979 Constitution: "The Court of Constitutional Guarantees has its seat in the city of Arequipa". The decision was rooted in the decentralist project proposed by Manuel Seoane Corrales, who had originally proposed that Arequipa host the Superior Court of Justice. With the promulgation of the 1993 Constitution, the "Constitutional Court" replaced the former "Court of Constitutional Guarantees", and its seat was set in Arequipa under its organic law.

=== Local administration ===
==== Provincial municipality ====
The Provincial Municipality of Arequipa exercises authority over the territory of Arequipa Province and the district of the same name. It promotes local public services and formulates and approves several development plans, both urban and economic, in line with national and regional guidelines.

Its main functions include formulating and approving the Territorial Conditioning Plan, the Metropolitan Development Plan, the Urban Development Plan, the Concerted Development Plan, the Economic Development Plan and other instruments, in accordance with national and regional plans for all districts of the province in which the city is located. The Municipal Council is the city government's highest body; it consists of the mayor, who presides over it, and councilors elected by direct suffrage. The mayor's office is the municipality's executive body; the mayor is its legal representative and highest administrative authority. Within the province's administration, the district mayors of the province and metropolitan area form the Provincial Local Coordination Council. Its main task is to propose priority public investments in provincial infrastructure.

=== Arequipa Metropolitan Area ===
The formation and regulation of the Arequipa Metropolitan Area (AMA) is the responsibility of the Municipal Planning Institute (IMPLA). This body manages provincial territorial planning, supervises urban planning and is responsible for territorial conditioning. The Metropolitan Development Plan establishes the guidelines and regulations for the AMA. In force since 2016, it guides metropolitan development until 2025. Municipalities within the AMA must comply with this regulation in matters of urban development, heritage protection and conservation of non-urbanizable areas.

==== Boundaries and extent ====
For the 2016-2025 period, the AMA covers 50,246 hectares, divided into an urban area of 37,107 hectares and a reserved urban expansion area of 3,818 hectares.

The AMA is delimited as follows:

- To the north: the terraces of Yura, the casona opposite La Escocesa plant and Pozo Fierro Viejo, the Yura countryside, a polygonal line parallel to 150 m from kilometer 62 of the road leaving Arequipa, following the 2800-meter contour until reaching the Chili River, crossing it in a straight line until meeting the 2800-meter contour again in Selva Alegre district, and continuing through the Chiguata valley and the traditional town of Chiguata.
- To the south: the boundary follows the natural ravine passing by the bridge of the La Joya drinking-water works, continuing through the ravine and the ridgeline of the hills south of Congata, Cerro Huairondo in Tiabaya, Cruz La Rinconada in Tiabaya, and passing through Yarabamba and Sogay.
- To the east: through Chiguata, following the Socabaya River, and along the ridgelines of hills near Sabandía, Characato, Mollebaya, Quequeña and Sogay.
- To the west: through the Yura countryside, surrounding the Yura cement factory, following the path of a steep ravine and the ridgelines of nearby hills until reaching the Chili River slope.

==== Metropolitan districts ====
The AMA integrates twenty-one conurbated districts. Nineteen of them have metropolitan status, excluding Yarabamba and Chiguata. The urban area consists of the spatial integrity of the districts of Arequipa, José Luis Bustamante y Rivero, Sachaca and Yanahuara, and the conurbated or semi-conurbated urban areas of Alto Selva Alegre, Cayma, Characato, Chiguata, Cerro Colorado, Jacobo Hunter, Mariano Melgar, Miraflores, Mollebaya, Paucarpata, Quequeña, Sabandía, Socabaya, Tiabaya, Uchumayo and Yarabamba.

Arequipa Metropolitan Area (AMA)
Scope	Urban zone	District	District capital	Category
Metropolitan area	City	Arequipa	Arequipa	City
Metropolitan area	City	Alto Selva Alegre	Selva Alegre	City
Metropolitan area	City	Cayma	Cayma	Town
Metropolitan area	City	Cerro Colorado	La Libertad	Town
Metropolitan area	City	Jacobo Hunter	Jacobo Hunter	City
Metropolitan area	City	Mariano Melgar	Mariano Melgar	Town
Metropolitan area	City	Miraflores	Miraflores	Town
Metropolitan area	City	Paucarpata	Paucarpata	Town
Metropolitan area	City	Sachaca	Sachaca	Town
Metropolitan area	City	Sabandía	Sabandía	Town
Metropolitan area	City	Quequeña	Quequeña	Town
Metropolitan area	City	Socabaya	Socabaya	Town
Metropolitan area	City	Tiabaya	Tiabaya	City
Metropolitan area	City	Yanahuara	Yanahuara	Town
Metropolitan area	City	José Luis Bustamante y Rivero	Ciudad Satélite	City
Metropolitan area	Conurbated or semi-conurbated urban areas	Mollebaya	Mollebaya	Town
Metropolitan area	Conurbated or semi-conurbated urban areas	Characato	Characato	Town
Metropolitan area	Conurbated or semi-conurbated urban areas	Chiguata	Chiguata	Town
Metropolitan area	Conurbated or semi-conurbated urban areas	Uchumayo	Uchumayo	Town
Metropolitan area	Conurbated or semi-conurbated urban areas	Polobaya	Polobaya Grande	Town
Metropolitan area	Conurbated or semi-conurbated urban areas	Yarabamba	Yarabamba	Town
Metropolitan area	Conurbated or semi-conurbated urban areas	Yura	Yura	Town

== Geography ==
=== Location ===
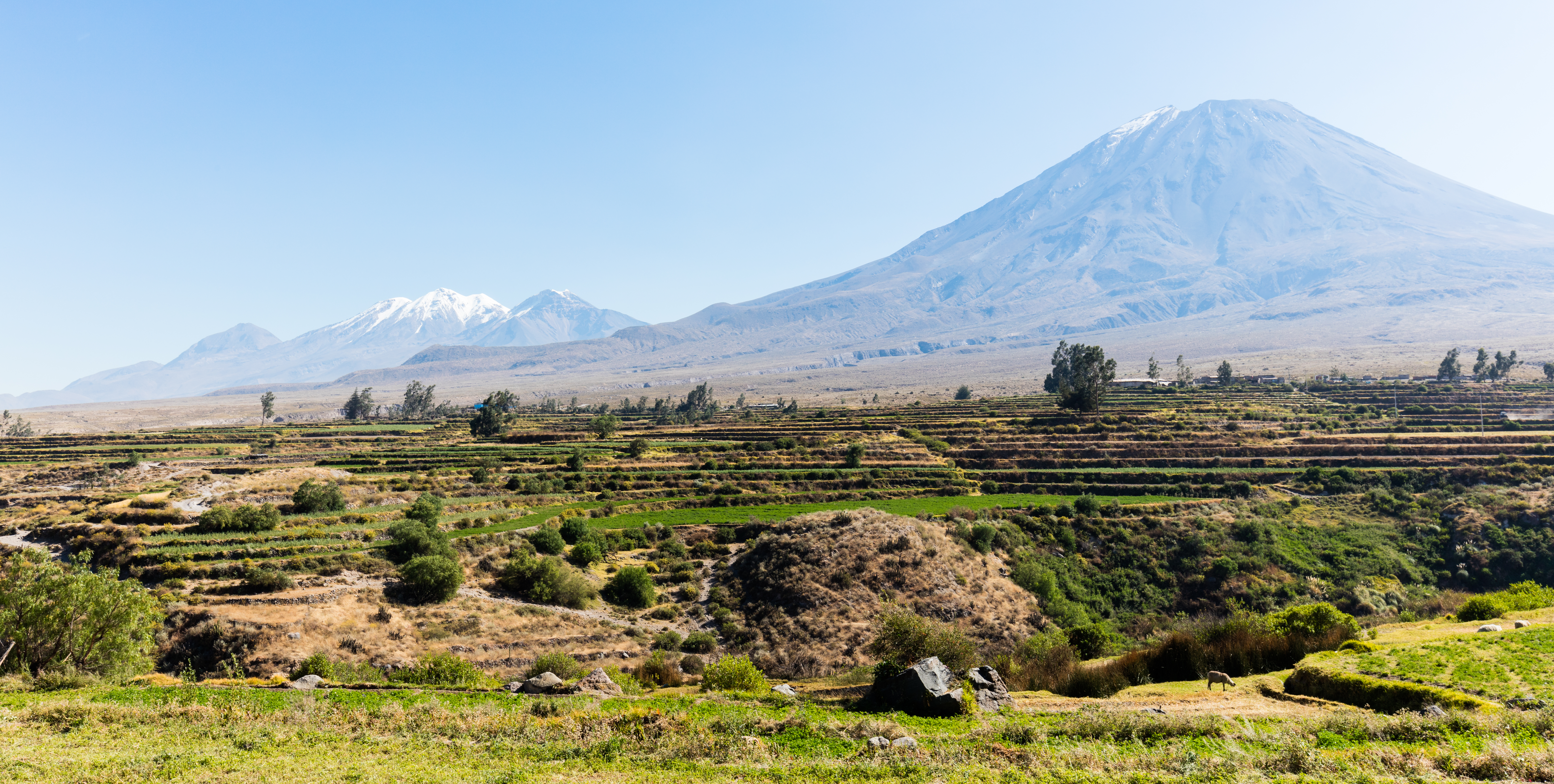
View of the Misti volcano, the city of Arequipa and the Chili River valley.

The city lies in the Quechua altitudinal region at an elevation of 2328 m above sea level. Its lowest sector, known as Huayco in the district of Uchumayo, is at 2041 m, while its highest point reaches 2810 m.

The Chili River crosses the center of the city from north to southwest, forming the Arequipa or Chili valley. Surrounded by mountains to the north and east and hills to the south and west, the valley functions as a geographical corridor connecting the desert with the highland puna. This setting makes Arequipa a meeting point between the coast and the highlands and a nexus for regional communication and development. From almost any point in the city, volcanic cones such as Misti, Chachani and Pichu Pichu can be seen. Volcanic lava layers dominate the surrounding Andean landscape.

=== Climate ===
Arequipa has a temperate arid climate (Köppen BWk), with an average annual temperature of approximately 14.5 °C and annual precipitation between 75 and 100 mm. Low atmospheric humidity produces arid conditions during winter, autumn and spring.

City and countryside, with the desert as their outer frame. Geographically speaking, Arequipa thus falls into the category of oasis: a people on an islet of greenery. Everything around it is arid: on one side the solitary, silent mountains; on the other, the rough, bare pampa.

— José Luis Bustamante y Rivero

Seasonally, the city has a climate distinguished by the absence of severe winters and hot summers. During the year, temperatures rarely exceed 25 °C. The wet season is limited to December through March and appears mainly as afternoon cloudiness and sporadic rainfall. In winter, especially June and July, temperatures can fall to an average of 6 °C.

Average relative humidity is 46%, varying from a minimum of 27% in autumn, winter and spring to a summer maximum of 70%, according to the Goyeneche Hospital weather station. Wind dynamics are influenced by local topography and by low-pressure frontal systems. Winds are more frequent at night and in the early morning, varying in direction and speed between 1.5 m/s and 2.5 m/s.

Global solar radiation recorded in Arequipa ranges from 850 to 950 W/m^{2}, placing it among the highest-radiation locations in South America and the highest in Peru. These high levels are linked to the city's proximity to the Atacama Desert and to environmental pollution. Constant sunshine and clear skies produce 18 annual days with rainfall over 1 mm and 3333 annual hours of solar exposure.

Climate data for Arequipa, Peru
Month	Jan	Feb	Mar	Apr	May	Jun	Jul	Aug	Sep	Oct	Nov	Dec	Year
Record high °C (°F)	29.5 (85.1)	29.7 (85.5)	26.6 (79.9)	26.4 (79.5)	32.0 (89.6)	26.2 (79.2)	28.0 (82.4)	26.8 (80.2)	27.0 (80.6)	26.1 (79.0)	27.8 (82.0)	27.2 (81.0)	32.0 (89.6)
Mean daily maximum °C (°F)	21.8 (71.2)	21.4 (70.5)	24.2 (75.6)	24.7 (76.5)	22.3 (72.1)	21.7 (71.1)	21.7 (71.1)	22.2 (72.0)	22.7 (72.9)	22.8 (73.0)	22.7 (72.9)	22.5 (72.5)	22.6 (72.6)
Daily mean °C (°F)	15.3 (59.5)	15.1 (59.2)	15.1 (59.2)	14.7 (58.5)	14.1 (57.4)	13.6 (56.5)	13.2 (55.8)	13.6 (56.5)	14.7 (58.5)	14.7 (58.5)	14.6 (58.3)	15.2 (59.4)	14.5 (58.1)
Mean daily minimum °C (°F)	8.5 (47.3)	8.7 (47.7)	8.3 (46.9)	7.1 (44.8)	6.2 (43.2)	5.4 (41.7)	5.2 (41.4)	5.4 (41.7)	6.2 (43.2)	6.4 (43.5)	6.6 (43.9)	7.6 (45.7)	6.8 (44.2)
Record low °C (°F)	0.9 (33.6)	0.0 (32.0)	0.0 (32.0)	−2.0 (28.4)	0.0 (32.0)	−1.1 (30.0)	−3.7 (25.3)	−0.2 (31.6)	0.0 (32.0)	0.1 (32.2)	0.0 (32.0)	2.0 (35.6)	−3.7 (25.3)
Average rainfall mm (inches)	28 (1.1)	35.6 (1.40)	21.3 (0.84)	0.7 (0.03)	0.2 (0.01)	0 (0)	0 (0)	1.8 (0.07)	1.4 (0.06)	0.2 (0.01)	1.1 (0.04)	4.3 (0.17)	94.6 (3.73)
Average relative humidity (%)	52	59	58	48	41	45	44	43	42	39	39	43	46
Mean monthly sunshine hours	223.2	189.3	244.9	294.0	288.3	291.0	291.4	310.0	297.0	303.8	309.0	291.4	3,333.3
Mean daily sunshine hours	7.2	6.7	7.9	9.8	9.3	9.7	9.4	10.0	9.9	9.8	10.3	9.4	9.1
Source 1: World Meteorological Organization
Source 2: Deutscher Wetterdienst (humidity and sunshine), Meteo Climat (extremes, 1892-present), and climate-data.org

== Demographics ==
=== Demographic evolution ===
Census population
Year	Pop.	±% p.a.
1796	37,241	—
1804	37,148	−0.03%
1812	34,478	−0.93%
1876	30,932	−0.17%
1917	44,209	+0.87%
1940	80,947	+2.66%
1961	158,685	+3.26%
1972	309,094	+6.25%
1981	446,942	+4.18%
1993	619,156	+2.75%
2007	806,782	+1.91%
2017	1,008,290	+2.25%
2025 (est.)	1,195,700	+2.15%
Source: 1804 population census (Gil de Toboada); Peruvian Viceroyalty in 1812; (Note: The source considered the population of the "Cercado" district, which may be broader than the city proper but serves as a reference.) General Census of inhabitants of Peru (1876); (Note: The source stated that the city of Arequipa was composed of the districts of Arequipa, Miraflores and Palomar.) 1917 census of the city of Arequipa; Internal migrations in Peru, INEI; 2017 National Census; INEI census projections, 2024

One of the earliest documented descriptions of the city was made by Ventura y Travada in the mid-18th century:

The number of people in this city is 30,000 of all sexes, statuses and ages. The Indians are scarcely 4,000, and for their doctrine a single parish in the city, Santa Marta, is enough; it includes all the foreign and native Indians who live dispersed in the city and, being only one parish, is not very numerous, because excluding some blacks, mulattoes and others they barely reach 6,000. All the rest are Spaniards, many of known nobility, whose blood they honorably seek not to degenerate.

— Travada Córdova y Ventura

The first known official population census in the city dates to 1796, when 37,241 inhabitants were recorded in the central area known as the Cercado. The population was divided into 22,207 Spaniards, 5,929 Indians, 4,908 mestizos, 2,487 castas and 1,710 enslaved people.

In 1804, at the conclusion of Apuntes para la Historia de Arequipa, Zamácola y Jáuregui suggested, with some uncertainty, that the city and its eight nearby towns contained between 50,000 and 60,000 inhabitants. He mentioned 40,000 Spaniards and stated that the rest of the population consisted of Indians, blacks, zambos, mulattoes and cuarterones. These figures have been cited as evidence of the city's Hispanization and of its implications for emancipation and the formation of the republic.

In the mid-20th century, the city experienced rapid demographic growth, rising from 85,000 inhabitants in 1940 to 158,000 in 1961. Several factors contributed to the increase, including the establishment of the first industries under the import-substitution model promoted by the Second World War, and changes in agricultural production. During the second half of the 20th century, rapid population growth was also linked to works carried out in Arequipa in the 1940s. Annual growth, 1.1% between 1876 and 1917, tripled to 3.3% between 1940 and 1960.

The pattern changed after two major events: the 1958 earthquake and drought in the Peruvian altiplano, both of which accelerated migration and urbanization. Population growth intensified after urban reordering following the earthquakes, doubling Arequipa's population in only a decade. The 158,000 inhabitants recorded in 1961 became 309,000 in 1972 and almost 500,000 in 1983. This growth led to expansion into rural areas, producing an economic cycle in which subsistence agriculture remained active.

Arequipa's demographic evolution remained dynamic in the late 20th and early 21st centuries. In 1993 the city had 619,156 inhabitants, an increase of 38.5% over previous figures. In 2007 the number rose to 806,782, an increase of 30.3%. By 2017, the population was estimated at 1,008,290, representing an additional increase of 25.0%.

According to the 2017 Peruvian census, the province of Arequipa concentrated 78% of the region's total population, and the city of Arequipa, the departmental capital, concentrated 70% of the total population and 90% of the urban population. (Note: The source states that the department of Arequipa is in southwestern Peru and has 1,140,810 inhabitants distributed in eight provinces and 109 districts over 63,345.39 km^{2}. It also notes that 82% of the population lives in settlements of more than 2,000 inhabitants, considered urban, and that 84% lives in the highlands. The province of Arequipa concentrates 75.5% of the region's population, and the city of Arequipa, the departmental capital, concentrates 70% of the total and 90% of the urban population.) The city of Arequipa has a projected 2025 population of 1,195,700, an annual growth rate of 2.15% for 2017-2025.

=== District population ===
The following table presents the estimated 2025 population of the districts that make up the metropolitan and conurbated zones of Arequipa. The breakdown is based on official sources and is intended to provide a quantitative view of the city's population dynamics.

Population in the districts of Metropolitan Arequipa
Scope	Urban zone	District	Estimated population (2025)
Metropolitan zone	City	Arequipa	54,262
Metropolitan zone	City	Alto Selva Alegre	96,315
Metropolitan zone	City	Cayma	115,881
Metropolitan zone	City	Cerro Colorado	259,214
Metropolitan zone	City	Jacobo Hunter	55,382
Metropolitan zone	City	José Luis Bustamante y Rivero	85,243
Metropolitan zone	City	Mariano Melgar	70,154
Metropolitan zone	City	Miraflores	69,725
Metropolitan zone	City	Paucarpata	139,513
Metropolitan zone	City	Sabandía	5,020
Metropolitan zone	City	Sachaca	32,152
Metropolitan zone	City	Socabaya	92,001
Metropolitan zone	City	Tiabaya	18,026
Metropolitan zone	City	Yanahuara	27,815
Metropolitan zone	Conurbated zone	Characato	19,172
Metropolitan zone	Conurbated zone	Chiguata	3,382
Metropolitan zone	Conurbated zone	Mollebaya	8,826
Metropolitan zone	Conurbated zone	Polobaya	672
Metropolitan zone	Conurbated zone	Quequeña	8,711
Metropolitan zone	Conurbated zone	Uchumayo	19,147
Metropolitan zone	Conurbated zone	Yarabamba	1,797
Metropolitan zone	Conurbated zone	Yura	49,354

== Architecture and urbanism ==
=== Historical urban evolution of Arequipa ===
==== Foundational grid ====
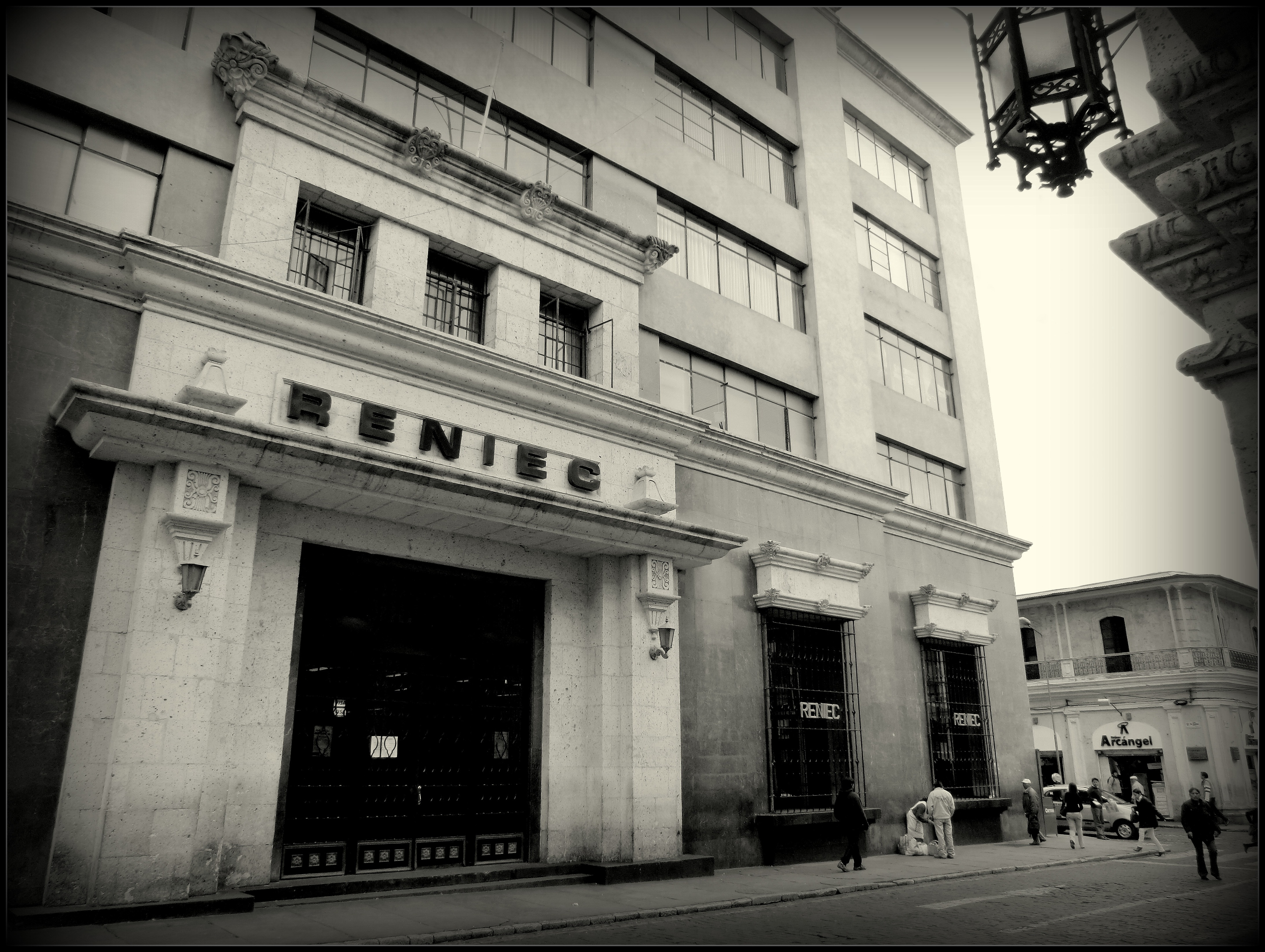
Building constructed in the 1940s under the neo-colonial evocation of the Arequipan school, at General Morán and San Juan de Dios streets in the Historic Centre. It originally housed Banco Internacional and now serves as the main office of RENIEC.

On 15 August 1540, a plan of 49 blocks or islands was laid out. (Note: The source notes that the streets were set out by cord, perpendicular to one another, forming 56 islands or blocks, an authentic checkerboard preserved with few variations.) The sides of each block measured 400 Castilian feet (111.40 meters), separated by streets 37 Castilian feet (10.30 meters) wide. The foundational grid is noted for the precision of its blocks. (Note: The source adds that the streets were thirty feet wide and each block 250 feet long. The primitive plan was later altered when convents and monasteries requiring two blocks were founded, at which point small squares appeared. After lots were distributed, residents did not build immediately, and the cabildo repeatedly ordered them to build houses.)

Pedro Dávalos y Lissón, in La Primera Centuria, reproduced a description offered by Paz Soldán in 1855:

This city was founded by order of Francisco Pizarro and by solemn proclamation on 15 August 1540. Its first site was behind Cayma, but it was later moved to its present location because it offered more space and convenience. In laying it out, care was taken that its streets should cross at right angles, nearly north-south and east-west, and that each block should be 150 varas long and about twelve wide. To preserve health, convenience and cleanliness, canals were cut down the middle of the streets, both longitudinal and transverse, with well-channelled beds. There are eight streets running east-west, the main ones, and eight others; their sidewalks are all paved with a kind of white volcanic stone called sillar, and the remaining surface with pebbles.

— La primera centuria: causas geográficas, políticas y económicas que han detenido el progreso moral y material del Perú en el primer siglo de su vida independiente. Tomo II

The layout suggests that the then "Villa Hermosa de Arequipa" aspired to become a regional capital. The city was built as a connection point between Cusco, Charcas and the ocean. During the period of silver exploitation at Potosí, Arequipa became a logistical center. The urban settlement in the present-day San Lázaro quarter, where the city's first hermitage was built, covered 850 by 875 meters. The foundational square, three blocks from the river and off-center within the grid, followed Hispanic urban patterns as the city's focal point. Blocks were subdivided into four or eight lots and assigned to new residents according to their importance. Over time, some religious institutions occupied entire blocks, such as the Convent of Santa Catalina and the Monastery of San Francisco.

==== Republican period ====
During the republican period, Arequipa experienced urban growth similar to that of the colonial period. Expansion took place mainly at the expense of the countryside, a phenomenon that has intensified in recent decades. The city also spread east of the present Historic Centre of Arequipa, where new avenues such as Parra Boulevard and Siglo XX Avenue were laid out. The tree-lined neighborhood of El Vallecito was created in this phase, with its first chalets appearing in the 1940s. The municipality of 1940 also addressed social issues by opening a maternal nursery, creating an office to control street begging and building a workers' neighborhood. The damage suffered by Barrio Obrero No. 1 that year revealed the absence of adequate studies in 1940.

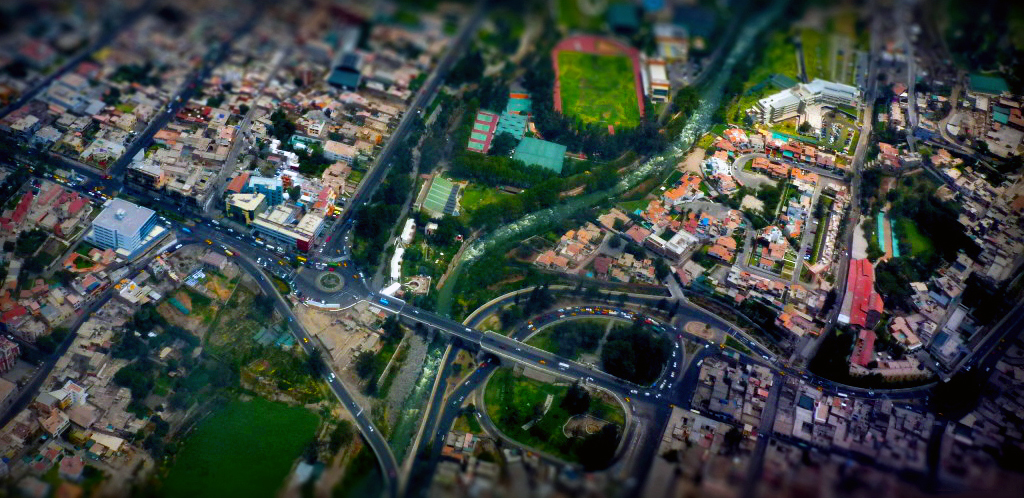
Intersection of La Marina, Ejército, Puente Bolognesi and Francisco Bolognesi avenues in the central area of the city.

Architecturally, the city underwent significant changes. The market originally located in the Plaza de Armas was moved first to Duhamel Park and later to its current site in the convent of the Order of the Agonizing Fathers of San Camilo. Between 1905 and 1910, the Goyeneche Hospital was built, and bridges such as the Puente Real, now known as Puente Grau, were erected to connect the center with Yanahuara. In the 1940s, the first urban expansion and equipment project was presented, envisioning radial growth in roads and a concentric plan for land use. The Cuarto Centenario and Selva Alegre neighborhoods were developed. Urban facilities were strengthened with the construction of the Municipal Theatre, the Hotel de Turistas, the Municipal Library, Teatro Ateneo, Colegio Independencia Americana and the campus of the National University of San Agustín.

By the late 1950s, two factors altered urban growth trends: the 1958 and 1960 earthquakes and drought in the altiplano, which accelerated peripheral growth. During this period, the displacement of resident population sectors intensified, as did that of industry located in Barrio del Solar and Barrio Obrero after the creation of the industrial park. This shift led to the "tertiarization" of the city center, orienting it mainly toward informal commercial activities. An example is the relocation of educational institutions such as the National University of San Agustín in 1962, and of residential sectors toward the periphery, consolidating the center as a dynamic commercial district.

=== Green spaces and environment ===
In the central district and adjoining areas, numerous parks and squares together cover 26 hectares of green areas. They are complemented by 22 hectares of countryside within the monumental zone. Representative spaces include:

- Plaza de Armas
- Plaza San Francisco
- Grau Children's Park
- Parque Biela
- Miguel Grau Oval
- Malecón Bolognesi
- Parque 28 de Febrero
- Parque La Recoleta
- Parque Recoleta 1
- Parque Recoleta 2
- Juan Manuel Polar Oval
- Parque El Poeta
- Parque Benigno Ballón Farfán
- Parque Ciudad de Salta
- Parque Dante Alighieri
- Parque Martinetty
- Parque Melgar
- Plazoleta San Camilo
- Parque Duhamel
- Plaza 15 de Agosto
- Plaza España
- Plaza Santa Teresa
- Plaza Independencia
- Parque San Lázaro
- Parque Selva Alegre
- Bosque Selva Alegre
- Plaza San Antonio
- Plaza Romaña
- Municipal nursery
- Selva Alegre Children's Park

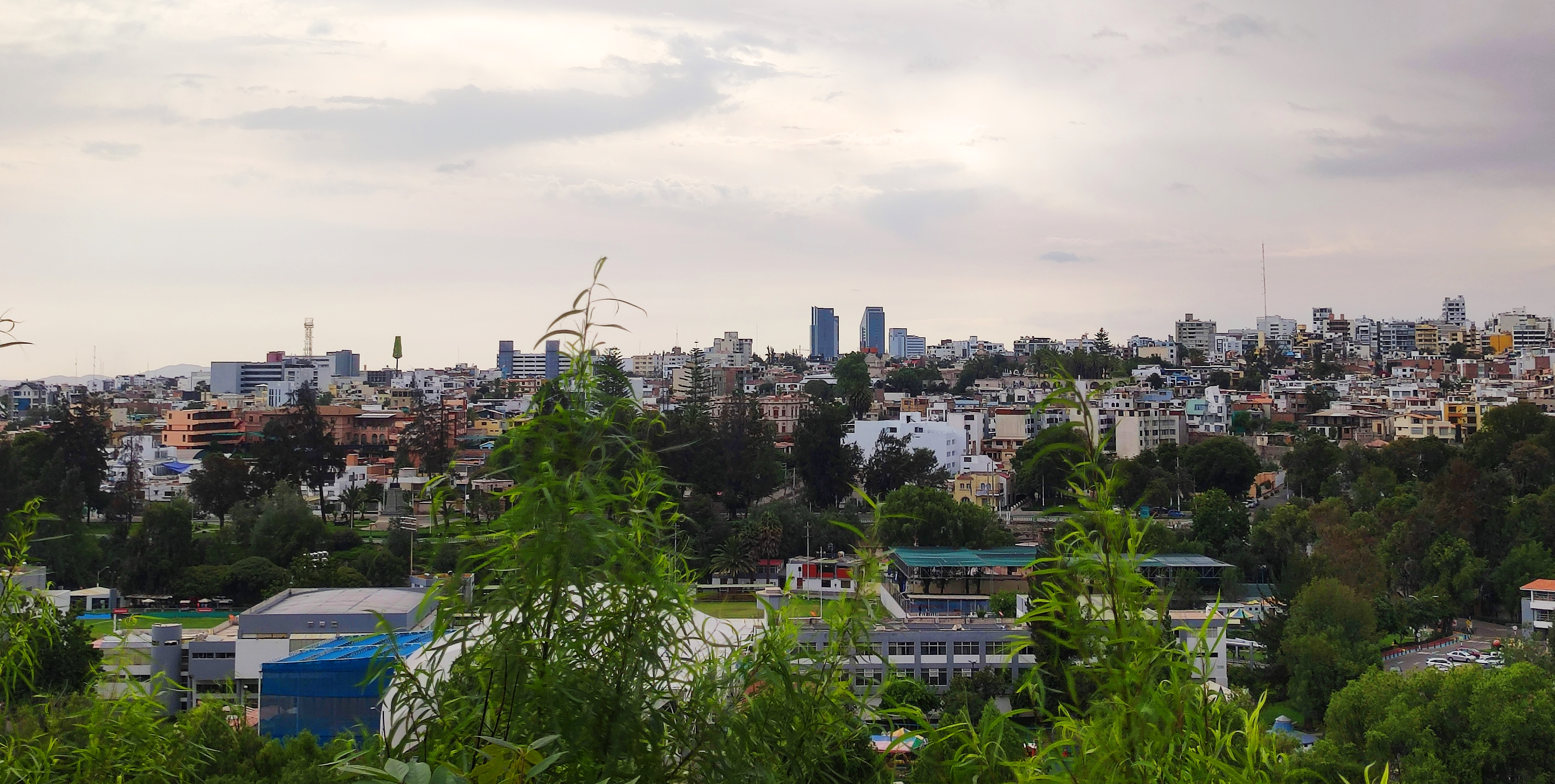
Districts of Cayma and Yanahuara seen from Selva Alegre Park.

Outside the monumental area, natural spaces include:

- Alto Selva Alegre Ecological Park, located in an urban area east of the city. The park and nearby areas cover 1008 hectares, of which 460 hectares belong exclusively to the ecological park.
- Chilina Valley countryside, part of the Selva Alegre natural park, occupying 151 hectares.
- Chilpinilla Metropolitan Park, covering 14 hectares.
- Military College Forest Park, also covering 14 hectares.

== Economy ==
Economic indicators - City of Arequipa
GDP 2015 (US$ bn)	GDP per capita 2015 (US$)	Unemployment 2012 (%)	Investment banks
9,445	18,610	5.9	1
Sources: América Economía, Especial Ciudades; McKinsey & Company. US$ bn: billions of United States dollars.

Arequipa has a diversified economy in which industry, agriculture, commerce and construction play central roles. Fertile valleys and high-Andean areas also make agriculture and livestock relevant, and irrigation systems have been built to improve productivity. In recent times, mining has modernized, moving from primarily artisanal or small enterprises toward large-scale mining, exemplified by companies such as Cerro Verde, founded in 1993 in the city of Arequipa.

Arequipa is Peru's second most industrialized and economically active city. In 2024 the Department of Arequipa reached a nominal GDP of S/31.458 billion and GDP per capita of S/19,593, making it the country's second-largest regional economy. Because the capital city concentrates much of the department's economic activity, the departmental figure provides broad macroeconomic context for the city. A 2015 study estimated the city's own GDP at US$9.445 billion. Industrial activity includes manufactured goods, textile production from wool of camelids, and production and sale of copper and molybdenum concentrates. The city maintains commercial ties with Chile, Bolivia and Brazil and is connected by the Southern Railway to the port of Matarani and the cities of Cusco and Puno.

=== Industry ===
The city's industrial sector is diversified and has a national presence. This diversification was largely achieved through the creation of the Parque Industrial during the first government of Fernando Belaúnde Terry. After two earthquakes in 1958 and 1960, the law creating the "Rehabilitation and Development Board of Arequipa" led to the construction of the industrial park, initially housing two or three factories, including the Yura cement factory.

Largest Peruvian companies headquartered in Arequipa 2021 ranking by 2019 revenue
Arequipa rank	Corporation	Peru rank	Revenue (US$ millions)
1	Cerro Verde	10	2,896
2	Holding Alimentario del Perú (Grupo Gloria)	16	1,776
3	Leche Gloria	25	1,042
4	Aceros Arequipa	48	936
7	Minera Ares	83	492
6	Caja Arequipa	131	316
5	Yura	156	298
8	SEAL	226	167
9	Michell	385	105
11	Incatops	469	56
10	EGASA	477	51
Net revenues of each firm exceed US$50 million.
Source: Ranking de las 500 mayores empresas de Perú, AméricaEconomía.

Arequipa's industrial activity includes manufacturing, textiles made from the wool of American camelids, and the production and sale of copper and molybdenum concentrates. The city maintains commercial links with Chile, Bolivia and Brazil, as well as with the cities connected through the southern and southeastern railway and the port of Matarani.

The industrial sector consists of several industrial parks, including the Arequipa Industrial Park for large and medium-sized firms, and APIMA Industrial Park for small businesses, as well as Río Seco Industrial Park and industrial zones on Alfonso Ugarte Avenue, the Variante de Uchumayo and the northern cone. Developing sectors such as Umapalca and Ladrilleras on the road to Yarabamba occupy 286 hectares designated for industry.

Arequipa Industrial Park has changed its industrial branches over time, with greater dynamism in consumer industries (food and beverages), construction (PVC, cement and steel) and exports (textile companies). The park also includes chemical, plastics, non-metallic minerals, paper and printing industries. It houses more than 150 companies, including Alicorp S.A.A., Alimentos Procesados S.A., Laive, La Ibérica, Manuel Muñoz-Nájar, Papelera Panamericana S.A., Consorcio Industrial Arequipa S.A., Omniagro, Backus & Johnston and Corporación Aceros Arequipa. A textile industry in cotton, alpaca fiber and wool has also developed in Arequipa, represented by factories such as Francky y Ricky, Michell & Cía. and IncaTops, many of which operate in the industrial park.

=== Construction ===
According to the Urban Buildings Study prepared by the Construction and Development Institute of the Peruvian Chamber of Construction, Arequipa's construction sector is the second most dynamic in the country after Lima. In 2011, construction activity covered 611,961 square meters, of which 65% was devoted to housing, 10% to offices and 4% to commercial premises. In the housing supply, apartments represented 70%, while houses accounted for 30%.

=== Labor market ===
Since the 20th century, Arequipa has been an economic center in Peru, especially in industries tied to the primary sector, such as textiles and agroindustry. The city became an intermediary market in the southern Andean region, linking the coast with the highlands.

According to the Specialized Household Survey on Employment Levels, Arequipa has the largest "population economically fit to work" in Peru's interior, with 625,547 people, and the largest economically active population (PEA), with 376,764 people. Its labor participation rate is above the national average and average monthly income is 928 nuevos soles. The main areas of labor activity are manufacturing (12.9%), commerce (23%) and non-personal services (36.6%).

=== Tourism ===
Tourism is an economic driver for Arequipa, and the city has become the third most visited destination in Peru after Cusco and Lima. In 2022, Arequipa received 1,589,874 visitors, of whom 1,264,938 were domestic and 324,936 foreign.

Fairs, exhibitions and congresses

Arequipa has become a national center for exhibitions and events, with the Arequipa Convention Bureau promoting fairs and exhibitions in the city. In 2011, around 1,200 events were recorded.

Arequipa has the Corso de la Amistad, a parade in which several district delegations of the region participate. It also has the Decentralized Corso for delegations from outside the region.

== Arequipan speech and idiosyncrasy ==
=== Arequipan Spanish ===
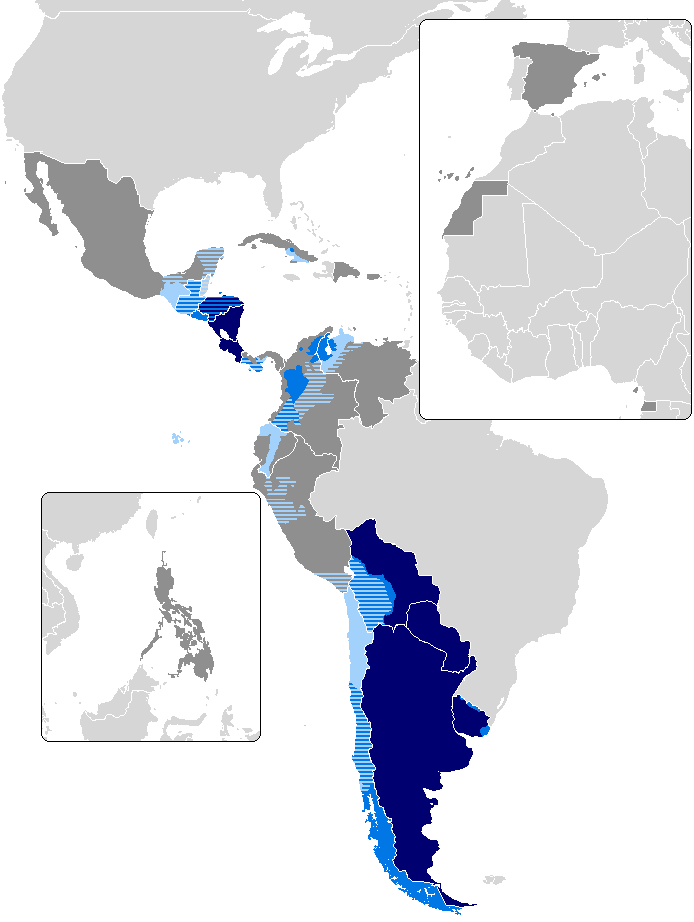
Generalized oral and written voseo Generalized oral voseo Voseo coexisting with tuteo or stigmatized regional voseo Spanish-speaking countries without voseo

The Spanish spoken in Arequipa is a reference point for Peruvian voseo, according to several sources. In Arequipa, both rural and urban areas use vos instead of tú, in contrast with northern Peru, where voseo is considered archaic and restricted mainly to rural areas.

The use of vos in Arequipa is accompanied by voseante verb endings of Chilean origin. The paradigm used is linked to monophthongal type-II voseo, and third-person conjugations appear in the second conjugation.

About fifty years ago, voseo verb forms in Arequipa included has, estáis, vos, sois and sometimes sos, tomás, as well as forms in -és even in the first conjugation, such as enojés or chapés. These data, however, come mainly from literary texts and may reflect hyperdialectalization.

Verbal voseo is expressed mainly in the present indicative and imperative moods. Compared with nearby countries such as Argentina, Chile and Bolivia, where verbal voseo is used in all applicable tenses and moods, its use in Arequipa is more limited. Verbal voseo in Arequipa is practically restricted to the present tense and subjunctive mood, suggesting that it may be disappearing.

In addition to verbal voseo, Arequipa uses suffixes and affixes of Quechua origin in forming adjectives and diminutives. The suffix -uso, for example, is productive in the Americas and forms adjectives with negatively valued properties, such as caroso, derived from a Quechua base referring to someone with skin faded by ccara. The Quechua affix -sh is also used in diminutives and hypocoristics in some areas, such as Cushto, Gonsha and Tusha.

Verb conjugations in Arequipan Spanish
Distribution of Arequipan verbal voseo forms
Indicative		Subjunctive	Imperative
Present	Preterite	Present	Present
Amás	Amaste(s)	Amarás	Amá
Temís	Temiste(s)	Temerís	Temé
Partís	Partiste(s)	Partirís	Partí

A particular feature is stress shift from a penultimate to final position when the clitic lo is added to a verb stem.

Stress of the pronoun lo
Stress shift from penultimate to final position
Standard pronunciation	Arequipan pronunciation
Pásamelo	Pasameló
Indícalo	Indicaló
Míralo	Miraló
Préstamelo	Prestameló

=== Loncco dialect ===
Arequipa has a distinctive dialect known as the "Loncco dialect" or "Loncco speech". The variety forms part of the cultural and linguistic heritage of Arequipa Province and represents the identity of the lonccos, farmers living around the city. Loncco poetry, a literary genre using this dialect, has been cultivated both by poets such as José Luis Bustamante y Rivero, Alberto Hidalgo, Alberto Guillén, Percy Gibson and Guillermo Mercado, and by native loncco poets such as Artemio Ramírez Bejarano, Isidro Zárate Santillana, Félix García Salas and Sebastián Oscco Dongo.

Although this linguistic variety is sometimes called "Arequipan loncco poetry", it is rooted in the region's agrarian and popular communities and is often created by self-taught authors. Carpio Muñoz stresses that these voices and expressions are integral to the speech of both farmers and inhabitants of Arequipa. In other regions, such as Cusco and Puno, speakers are bilingual and communicate in Spanish and, when necessary, Quechua. In Arequipa, however, Spanish predominates in everyday and family life, though words of Quechua and Aymara origin are occasionally incorporated into local speech.

Today, the lonccos represent an element of Arequipan cultural identity from earlier times. Loncco speech survives among peasants and residents of the oldest and most traditional districts, enriching the local poetic repertoire and the loncco sentiments valued by the Arequipan community.

El «camayo», yo quisiera ser,
de la chacra de tu corazón,

«pa'humariarte» ¡oh, bella mujer!
y después «taparte» el «boquerón».

¿«Vo'sois» el que me «querís» pretender?
«botále» un «güeso» a la calle –Simón–,
y «decile» que se vaya a entretener,
porque «tuavía» tiene olor a «requesón».

¡Ay, «cchichipa» te tengo que «merendar»!,
aunque me cueste pisar espinas,
sobre ellas «ti'hi» de «ccospiar».

«Mirálo» el «pacpaco» me quiere enamorar,
teniendo las rodillas «frontinas»,
y «tuito», el culo pa'remendar.

— From El Pretendiente by Artemio Ramírez Bejarano

=== Idiosyncrasy ===
Arequipa has a marked regional identity within Peru. In contrast with cities perceived as more cosmopolitan or more strongly Indigenous in cultural profile, Arequipa has sometimes been described as a "Spanish island". This perception has contributed to sharper regional profiles than in other parts of Peru. Culturally and geographically, it has been called both a cultural and natural oasis. Ventura Travada reaffirmed this perception:

The number of people in this city is barely 30,000 [...] the blacks, mulattoes and others barely reach 6,000; all the rest are Spaniards, many of known nobility, because this city is among those in the kingdom that stand out for Spanish people whose blood they seek not to degenerate, celebrating many marriages with Spaniards called huampos. These Spaniards, as soon as they arrive in this kingdom, apply themselves to mercantile commerce, because it is generally one of the most honorable occupations.

— Travada Córdova y Ventura

Arequipan regionalism differs from other Peruvian regionalisms. While places such as Cusco proudly carry the legacy of having been capital of the Inca Empire, Arequipan regionalism is tied to the struggle against centralism:

In contrast to other Peruvian regionalisms, especially that of Cusco with its singular legacy of having been capital of the Inca Empire, Arequipan regional sentiment was connected to the struggle against the centralist policy of creating a modern state, a credible alternative to Lima centralism. Arequipan regionalism has managed to avoid dismissal as mere provincialism. It critiques decentralist policy by drawing on a reserve of local, place-specific images as symbolic capital to validate the material success of regional ruling classes.

— Thomas Love, Redefining Identity, Maintaining Control in Southwestern Peru

Several elements have shaped Arequipan culture. One of its distinctive marks is regionalism, evident in multiple insurrections and revolutions. This trait led to the nickname "City-Caudillo". Another emblem is Jorge Basadre's phrase, "Arequipa is the pistol aimed at Lima's heart", reflecting the historic antagonism between the two cities.

== Monuments and places of interest ==
=== Historic center ===
Historic Centre of Arequipa
UNESCO World Heritage Site
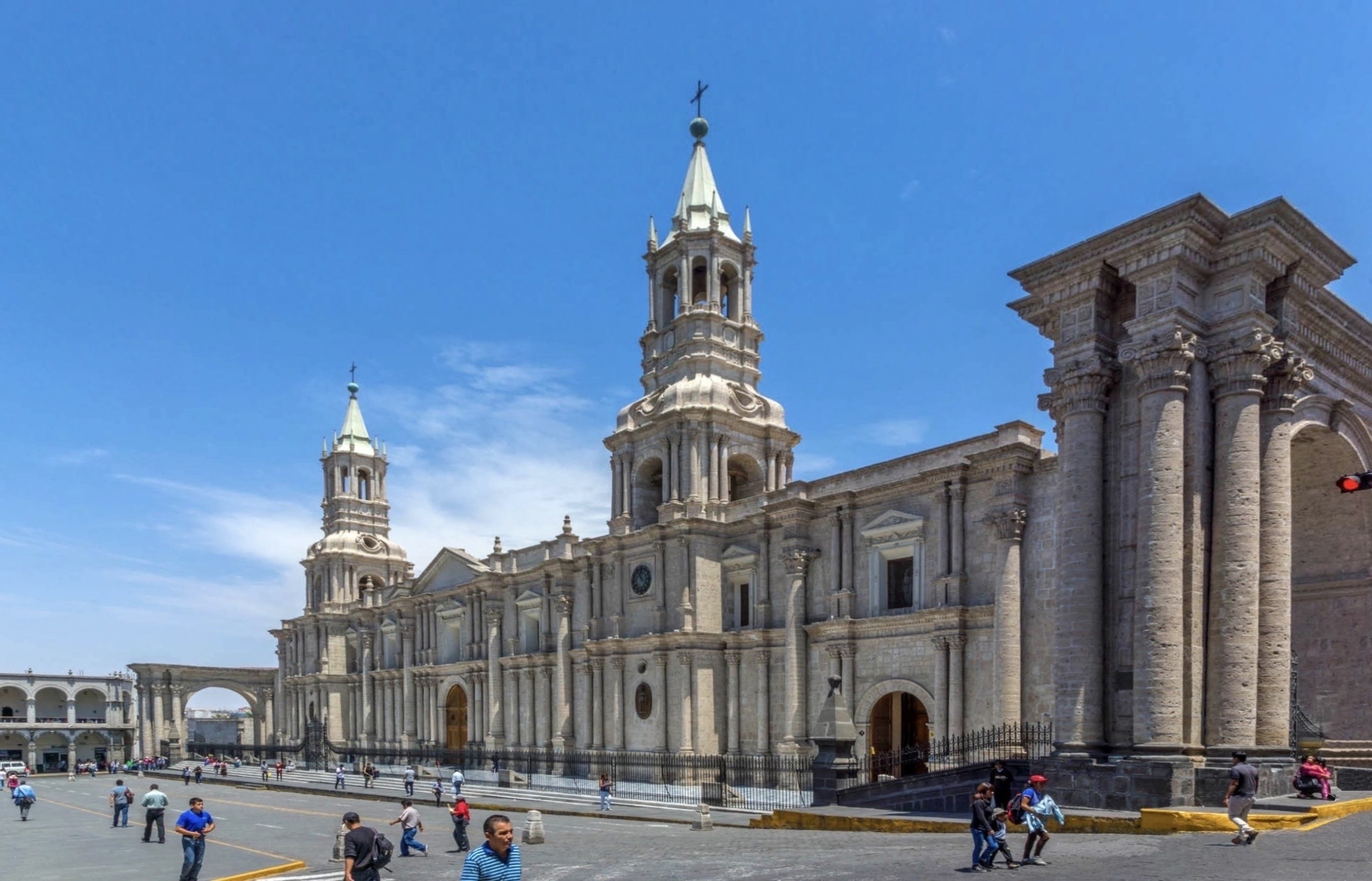
- Basilica Cathedral of Arequipa
- Interactive map of Historic Centre of Arequipa
- Location: Arequipa, Peru
- Criteria: Cultural: i, iv
- Reference: 1016
- Inscription: 2000 (24th Session)

The historic center of Arequipa, covering about 332 hectares, contains 5,817 properties, of which 500 are considered heritage buildings. Most of these buildings, erected in the 19th century, stand on the foundations of colonial structures destroyed by the 1868 earthquake. These casonas, predominantly built in sillar, are distinguished by semicircular arches and vaulted roofs. Sillar, a white and occasionally pink volcanic stone, has played a fundamental role in Arequipa's architecture from pre-Inca cultures to the present; ancient inhabitants used it to create petroglyphs and pictograms. In colonial and republican buildings, sillar walls are 1 to 1.5 meters thick in rooms and more than 2 meters thick in churches. Lime mortar gives the walls uniformity, reinforced by brick or sillar vaults, the latter choice explained by the scarcity of wood.

Civil buildings include Casa Moral, Casa Tristán del Pozo, Casa de Irriberry, Casa del Pastor, Palacio de Goyeneche and the Founder's Mansion. In religious architecture, the Monastery of Santa Catalina is considered one of Peru's most important religious monuments. Also included are the Church of La Compañía and its cloisters, founded by the Jesuits in the 17th century, the colonial San Francisco complex, La Recoleta Franciscan Convent, and the church and convent of La Merced, dating from the 16th and 17th centuries. Military architecture includes the former Fundo El Fierro penitentiary and the 20th-century jail.

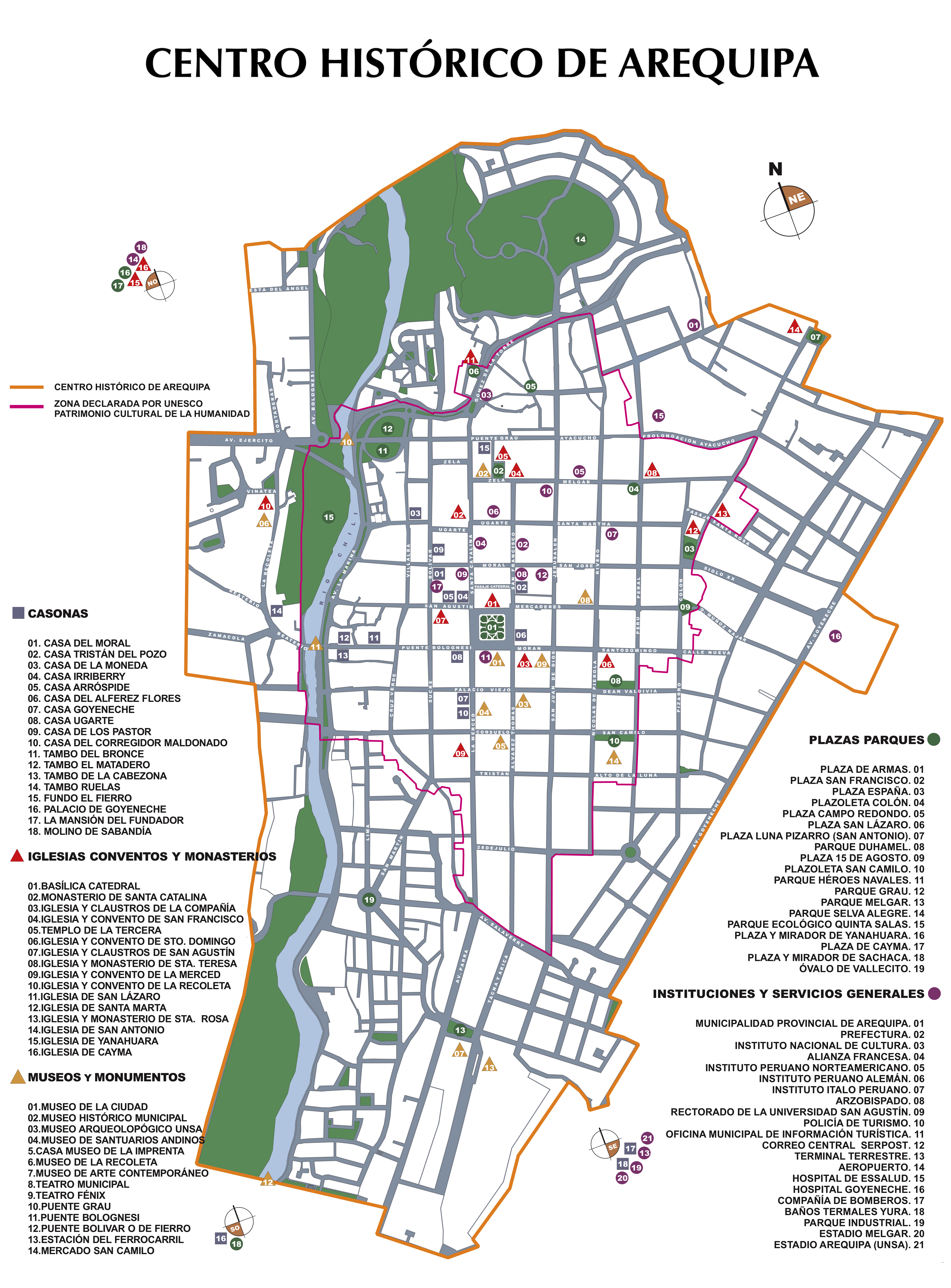
Historic Centre of Arequipa World Heritage zone

The architecture of the historic center is noted for its predominant use of sillar, first widely adopted in the final third of the 16th century as a seismic-resistant structural solution. Initially, this white or pink volcanic stone was not fully exploited, except for the façades of the main church and some houses. The original city was built mainly with adobe, lime and stone, roofs of sticks and straw, or mud roofing. Such houses continued to be built until the 19th century and were common in the 18th; some survive in the old San Lázaro quarter. Brick and tile later appeared, and houses with tile roofs are found in the Monastery of Santa Catalina. The 1582 earthquake, however, marked a turning point in Arequipan architecture by promoting sillar as the preferred structural solution.

Arequipa's architecture has been shaped by several earthquakes and is divided into periods: foundational and village architecture (1540-1582), Baroque (1582-1784), Rococo and Neoclassical revisions (1784-1868), modernizing empiricism and neo-colonial evocations (1868-1960), and contemporary architecture.

==== Religious monuments ====
The religious heritage of the historic center is extensive and important, comprising 14 churches or temples, four chapels, five convents and three monasteries. Notable monuments include:

- Cathedral of Arequipa: this neoclassical building is considered one of the most important of its kind in Peru. Its reconstruction, directed by architect Lucas Poblete, began in 1844 and was completed three years later. The cathedral interior has three naves, with the right nave facing one of its side façades opening to the main square. The main façade is divided by Corinthian columns.
- Church of La Compañía: an exponent of the Arequipan school, it is considered one of the creations of Peruvian Baroque and the starting point of that school. Its façade bears the date 1698, showing that regional art had reached a high level of development by the beginning of the 18th century. Inside is a Baroque altar.
- Monastery of Santa Catalina de Siena

==== Civil and secular monuments ====
Arequipa's non-religious architecture includes public, military and domestic buildings. Ten civic-public buildings include theatres such as Fénix and the Municipal Theatre, hospitals such as Goyeneche and the Hospital de Sacerdotes de San Pedro, bridges such as Bolognesi and Grau, the Chávez de la Rosa Institute, the railway station, San Camilo Market and the Molino de Santa Catalina. In the military sphere, although the city did not have walls like Lima, monuments such as the 20th-century jail and the Fundo El Fierro women's prison survive.

The most numerous expression of civil heritage is the 246 domestic casonas declared monuments. These buildings are characterized by robust walls, built like boxes, with arches and vaults similar to those of churches and monasteries, giving them solidity and monumentality. Among the most emblematic and visited examples of the 17th and 18th centuries are:

- Casa del Moral
- Goyeneche Palace
- Casa Tristán del Pozo
- Casa de la Moneda
- Casona Ugarte
- Casa Irribery
- Casa Arróspide
- Casa del Alférez Flores
- Casona del Corregidor Maldonado
- Casa del Corregidor Abril y Maldonado
- Casona Goyeneche
- Casa de los Pastor
- Tambo del Bronce
- Tambo de la Cabezona
- Tambo de Rúelas

=== Peripheral neighborhoods ===
- Monumental Zone of Yanahuara: 2 km from Arequipa's Plaza de Armas. It is the capital of Yanahuara district and is known for churches and alleys built in an Andalusian style. Its historic center, the Monumental Zone of Yanahuara, was designated Cultural Heritage of the Nation in 1972.
- Villa de Cayma: 3 km from the center, known as the "balcony of Arequipa" because of its elevated position. Its square contains a church built in 1730, considered an example of colonial religious art. Next to the church is the Casa Cural, where the historic dining room used by Simón Bolívar is preserved.
- Sabandía: 3 km from the city, a traditional town preserving colonial and republican houses. Its main attraction is the Sabandía Mill, built in 1621. Built in sillar, it is an example of local architecture and historically served to grind wheat, maize and other cereals.
- Sachaca: the district contains the Goyeneche Palace, an Arequipan architectural mansion with a viewpoint over the countryside. The ensemble includes a local church completed in 1807.
- The Founder's Mansion: located 12 km from the city on the edge of the Socabaya River. It belonged to several historically important Peruvian owners and became especially known as one of the main properties of the Goyeneche family.
- Carmen Alto: 6 km away, with agricultural lands preserving Inca terraces.
- Paucarpata: 7 km from the center, another point from which Inca terraces can be observed. Its church houses canvases from the Cusco school. The site was where the agreement for the peaceful entry of the Chilean army into Arequipa was signed in 1879.

== Media ==
=== Television ===
The agreement that makes University Television possible is proof of Arequipa's development, both materially and spiritually, because the businessmen who direct Televisora Sur Peruana S.A. know that the economic progress of a people must lead to cultural progress.

— Newspaper publication of 1959

Television officially arrived in Arequipa on 15 August 1959, with an inauguration in the Cultural Pavilion of the National University of San Agustín. The initiative was promoted by entrepreneur Jack Dwyre through Televisora Sur Peruana - Canal 2 de Televisión, now TV UNSA. Programs were broadcast live, and the first inaugural broadcast presented Gladys Zender, who had been crowned Miss Universe in 1958. This made the National University of San Agustín the first higher-education institution in South America with a communication medium such as television. The Institute of Cultural Extension, directed by Dr. Gustavo Quintanilla Paulet, played a major role in this achievement. In 1962, Arequipa became the first city to broadcast a decentralized signal through Radio Televisión Continental (channel 6). In 1987, channel 8, owned by Compañía de Radiodifusión Arequipa S.A., was born; since 2012, it has broadcast as ATV Sur.

=== Radio ===
Although Lima carried out the first technical experiments in 1919 with Telefunken, and the first official radio station, OAX, appeared in 1925, Arequipa also took part in the process. In 1928 the city made its first radio tests, and in 1930 the first official radio station in the region, Radio Landa, was born. It was founded by Máximo Landa Valcárcel, an Arequipan engineer trained in Germany and the United States. Landa installed his first transmitter in the courtyard of his house on Sucre Street and broadcast on shortwave and longwave.

Despite limited resources and a scarcity of records, Radio Landa began journalistic work, focused on local affairs and became a space for singers, bands and local reciters, who performed live with audience participation. At that time, electricity in Arequipa was available only four hours per day, mainly in the central area.

Radio developed unevenly in Peru. While Arequipa saw its first advances in 1928, other regions, such as Tumbes, waited until the 1950s for radio to appear. In the north, broadcasting depended largely on affiliates of Radio Nacional del Perú, in contrast to Arequipa's local initiative, driven more by interest in technology than commercial reasons. After Radio Landa came Radio Arequipa and Radio Continental. Later, Radio Universidad joined the local radio scene. Continental, founded by the Umbert family, originally operated in Ica before moving to Arequipa in the 1940s, from where it retransmitted the First Bolivarian Eucharistic Congress.

In its early years, broadcasting centered on reading national news or adapting news from other sources. Radio journalism and investigative reporting developed later. The first radio journalists in Peru were often in sports, broadcasting races and events that newspapers could not cover immediately. Automobile race broadcasts became examples of cooperation between stations, each with its own transmission team.

Arequipan announcers have left a mark on Peruvian radio history. José Sagar Bejarano, Alfredo Bernal Murillo, Humberto Martínez Morosini, Iván Márquez and Zenaida Solís are remembered for their command of Spanish and dedication to radio work. Each local station developed its own personality, addressing regional matters and promoting local music and artists. Even today, radio stations in regions far from the capital continue to stand out for content focused on their communities and local problems.

=== Print media ===
The history of the press in Arequipa dates to the 19th century. In 1829 Arequipa Libre was launched, followed by publications including El Chili and El Misti in 1834, as well as El Pacificador, La Patria en Triunfo, El Pensador and El Restaurador in the same year. In 1835 El Yanacocha appeared, and between 1836 and 1837 El Republicano was published as a weekly. In 1839 La Gaceta Bicolor was introduced, along with newspapers such as La Bolsa, El Deber, La Patria, El Ariete and El Heraldo.

In 2023, in addition to newspapers such as El Pueblo and Diario Sin Frontera, several weeklies circulated in local journalism. One was Encuentro, known for analytical journalism. These weeklies offered detailed perspectives and analysis on topics including politics, culture, economics and local social events. They also included Mercados & Regiones, a business publication, and El Búho, devoted to politics and culture.

== Transportation ==
=== Road transport ===
==== Vehicle fleet ====
In the last decade, Arequipa has seen an increase in its vehicle fleet. Factors such as easier importation, urban growth, infrastructure improvements, migration and national economic reactivation contributed to the rise in vehicles. Between 2013 and 2022, the vehicle fleet in Arequipa grew by 144%, from 149,892 to 254,086 vehicles, including motor vehicles and non-motorized vehicles such as trailers and semi-trailers. In 2022, light vehicles made up 83.1% of the total, including automobiles, station wagons, pickup trucks, rural vehicles and vans. Heavy vehicles, including trucks, buses, tractors, trailers and semi-trailers, accounted for 16.9%.

==== Road network ====
The metropolitan road network has a radio-centric structure supported by four primary or trunk roads: Ejército Avenue, Jesús Avenue, Alcides Carrión Avenue, Variante de Uchumayo and Parra Avenue. These routes allow movement from intermediate and peripheral areas to activity centers. The longitudinal roads are connected by collector roads, forming a ring around the central area made up of Venezuela Avenue, Teniente Ferré, Progreso, Arequipa Avenue, Gómez de la Torre Avenue, La Marina Avenue, San Martín, Salaverry Avenue, Mariscal Cáceres, Malecón Socabaya and Venezuela Avenue. The system is complemented by main roads such as Cayma Avenue, Arequipa Avenue, Goyeneche Avenue, Kennedy Avenue, Dolores Avenue and Lambramani Avenue, which carry flows between local and collector roads.

==== Public transport ====
Public transport comprises 83 routes grouped into three service levels.

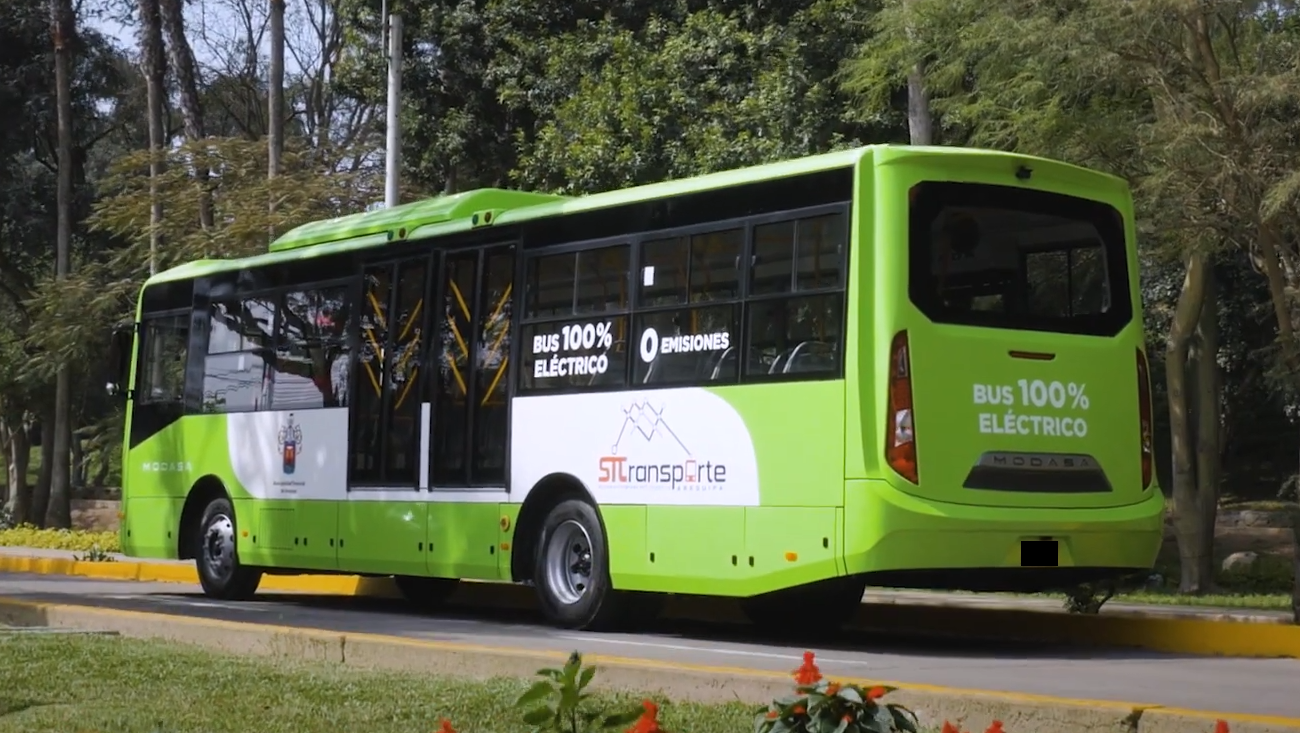
Electric bus on the BT1 line of the Integrated Transport System of Arequipa. The line has been in a pre-operational phase since 2019.

- Trunk routes, consisting of a pair of segregated lanes used by articulated buses on lines BT1 and BT2. The northern terminal is in Río Seco in Cerro Colorado district, and the southern terminal is in Lara in Socabaya district. As part of fleet renewal, the Integrated Transport System (SIT) placed its first fully electric bus in service. The unit, assigned to these routes, can carry 80 passengers and has a range of more than 350 km, enabling operation without CO2 emissions or noise.
- Feeder routes, 43 routes converging toward the trunk route. Nine operate in the northern and southern peripheries of the city, and 34 in intermediate zones.
- Structuring routes, 35 routes that provide direct service between their own origins and destinations.

Route concessions grant the right to operate the Mass Urban Passenger Transport System on the defined trunk, feeder and structuring routes, based on the listed business units.

Unit	Routes	Number of trips
C-1	BT1, BT2	2
C-2	A25, A27, A28, A29, A30, A32, A33, A37, A38	9
C-3	A5, A26, A31, A34, A36, A39	6
C-4	A14, A15, A40, A41, T13, T14, T15, T16, T17, T18, T38	11
C-5	A43, T7, T8, T35	4
C-6	T3, T4, T5, T11, T32, T33	6
C-7	A7, A10, T6, T9, T12, T37	6
C-8	A6, A21, T1, T2	4
C-9	A11, A12, A13, A18, A35, A44, T22, T23, T36	9
C-10	A19, A20, A22, A42, T19, T20, T21, T26, T28, T29, T30, T31	12
C-11	A1, A2, A3, A4, A8, A9, A17, A24, T24, T25	10

=== Air transport ===
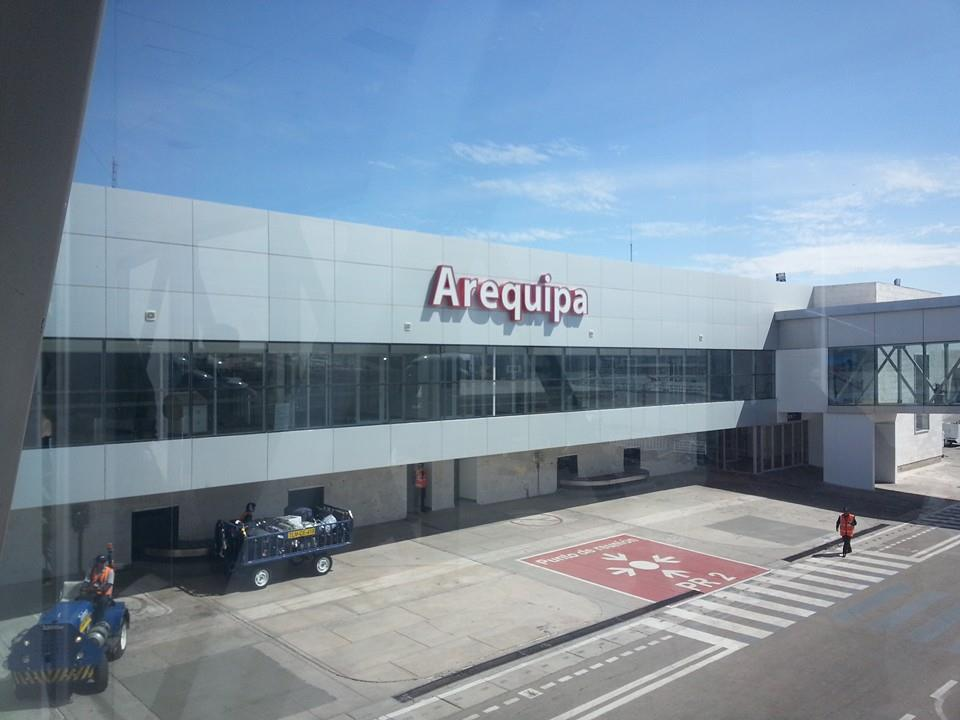
Rodríguez Ballón International Airport.

Arequipa is served by Rodríguez Ballón International Airport, located in Cerro Colorado District about 12 km northwest of the city center. It is considered one of the country's main airports because of its facilities and equipment, and since 2011 it has been administered by the Aeropuertos Andinos del Sur consortium.

In 2022, passenger movement at the airport reached 1.7 million, an increase of 88.3% over 2021. Compared with 2019, before the pandemic, it still showed a contraction of 12.6%. Domestic air traffic accounted for 98.8% of total flow, while international traffic represented the remaining 1.2%.

In passenger movement, domestic service represented 87.0% of pre-pandemic levels. International service exceeded those levels by 25.4% in the same period. This makes the airport the second busiest in southern Peru after Alejandro Velasco Astete International Airport in Cusco, and the third busiest nationally.

=== Rail transport ===
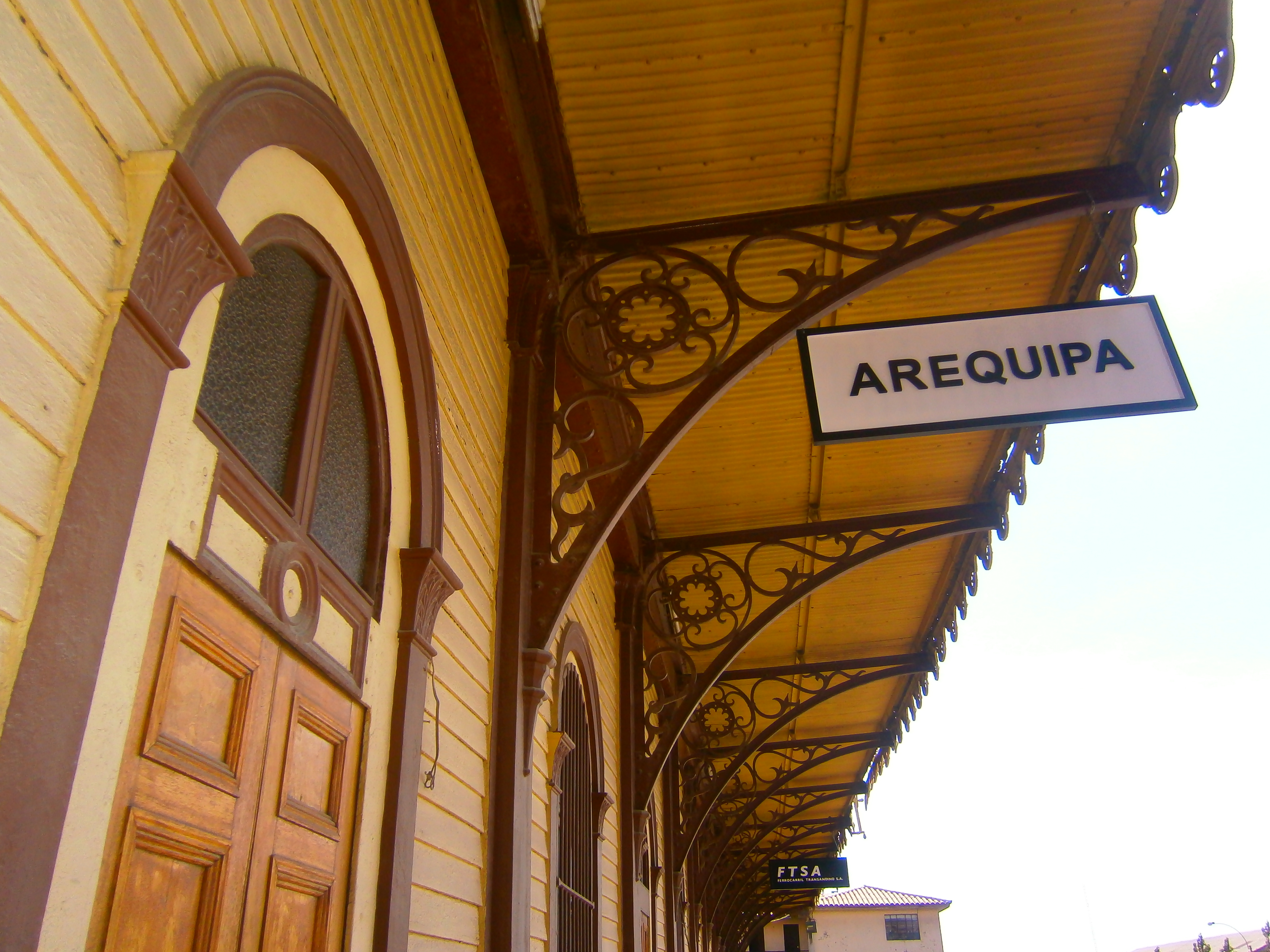
Arequipa railway station.

Arequipa's increasing importance in wool exports and the victory of the Arequipan rebellion of 1867 made possible the construction of the Arequipa railway, which turned the city into the axis of southern Peru. The railway system began to take shape in the 19th century with the construction of several lines. The most important line connected Arequipa with Mollendo, a crucial route for trade and communication with the coast. It was fundamental for transporting goods, especially during the boom in the export of alpaca wool and other regional products. Over time, Arequipa's railway system expanded to include connections with other major cities such as Puno and Cusco, strengthening the city's role as southern Peru's commercial center.

== Social welfare ==
Universities in Arequipa
University	Founded	Enrolled students (2023)
National University of San Agustín	1828	27,343
Catholic University of Santa María	1963	20,732
Universidad Católica San Pablo	2004	9,720
Universidad de La Salle	2012	1,133
Source: INEI statistical compendium.

=== Education ===
==== Early, primary and secondary education ====
The 14 districts that make up the city are estimated to have 45,410 students in early education, 156,758 in primary education, 296,770 in secondary education, 2,171 in special education and around 150,392 in vocational training.

==== Higher education ====
Arequipa is home to one public university and seven private universities.

Without denying the merit and importance of the public works for the fourth centenary of the Castilian foundation of the city, we consider more transcendent and unsurpassed the architectural beauty of the constructions conceived for the university city, an expression of Ibero-Andean tectonism, consonant with the Indian Mozarabic, regional, native physiognomy of the temples, colonial mansions and secular monuments that remain in this land of Inca mitimaes and Christian Mudéjars.

— Carlos Gibson Möller (1889-1954), rector of the National University of San Agustín

- The National University of San Agustín is noted for its three main campuses and for being Peru's second-largest public university, surpassed only by the National University of San Marcos. Most of its schools and faculties are in the Ciudad Universitaria de Independencia, whose development was conceived by architect Héctor Velarde in 1940 but not realized until 1962, when the university decentralized and moved to the new site. Its design follows an academic model inspired by the teachings of the École des Beaux-Arts, characterized by symmetry in the arrangement of elements and pavilions. This aesthetic influenced the development of a neo-colonial Arequipan style that in turn affected educational centers in Peru and Latin America. (Note: A good example of neo-Arequipan style is the building of Diario de la Nación in Buenos Aires on Florida Street, by architect Pirovano.) Its origins go back to the Royal and Pontifical University Intra claustra, founded on 22 January 1714, and to the Academia Lauretana of Sciences and Arts, established on 10 December 1821.
- Catholic University of Santa María
- University of San Martín de Porres
- Universidad Andina Néstor Cáceres Velásquez
- Universidad Alas Peruanas
- Universidad Católica San Pablo
- Technological University of Peru
- Universidad Continental

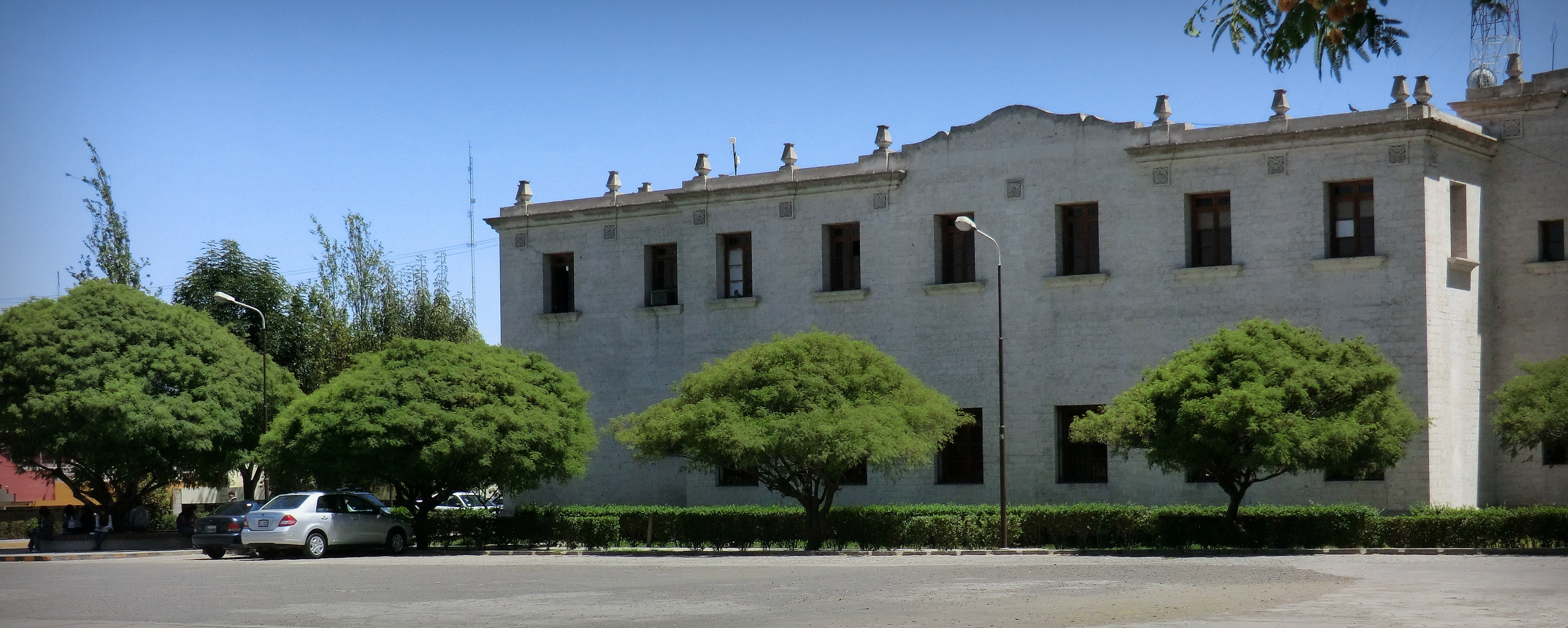
Ciudad Universitaria of the National University of San Agustín, located between Independencia and Venezuela avenues.

=== Health ===
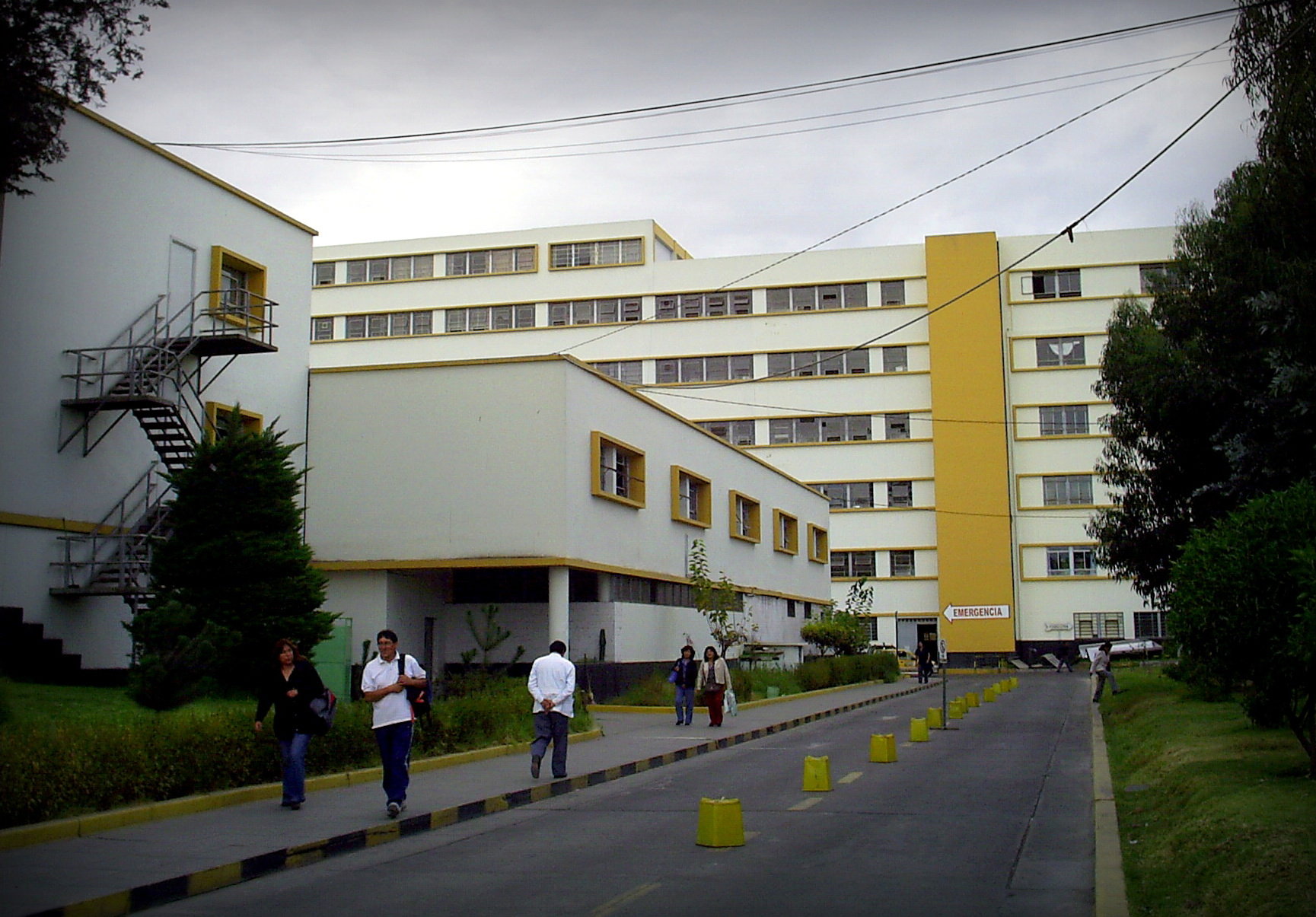
Honorio Delgado Espinoza Regional Hospital.

As the administrative and economic capital of the Arequipa Region, the city concentrates the largest number of public and private health centers, totaling 680 establishments. Public health institutions in the city include:

- EsSalud
  - Level I Hospital: Edmundo Escomel
  - Level III Hospital: Yanahuara
  - Level IV Hospital: Hospital Nacional Carlos Alberto Seguín Escobedo (HNCASE)
  - Metropolitan Polyclinic
  - Social Benefits Complex
- Ministry of Health (MINSA)
  - Honorio Delgado Espinoza Regional Hospital
  - Hospital II Goyeneche
- National Institute of Neoplastic Diseases (INEN)
  - Regional Institute of Neoplastic Diseases

== Cultural venues ==
=== Theatres ===
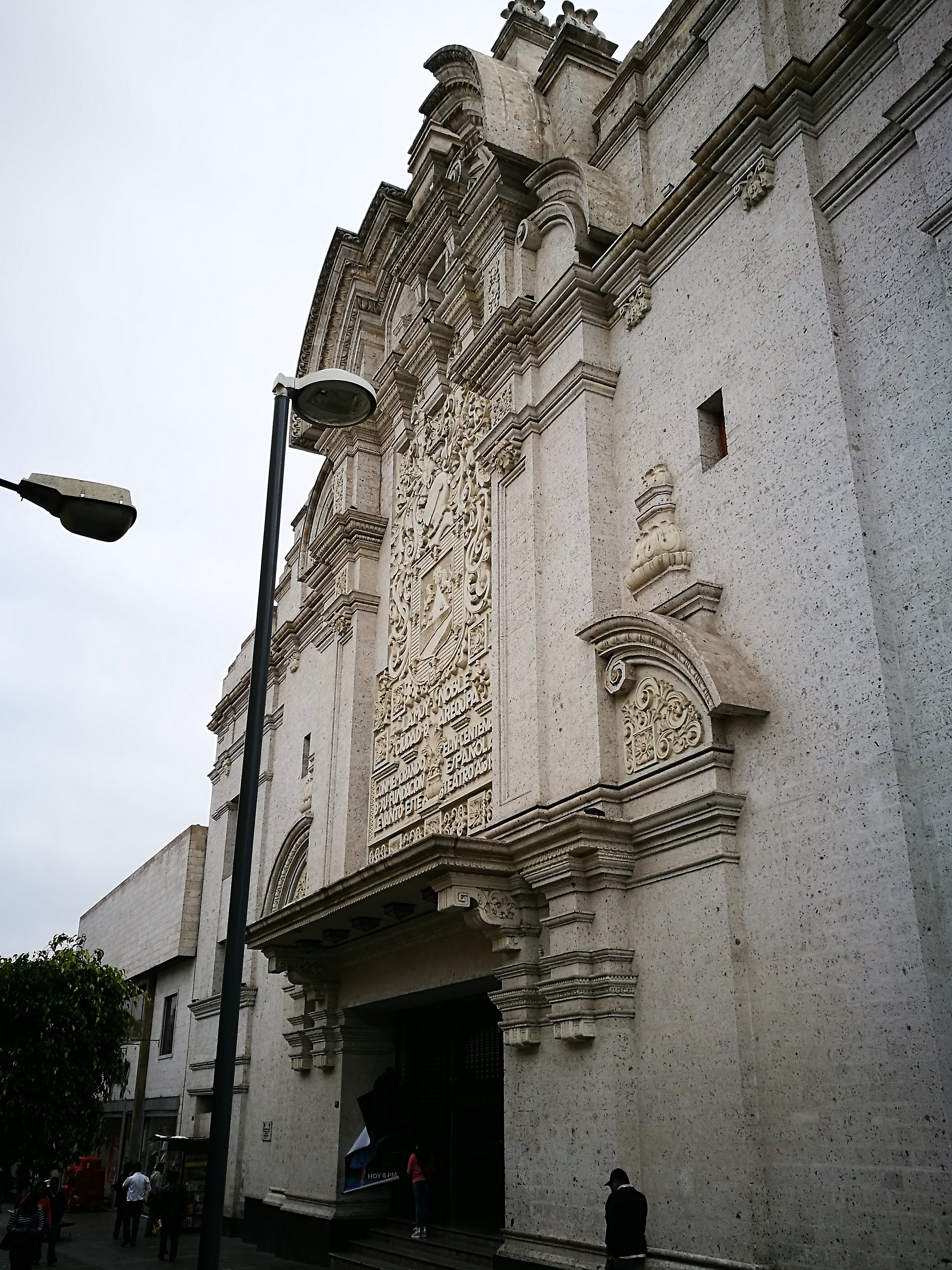
Teatro Municipal de Arequipa, built to commemorate the fourth centenary of the Spanish foundation of Arequipa.

Arequipa has several performance spaces adapted to different events and presentations:

- Cerro Juli Fairgrounds, which contains two main venues: the convention center, with capacity for 2,304 spectators, and exhibition pavilions for up to 4,259 people. It was concessioned for 30 years to the Asociación Empresarial Cerro Juli.
- Teatro Municipal de Arequipa, with 1,058 seats.
- Teatro Fénix, with 745 seats. It is Arequipa's oldest theatre, with capacity divided into 390 seats in the stalls, 104 in boxes, 108 in the gallery and 143 in the upper gallery.
- Teatro Ateneo, with capacity for 227 people.
- Centro Cultural Artescénica, in Yanahuara district, with a chamber theatre for 50 people.

=== Museums and cultural centers ===
Cultural activities are carried out mainly in cultural institutes; organizations such as the Alliance Française, the German-Peruvian Center and the Peruvian-North American Cultural Center organize activities in the arts, music, dance and literature. The Chávez de la Rosa Cultural Center of the National University of San Agustín and the Catholic University of Santa María also promote cultural activities.

In the 1990s, banking institutions showed interest in promoting and managing cultural activities; private companies also sponsored several projects.

The city's main cultural venues include:

- Virtual Room of Arequipa, located in the municipal portal, contains content related to the historic center's urban core, especially the World Heritage area and nearby spaces. Opened in June 2003, it allows visitors to appreciate the evolution of Arequipan architecture.
- Regional Museum of the Central Reserve Bank, with a numismatic room displaying banknotes and coins minted at the Central Reserve Bank of Arequipa in the 16th and 17th centuries. It also has a gallery with 17 18th-century paintings of the Cusco School and archaeological metal and ceramic pieces from the Chavín, Chimú, Moche, Virú, Recuay, Nasca and Inca cultures.
- Archaeological Museum of the University of San Agustín, located in a 17th-century casona, with lithic objects, remains of human sacrifices, ceramics and pre-Columbian textiles.
- UCSM Archaeological Museum, displaying about 1,000 objects from cultures that developed in the region from 12,000 BC to the colonial era, including Nasca, Tiahuanaco, Wari, Churajón, Acarí, Aruni and Inca, as well as transitional and colonial materials.
- Museo Santuarios Andinos of the Catholic University of Santa María, created on 26 March 1997 from the archaeological research of the "Santuarios de Altura del Sur Andino" project led by Johan Reinhard and José Antonio Chávez. It houses Mummy Juanita, sacrificed on Mount Ampato, though its museographic work has been criticized.
- Museum of Contemporary Art, devoted to painting and photography since 1900. It contains 20th-century art, photography and exhibitions of artists such as Miguel Vargas, Carlos Vargas, Martín Chambi and young local artists. It also exhibits works by Peruvian painters such as Fernando de Szyszlo, Carlos Enrique Polanco, Ramiro Llona, José Tola, Gerardo Chávez, Natalia Iguíñiz, Jaime Higa, Luz Letts, Carlos Runcie Tanaka, Amelia Weiss, Claudia Cuzzi and Venancio Shinki.
- Amazonian Museum, in Yanahuara, displaying objects related to missionary activity in the jungle during the 16th, 17th and 18th centuries.
- Forest Museum of the Ecological Police, in Paucarpata, with more than 300 species of Peruvian wildlife, especially endangered species, and 35 live animals.
- Museo de Arte Virreinal Santa Teresa, founded in 1710, remains an active community of contemplative nuns. Over more than 300 years the monastery has accumulated paintings, sculpture, furniture, metalwork, decorative arts, canvases, murals and everyday objects from different periods, origins and styles.
- Cathedral Museum, opened in 2011 during the closing activities of the Jubilee Year for the 400th anniversary of the Diocese of Arequipa. It has four rooms of religious cultural objects, including exceptional liturgical metal pieces, archbishops' garments, priestly habits, canvases from the Cusco school and works by Francisco Laso.
- Museo Convento La Recoleta de Arequipa, opened in 1978, occupies four cloisters of the old Franciscan convent (1648). It has 17 permanent exhibition rooms of archaeological, historical-artistic, liturgical, ethnographic and scientific holdings, as well as a library with documents and more than 25,000 volumes from the 16th to 18th centuries.
- Museum of Santa Catalina, one of the most important religious architectural complexes in Peru and viceregal America. Founded in 1579, it belongs to the Dominican order and still has cloistered nuns in a reserved area, showing the continuity of its religious conception.
- José María Morante Archaeological Museum, opened in 1933 in a historic late-viceregal building declared Cultural Heritage of the Nation. Its five permanent rooms display cultural goods from the earliest pre-Hispanic phases, the Churajón and Chuquibamba cultures and Inca influence, as well as viceregal and republican furniture and a major collection of 18th-century Cusco-school paintings.
- MUCEN Arequipa, opened in 2007, operates in the historic Casa Goyeneche and adjacent Casa Bustamante. It has rooms for numismatics, archaeology and colonial art.

== Arts and culture ==
=== Visual arts ===
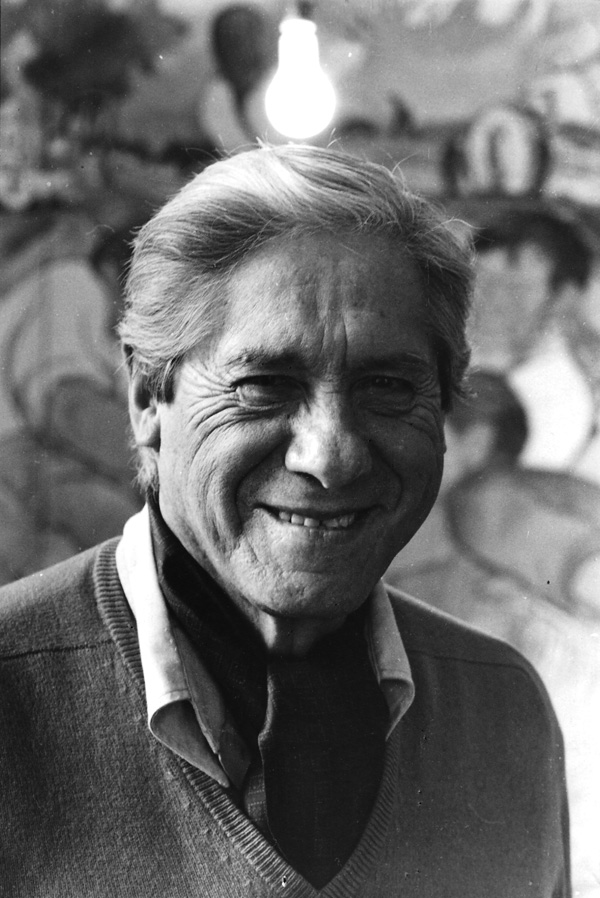
Teodoro Núñez Ureta, a self-taught Arequipan painter who directed Peru's National School of Fine Arts from 1973 to 1976.

Arequipa's artistic landscape is marked by a fusion of ancestral roots and contemporary currents. Its history goes back to pre-Columbian iconographic art, illustrated by petroglyphs and ceramics, with Toro Muerto as a key site. Scholars such as Dr. Eloy Linares Málaga and Dr. Antonio Núñez Jiménez devoted studies to these archaeological sites.

The arrival of Spanish colonizers opened a new era, merging Spanish and Indo-American influences. This amalgam is reflected in church architecture, the carving of walls and altars, and the emergence of mestizo painting. Although the latter resisted the currents of the European Renaissance, Arequipa was not excluded from international trends: currents from France, England and Spain left their mark and reformed local art.

Academic and Romantic art flourished in this setting. Pioneers such as Carlos Baca-Flor, Enrique Masías and Jorge Vinatea Reynoso marked the beginning of an era that eventually embraced contemporary art. The movement drew on the influence of masters such as Víctor Martínez Málaga, Teodoro Núñez Ureta, Alejandro Núñez Ureta and Enrique Urízar.

Contemporary Arequipa has produced artists experimenting with various styles, including Pablo Núñez Ureta, Luis Palao Berastain and José Ricketts. Spaces such as the Museum of Contemporary Art of Arequipa and the Michell company collection offer views of this legacy. Caricature is represented by Omar Zevallos and newer talents such as Valois Inga and Víctor Sanjinez.

Photography in Arequipa was shaped by the Vargas brothers. In the late 19th and early 20th centuries, Carlos and Miguel Vargas, through their studio "Vargas Hnos.", documented events, festivities, fashion and architectural change in the city. Their work goes beyond simple documentation and reflects the humanity and emotions of their subjects. Their legacy has been honored through exhibitions and recognition, keeping the Vargas brothers central to Peruvian photographic history.

=== Literature ===
Arequipa has a long regional literary tradition. Its roots go back to the city's colonial foundation, when chroniclers such as Pedro Pizarro, brother of the conqueror Francisco Pizarro, documented its early years. This initial period, influenced by cultural mestizaje and viceregal social dynamics, laid the foundations for literary development that later produced figures important to regional, national and Spanish-American literature. From its viceregal Golden Age, through Mariano Melgar as a foundational figure of Peruvian Romanticism, to the international recognition of Nobel laureate Mario Vargas Llosa, Arequipan literary production has reflected the transformations of each era.

==== The Arequipan Golden Age ====
During the viceroyalty, Arequipa saw the emergence of writers known as peruleros, who mixed European influences with Peruvian reality. The period produced literary works reflecting a society in transition, with strong influence from medieval thought and the Renaissance. Diego Martínez de Rivera and Alonso Picado stood out as poets and chroniclers.

Arequipa was also the birthplace of several writers linked to Peru's literary circle. Among them was Bishop Gaspar de Villarroel, recognized as a "prose writer of no ordinary kind, among the best in America in his time". The prominence of Arequipan literary production was recognized by Miguel de Cervantes, who praised Diego Martínez de Rivera in his Canto de Calíope as a "unique and solitary sun", and also praised General Alonso Picado for his valor. Other literary figures linked to the region include Miguel Cabello de Balboa, from a family settled in the city and author of a laudatory sonnet, and Fulgencio Maldonado, known as the Chantre of Arequipa, active in the cultural life of his time.

==== 19th century ====
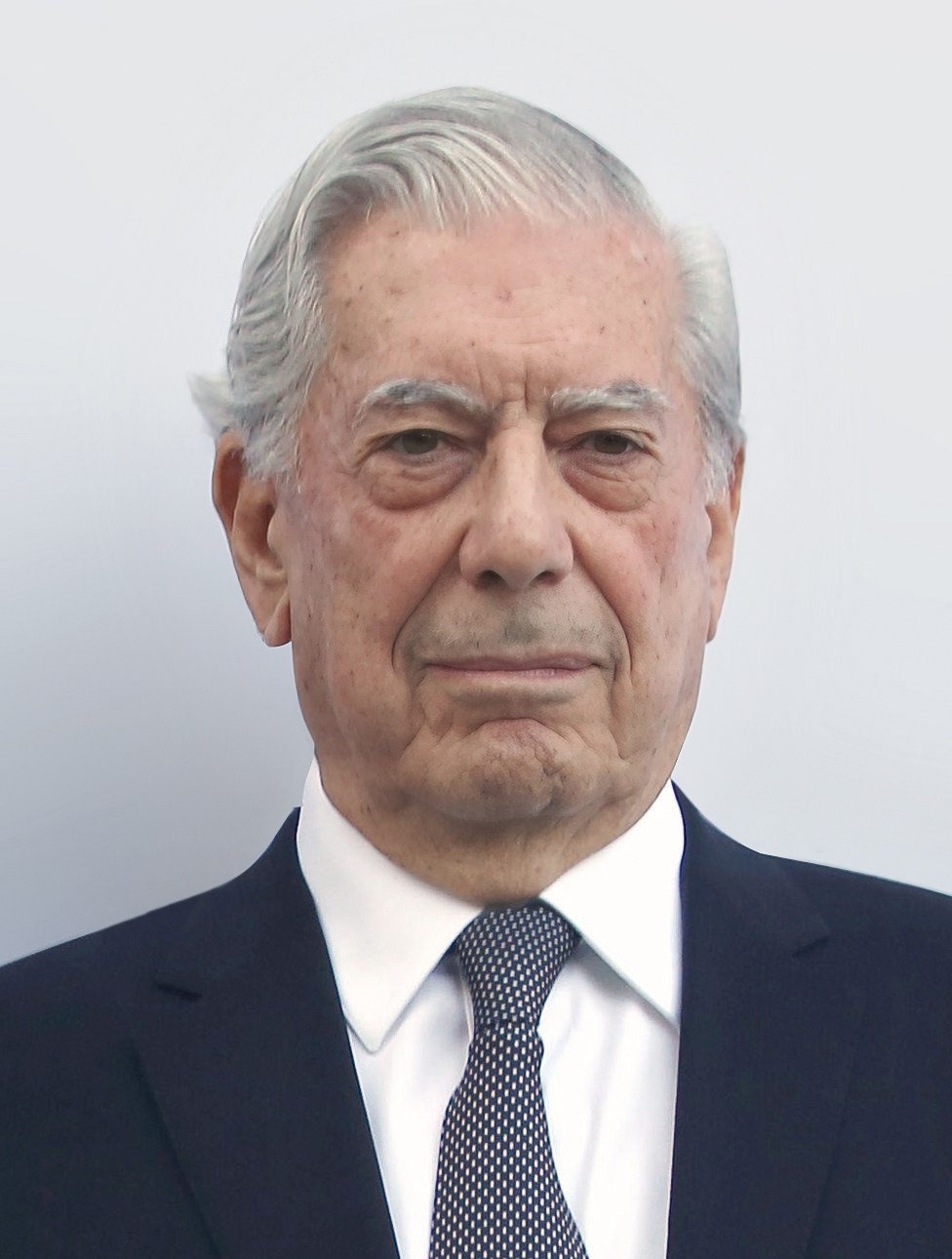
Mario Vargas Llosa, an Arequipan writer and one of the most important contemporary novelists and essayists. He received the 2010 Nobel Prize in Literature, the 1994 Cervantes Prize and the 1986 Prince of Asturias Award for Letters.

Juan Domingo Zamácola y Jáuregui stands out as a pre-independence chronicler of Arequipan traditions and histories. The libertarian spirit of the 19th century found its highest expression in Mariano Melgar, although his central role in Romanticism is only part of Arequipa's literary history. His work, imbued with Romanticism and the ideals of freedom, represents an era of transformation in local literature. His style and themes resonate with European Romantic movements, although his approach was distinctly Peruvian. Other poets such as Benito Bonifaz and Manuel Castillo also contributed to the period. Documents such as Historia de nuestra Señora de Cayma and accounts of the 1784 earthquake reflect the pulse of the era.

==== 20th century and modernization ====
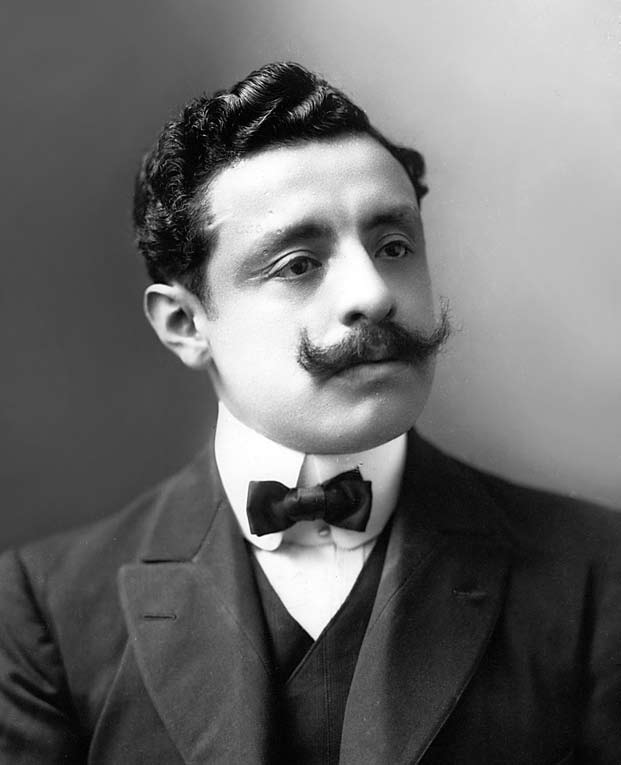
Pedro Paulet, born in Arequipa in 1874, was among the first to experiment with rocket propulsion and is considered by some the "Father of Modern Rockets" or "Father of Modern Astronautics".

The 20th century brought renewal to Arequipan literature. The literary group Aquelarre, led by Percy Gibson Moller, marked a milestone by introducing avant-garde styles and an evolved lyric. César Rodríguez Olcay and Renato Morales de Rivera contributed to this literary renaissance.

The end of the 19th century marked a transition with Manuel González Prada as a central figure. The 20th century introduced modernism in Arequipa through Grupo El Aquelarre, with Percy Gibson and César Atahualpa Rodríguez as leading figures. Abraham Valdelomar influenced this generation. In narrative, Augusto Aguirre Morales was important, and in literary criticism Antonio Cornejo Polar stood out. Nobel laureate Mario Vargas Llosa and Oswaldo Reynoso are major references, while the city has continued to produce talent such as José Ruiz Rosas, Aníbal Portocarrero and Jull Antonio Casas Romero.

Today, Arequipan writers face challenges such as limited visibility and restricted access to publishers. There have been calls to strengthen local and national cultural institutions to better promote Arequipan literature. Initiatives such as the "Biblioteca Juvenil de Arequipa", though valuable, require greater integration into education and popular culture.

=== Music and dance ===
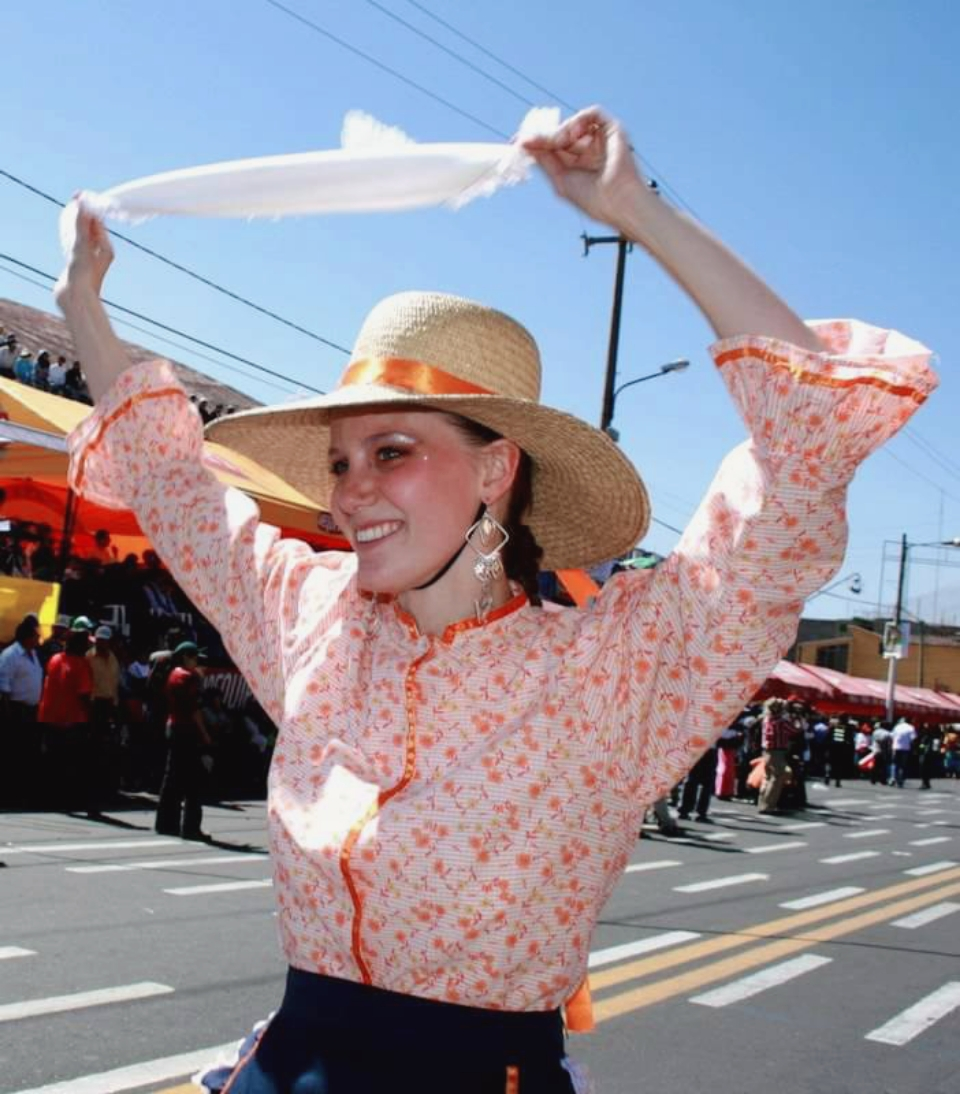
Arequipan carnival.

Since viceregal times, Arequipa has produced composers of academic music, including figures such as Mariano Melgar, better known for poetry, Pedro Jiménez de Abril Tirado and Florentino Díaz. The city consolidated itself as a center of composers with solid musical training.

In the republican era, several musicians fused European music with local elements. Manuel Lorenzo Aguirre de la Fuente, although not a professional musician, left a legacy in Manuel L. Aguirre de la Fuente. Legado musical, which includes analysis and scores of his compositions.

Luis Duncker Lavalle, nicknamed the "forger of mestizo music", integrated Andean melodies into European musical forms, especially in piano works. The Regional Conservatory of Arequipa is named in his honor. José María Octavio Polar Vargas, founder of the first Philharmonic Society in 1886, also contributed to Arequipan music as a teacher and chronicler.

Aurelio Díaz Espinoza, composer of Arequipa's anthem, was a prominent musician and composer who led the Regional School of Music and the Orchestral Association of Arequipa. Carlos Sánchez Málaga, pianist, teacher and composer, incorporated themes from traditional Arequipan music into his work and served as director of the National Conservatory of Music and founder of its first permanent choir.

In the 20th century, Roberto Ramírez Zevallos-Ortiz, Roberto Carpio Valdez and Juan Francisco Ballón Ballón left their mark on music. They were joined by Armando Sánchez-Málaga González, Benigno Ballón Farfán, known for yaravíes and marineras, especially the waltz "Melgar", and Mario Cavagnaro, whose works span waltzes such as "El Regreso", creole polkas, boleros, tonderos, marineras, huaynos and other genres.

=== Gastronomy ===
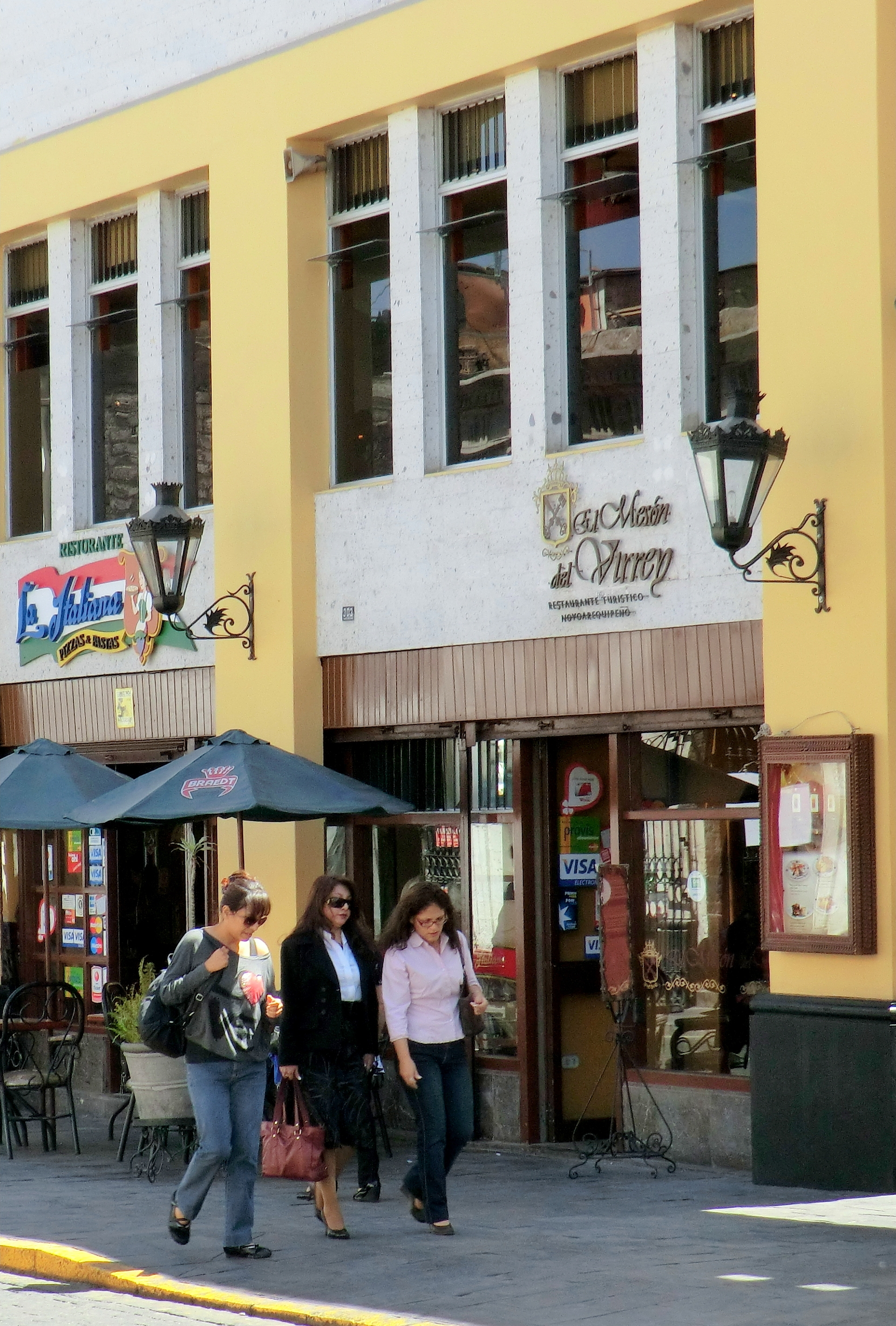
San Francisco Street has been a reference point in Arequipan nightlife since the 1950s.

Arequipa, sometimes called the "city with the greatest diversity of dishes in Peru", has a culinary tradition with more than 500 documented typical dishes. Works such as Alonso Ruiz Rosas's La gran cocina mestiza de Arequipa and the notes of Hernán Cornejo testify to this richness, documenting 40 starters, 11 chupes, 11 broths, 70 stews, 51 desserts and 11 drinks.

Arequipan gastronomy combines Andean ingredients with European culinary techniques, historically adapted to satisfy the preferences of European colonizers and merchants living in the region. A distinctive element is the picantería. Recognized in 2014 as Cultural Heritage of the Nation, picanterías not only serve food but also reflect local traditions and culture, adapting menus to ingredient availability.

Representative dishes include chupe de camarones, rocoto relleno and adobo arequipeño. Desserts include queso helado and buñuelos, and traditional drinks include chicha de guiñapo and regional anise liquor. In 2019, in recognition of its culinary tradition, Arequipa was included in the UNESCO Creative Cities Network in the gastronomy category.

== Sports ==
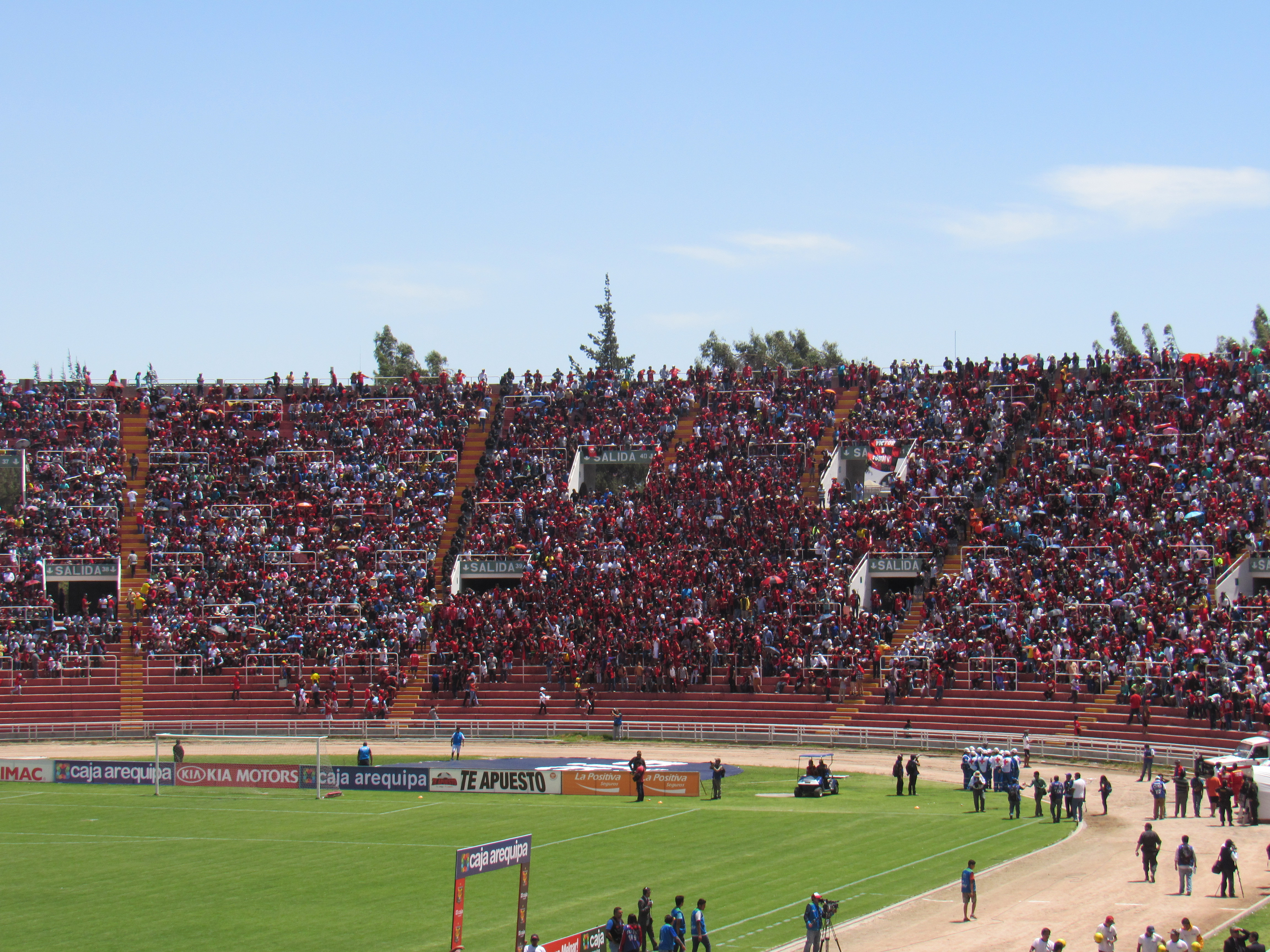
UNSA Monumental Stadium.

=== Football ===
The most followed sport in Arequipa is football, represented by FBC Melgar, which in 1981 became the first Peruvian champion from outside the Department of Lima since the Peruvian championship became the Torneo Descentralizado.

=== Sports venues ===
Sports venues in the city include:

- Estadio Monumental Virgen de Chapi, also known as Estadio Universidad Nacional San Agustín. It belongs to the National University of San Agustín and opened on 30 July 1995. With capacity for 60,370 spectators, it is Peru's second-largest stadium after the Estadio Monumental in Lima.
- Estadio Mariano Melgar
- Estadio de Umacollo

== Sister cities ==
Arequipa's sister cities are the following:

- Corrientes, Argentina (since 1973)
- La Paz, Bolivia (since 1973)
- Cochabamba, Bolivia (since 1990)
- Lins, Brazil (since 2007)
- Ponta Grossa, Brazil (since 2005)
- Arica, Chile (since 1991)
- Iquique, Chile (since 2005)
- Valparaíso, Chile (since 1989)
- Constanza, Dominican Republic (since 2024)
- Chengdu, China (since 2018)
- Guangzhou, China (since 2004)
- Zibo, China (since 2007)
- Gyeongju, South Korea (since 2015)
- Cádiz, Spain (since 2025)
- Charlotte,North Carolina, United States (since 1962)
- Maui County, Hawaii, United States (since 1994)
- Vancouver, Washington, United States (1961-1993)
- Biella, Italy (since 1985)
- Florence, Italy (since 2007)
- Colima, Mexico (since 2018)
- Guanajuato, Mexico (since 2004)
- Monterrey, Mexico (since 1996)
- Morelia, Mexico (since 1991)
- Puebla de Zaragoza, Mexico (since 2004)
- El Tocuyo, Venezuela (since 2007)

== See also ==
- Cities of Peru
- Historic Centre of Arequipa
- Himno Arequipeño
- Arequipa Region
- Metropolitan areas of Peru
- Intendancy of Arequipa
- Tourism in Peru
- Rodríguez Ballón International Airport

== Bibliography ==
=== Books ===
- Alviña, Leandro (1919). La música incaica: lo que es, y su evolución desde la época de los incas hasta nuestros días (in Spanish). Lit. Columbia, Sección Editorial.
- Ángeles Caballero, César Augusto (1964). César Vallejo: su obra (in Spanish). University of Michigan.
- Angulo Rincón, Lizandro (2010). Voseo, el otro castellano de América (PDF) (in Spanish). Universidad del Tolima.
- Arellano, Fernando (1988). El Arte Hispanoamericano (in Spanish). Universidad Católica Andrés Bello. ISBN 9789802440177.
- Banco Central de Reserva del Perú (2006). "3". Arequipa, perfil Económico (in Spanish) (illustrated ed.).
- Barriga, Víctor M. (1940). Arequipa y sus blasones (in Spanish). Editorial La Colmena.
- Basadre, Jorge (1963). El Perú republicano y los fundamentos de su emancipación (in Spanish). Sociedad Académica de Estudios Americanos.
- Basadre, Jorge (1981). Sultanismo, corrupción y dependencia en el Perú republicano (in Spanish). Milla Batres.
- Bernedo Málaga, Leonidas (1949). La cultura Puquina o la Prehistoria de la provincia de Arequipa (in Spanish) (illustrated ed.). Dirección de Educación Artística y Extensión Cultural.
- Bethell, Leslie (1991). The Cambridge History of Latin America: Latin America since 1930 (illustrated ed.). Cambridge University Press. ISBN 9780521266529.
- Benavides Rodríguez, Alfredo (1990). La arquitectura en el virreinato del Perú y en la capitanía general de Chile (in Spanish) (illustrated ed.). Andrés Bello.
- Carricaburo, Norma (1997). Las fórmulas de tratamiento en el español actual (PDF) (in Spanish). Arcos Libros. ISBN 847635278-6. Archived from the original (PDF) on 25 September 2013.
- Centty Villafuerte, Eymor B. (2002). Informe Pymes de Arequipa 2002 (in Spanish). Banco Central de Reserva del Perú. Archived from the original on 18 January 2009.
- Chanfreau, Marie-Françoise (1995). La vivienda en los pueblos jóvenes de Arequipa y Trujillo: creación de una nueva tipología regional (PDF) (in Spanish). Instituto Francés de Estudios Andinos. Archived from the original (PDF) on 7 November 2012.
- Comisión Andina de Juristas (1991). Lecturas sobre temas constitucionales, Issue 7 (in Spanish). University of Texas.
- Congreso de Irrigación y Colonización del Norte (1929). Anales del primer Congreso de irrigación y colonización del norte, celebrado en Arequipa en diciembre de 1928 (in Spanish). Lima: Imprenta del Estado.
- Contreras, Carlos (2004). El aprendizaje del capitalismo: Estudios de historia económica y social del Perú republicano (in Spanish). Instituto de Estudios Peruanos. ISBN 9789972510977.
- Dávalos y Lissón, Pedro (1863). La primera centuria: causas geográficas, políticas y económicas que han detenido el progreso moral y material del Perú en el primer siglo de su vida independiente. Tomo II (in Spanish). Biblioteca Nacional del Perú: Librería e Imprenta Gil.
- Diario El Peruano (1927). El Peruano: Diario oficial (in Spanish). Lima: La Opinión Nacional.
- Feldman, Anita (2006). Arequipeña y otras crónicas (in Spanish). Villegas Editores.
- Fergusson, James (1862). History of the Modern Styles of Architecture Being a Sequel to the Handbook of Architecture by James Fergusson. National Central Library of Florence.
- Ferreyros, Carlos (1959). Historia de la pampa de Amancaes (in Spanish). Tip. Peruana.
- Galdós Rodríguez, Guillermo (1997). Una ciudad para la historia, una historia para la ciudad: Arequipa en el siglo XX (in Spanish). Universidad Nacional de San Agustín.
- Garayar, Carlos (2004). Atlas Regional: Arequipa (in Spanish). Ediciones Peisa. ISBN 9972-40-315-7.
- Carlos Garayar, Germán Coronado, Martha Muñoz de Coronado, Walter H. Wust (2003). Atlas departamental del Perú: Arequipa, Moquegua (in Spanish). Ediciones Peisa.
- Gómez Zanabria, Gonzalo J. (2024). Arequipa y el Bicentenario. El proceso de la independencia, conmemoración y espacio públicos (PDF) (in Spanish). Ministerio de Cultura del Perú; Municipalidad Provincial de Arequipa.
- González Prada, Manuel (1908). Horas de lucha (in Spanish). Ediciones de La Bolsa.
- Gutiérrez, Ramón (1994). Evolución histórica urbana de Arequipa Metropolitana 1540-1990 (in Spanish) (illustrated ed.). ISBN 9788489034013.
- Hernández Astete, Francisco (1996). El arte de la arquitectura virreinal arequipeña (in Spanish). Universidad Nacional San Agustín.
- Linares Málaga, Eloy (1990). Pre historia de Arequipa (in Spanish).
- Love, Thomas (1995). Cash Cows and Fighting Bulls: Redefining Identity, Maintaining Control in Southwestern Peru (PDF). Department of Sociology/Anthropology of Linfield College.
- Luis Guillermo Lumbreras; Pablo Macera; Luis Millones Santa Gadea; Fernando de Trazegnies Granda (2002). El patrimonio cultural del Perú, Volumen 2 (in Spanish). Editorial Universo.
- Mc Evoy, Carmen (1997). La utopía republicana: ideales y realidad en la formación de la Cultura Política Peruana, 1871-1919 (in Spanish). Fondo Editorial PUCP. ISBN 9972420620.
- Martin Hummel, Bettina Kluge and María Eugenia Vásquez Laslop (2010). Formas y fórmulas de tratamiento en el mundo hispánico (PDF) (in Spanish). ISBN 978-607-462-064-1.
- Miró Quesada, Aurelio (1998). Historia y leyenda de Mariano Melgar (1790-1815) (in Spanish). Universidad Nacional Mayor de San Marcos. ISBN 9789972460616.
- Monguió, Luis (1967). "Don José Joaquín de la Mora y el Perú de mil ochocientos". Don José Joaquín de Mora (in Spanish). University of California Press.
- Morote Best, Efraín (1960). Breña: historia y tradición (in Spanish). Librería Internacional del Perú.
- Mostajo, Francisco (1922). "La cédula que concedió a Arequipa el título de Ciudad". Boletín Bibliográfico (in Spanish). Universidad Nacional Mayor de San Marcos.
- Neira, Máximo (1990). Historia general de Arequipa (PDF) (in Spanish). Fundación M.J. Bustamante de la Fuente. Archived from the original (PDF) on 30 July 2020.
- Oviedo y Baños, José de (1723). Historia de la conquista y población de la provincia de Venezuela (in Spanish). Imprenta de Juan Félix Delisle.
- Pardo Gámez de Belaunde, Adela (1967). Arequipa: su pasado, presente y futuro (in Spanish).
- Palma, Ricardo (1893). Tradiciones peruanas (in Spanish). Vol. III. Barcelona: Montaner y Simón.
- Patronato Popular y Porvenir Pro Música Clásica (1985). La Música en el Perú (in Spanish). Lima: Patronato Popular y Pro Música Clásica. p. 121.
- Paz Soldán, Manuel de (1877). Diccionario geográfico estadístico del Perú (in Spanish). Imprenta del Estado.
- Ponce, Fernando (1960). La ciudad en el Perú (in Spanish). Arequipa: Retablo de Papel.
- Prescott, William H. (1947). Historia de la conquista del Perú (in Spanish) (illustrated ed.). Editorial Iberia.
- de la Riva Agüero, José (1858). Memorias y documentos para la historia de la independencia del Perú (in Spanish). Librería de Garnier Hermanos.
- Ruiz de Somocurcio, Jorge (1957). El folklore de la costa norte del Perú (in Spanish). Editora Peruana.
- San Cristóbal, Antonio (1997). Arquitectura planiforme y textilográfica virreinal de Arequipa (in Spanish). Universidad Nacional de San Agustín, Facultad de Arquitectura y Urbanismo. pp. 227–228. ISSN 0259-9600.
- Sánchez Lihón, Daniel (1989). El arte peruano (in Spanish). Universidad Nacional Mayor de San Marcos. ISBN 9789972460418.
- Seoane, Manuel (1965). La revolución que el Perú necesita (in Spanish). University of Texas.
- Tauro del Pino, Alberto (2001). Enciclopedia Ilustrada del Perú (in Spanish). PEISA.
- Universidad de San Martín de Porres. Escuela Profesional de Turismo y Hotelería. Instituto de Investigación (2005). El impacto económico de la cultura en Perú (in Spanish). Universidad de San Martín de Porres. ISBN 978-958-698-171-2.
- Vargas Ugarte, Rubén (1981). Historia General del Perú (in Spanish). Carlos Milla Batres.
- Villanueva Sotomayor, Julio Ernesto (1993). El folklore en el Perú, Volumen 1 (in Spanish). Universidad Nacional Mayor de San Marcos.
- Zarauz Navarro, José Luis (1998). Quién es quién en la historia del Perú (in Spanish). Bruño.
- Zevallos Quiñones, Juan (1982). Historia de Arequipa (in Spanish). Editorial Juan Mejía Baca.

=== Publications ===
- América Economía (2012). "Las mejores ciudades para hacer negocios". Especiales (in Spanish). América Economía. Archived from the original on 15 December 2013.
- Cáceres-Péfaur, Beatriz (2006). "La visita de Simón Bolívar a la ciudad de Arequipa (Perú). Visión de la historiografía local contemporánea" (PDF). Presente y Pasado, Revista de Historia (in Spanish) (11). ISSN 1316-1369. Archived from the original (PDF) on 24 September 2015.
- Banco Central de Reserva del Perú (2002). Arequipa: principales atractivos turísticos (PDF) (Report) (in Spanish).
- Coaguila Valdivia, Jaime Francisco (2010). "Recetario para una construcción relacional de la identidad arequipeña" (PDF). Jueces, Abogados y Escribanos (in Spanish). Archived from the original (PDF) on 1 February 2014.
- Consejo Nacional del Ambiente (2005). Gesta Zonal de Aire, Arequipa (PDF). Plan a limpiar el aire (Report) (in Spanish). Consejo Nacional del Ambiente. Archived from the original (PDF) on 1 February 2014.
- Cornejo Velásquez, Hernán (2006). "El simbolismo de la comida arequipeña" (PDF). Investigaciones Sociales (in Spanish). 17. Lima: Universidad Nacional Mayor de San Marcos.
- Cotler, Julio (2009). Programa de las Naciones Unidas para el Desarrollo (ed.). Poder y cambio en las regiones (PDF) (Report). Serie Desarrollo Humano (in Spanish). Instituto de Estudios Peruanos.
- Dirección de Estadística (1878). Resumen General de Censo General de habitantes del Perú de 1876 (Report) (in Spanish). Imprenta del Estado.
- Espinosa Morales, K. J.; Hernández Aguilar, A.; Mantilla Pinilla (2016). "La participación de la minería y sus beneficios económicos en Colombia y Perú" (PDF). In Vestigium Ire (in Spanish). 10.
- García de los Reyes Arquitectos y Asociados (2012b). Plan de Desarrollo Metropolitano de Arequipa (Report) (in Spanish). Vol. Memoria Síntesis. Municipalidad Provincial de Arequipa. Archived from the original on 25 May 2022.
- Gerencia Regional de Salud de Arequipa (2007). Análisis de situación de salud (PDF) (Report) (in Spanish). Gobierno Regional de Arequipa.
- Guajardo Castro, Alejandro (2009). Aspectos morfosintácticos del habla loncca en la campiña arequipeña (PDF) (Report) (in Spanish). Maestría de Lingüística de la Universidad Nacional Mayor de San Marcos.
- Guillemette, Martín (2010). La revolución mexicana y sus impactos en América Latina: una propuesta de análisis a nivel local. El caso de Arequipa, Perú (PDF). México y sus revoluciones (XIII Reunión de historiadores de México, Estados Unidos y Canadá) (in Spanish). Institut des Hautes Etudes de l'Amérique Latine.
- Grup, Franz (2010). Gaceta cultural del Perú (PDF) (Report) (in Spanish). Instituto Nacional de Cultura. Archived from the original (PDF) on 4 February 2014.
- Instituto Municipal de Planeamiento (IMPLA) (2016a). Ordenanza Municipal 961 (Report) (in Spanish). Instituto Municipal de Planeamiento.
- Instituto Municipal de Planeamiento (IMPLA) (2016b). Reglamento PDM (Report) (in Spanish). Instituto Municipal de Planeamiento.
- Instituto Municipal de Planeamiento (IMPLA) (2016c). Memoria PDM (Report) (in Spanish). Instituto Municipal de Planeamiento.
- Instituto Municipal de Planeamiento (IMPLA) (2016d). Sistema Vial (PDF) (Report) (in Spanish). Instituto Municipal de Planeamiento. Archived from the original (PDF) on 22 April 2024.
- Instituto Nacional de Estadística (1944). "Relación de los censos parciales levantados en el Perú después del censo general de 1876". Censo de población y ocupación de 1940 (Report) (in Spanish). Instituto Nacional de Estadísticas.
- Instituto Nacional de Estadística e Informática (2015). Perú: Estimaciones y Proyecciones de Población Total por Sexo de las Principales Ciudades, 2000-2015 (PDF) (Report) (in Spanish). Instituto Nacional de Estadística e Informática.
- Instituto Nacional de Estadística e Informática (2017). Perú: Perfil Sociodemográfico. Informe Nacional. Censos Nacionales 2017: XII de Población, VII de Vivienda y III de Comunidades Indígenas (PDF) (Report) (in Spanish). Instituto Nacional de Estadística e Informática.
- Instituto Nacional de Estadística e Informática (2023). "Hábitat humano". Perú: Anuario de Estadísticas Ambientales 2022 (PDF) (Report) (in Spanish). Instituto Nacional de Estadística e Informática.
- Instituto Nacional de Estadística e Informática (2025). Estado de la Población Peruana 2025. Una mirada hacia la población adulta mayor (Report) (in Spanish). Instituto Nacional de Estadística e Informática.
- Instituto Nacional de Estadística e Informática (2022). Perú: 50 años de cambios, desafíos y oportunidades poblacionales (PDF) (Report) (in Spanish). Instituto Nacional de Estadística e Informática.
- INEI (2002). Almanaque de Arequipa (Report) (in Spanish). Instituto Nacional de Estadística e Informática.
- López de Romaña, Flavia (2006). Casos de Gestión Cultural en el Perú (PDF) (Report) (in Spanish). Instituto Nacional de Cultura.
- Menéndez y Pelayo, Marcelino (1894). Historia de la poesía hispanoamericana. T. 2 (Report) (in Spanish).
- Mincetur (Ministry of Foreign Trade and Tourism) (2017). Arequipa, Export Investment Guide (PDF) (Report). Ministerio de Comercio Exterior y Turismo. Archived from the original (PDF) on 7 November 2012.
- Ministerio de Transportes y Comunicaciones (2023). Anuario Estadístico 2023 (PDF) (Report) (in Spanish). Oficina de Estadística del Ministerio de Transportes y Comunicaciones.
- Municipalidad Provincial de Arequipa (1990). Diagnóstico del Centro Histórico de Arequipa (Report) (in Spanish). Municipalidad Provincial de Arequipa.
- Municipalidad Provincial de Arequipa (2002). "Diagnóstico del Centro Histórico de Arequipa". Plan Maestro del Centro Histórico de Arequipa (Report) (in Spanish).
- Municipalidad Provincial de Arequipa (2013). Reglamento de Organización y Funciones (PDF) (Report) (in Spanish). MPA. Archived from the original (PDF) on 15 July 2023.
- Municipalidad Provincial de Arequipa (2018). Bases del Proceso de Concesión del Servicio Público de Transporte Regular de Personas de la Provincia de Arequipa, en el marco del Sistema Integrado de Transporte (SIT) (PDF) (Report) (in Spanish). Archived from the original (PDF) on 11 August 2024.
- Municipalidad Provincial de Arequipa (30 November 2000). Historical Center of the City of Arequipa, Compendio Normativo (Report).
- Oficina de Planificación y Gestión Urbano Ambiental (2002). "Zonificación Industrial". Aspecto Normativos del Plan Director (PDF) (Report) (in Spanish). p. 11. Archived from the original (PDF) on 6 March 2007.
- promPerú (2003). Peru (PDF). Travel Planner 2003 (Report). Archived from the original (PDF) on 20 February 2006.
- promPerú (2008). Destinos (PDF). PromPerú (Report) (in Spanish). Vol. Arequipa.
- Robles, Elmer (2006). "Origen de las universidades más antiguas de Perú" (PDF). Revista Historia de la Educación Latinoamericana (in Spanish). 8 (1). Archived from the original (PDF) on 7 November 2012.
- Tavera, Hernando (2011). "Cuantificación del Tamaño del Terremoto de Arequipa del 23 de junio de 2001" (PDF) (in Spanish). Archived from the original (PDF) on 20 January 2010.
- Tribunal Constitucional (2011). Ley Orgánica del Tribunal Constitucional (PDF) (Report) (in Spanish).
- Rivarola, José Luis (1986). "El español del Perú: Balance y perspectiva de la investigación". Lexis (in Spanish). X (1).
- Vargas Gutiérrez, José Luis (2002). "Arequipa, en búsqueda del León perdido". Paradigma (in Spanish) (2).
- Maldonado Zedano, Soledad (2014). "Arequipeñismos y localismos en las tradiciones de Ricardo Palma". Revistas Ricardo Palma (in Spanish). 8 (1).
- Gamio Pino, Mauricio Miguel (2020). "Manifestaciones literarias y construcción de identidades: el caso de Arequipa". La Vida y la Historia (in Spanish). 7 (2).
