= Borda =

Borda may refer to:

- Qaṣīda al-Burda, a famous Sufi poem.
- Borda (building) or borde, traditional cattle farmers' buildings in the Pyrenees, a barn, sheepfold, or stable
- Places in India
  - Borda, Goa, a town and suburb of the city of Margao in the state of Goa, India
  - Borda, Maharashtra, a village in Osmanabad district of Maharashtra State, India
  - Borda, Bhopal, a village in Madhya Pradesh, India
- Borda da Mata, a municipality in Minas Gerais, Brazil
- Borda, the Hungarian name for Burda village, Budureasa Commune, Bihor County, Romania
- Borda (crater), a lunar crater
- Borda (legendary creature), in the culture of the Emilia-Romagna of the Po Valley, Italy
- Borda count, a single-winner election method
- Borda–Carnot equation in fluid dynamics
- BORDA, Bremen Overseas Research and Development Association
- House of Borda, family name of a French-Spanish noble house
- Hospital Borda, the largest and most notable psychiatric hospital in Argentina

== People ==
- Aritz Borda (born 1985), a Spanish footballer
- Carol Borda (born 1995), Colombian politician
- César Borda (1993–2019), an Argentine footballer
- Deborah Borda (born 1949), an American orchestra executive
- Itxaro Borda (born 1959), French writer in Basque language
- Jean-Charles de Borda (1733–1799), a French mathematician, physicist, political scientist, and sailor
- Lidia Borda (born 1966), an Argentine tango singer
- Soleil Borda, an American teen actress
- Lino (Carmel) Gauci Borda (1936–2019), Maltese politician
- Manuel Borda, Maltese politician
- Arturo Borda (1883–1953), a Bolivian surrealist painter
- Pepe Serret Borda (1941-1993), a Spanish businessman
- Anapaola Borda Rodas (born 2004), Argentine chess master

== Ships ==
- French ship Borda, six different French naval ships named Borda

== See also ==
- Bourda, a cricket ground in Georgetown, Guyana
