= Sillar =

Variety of rhyolite containing fragments of andesite

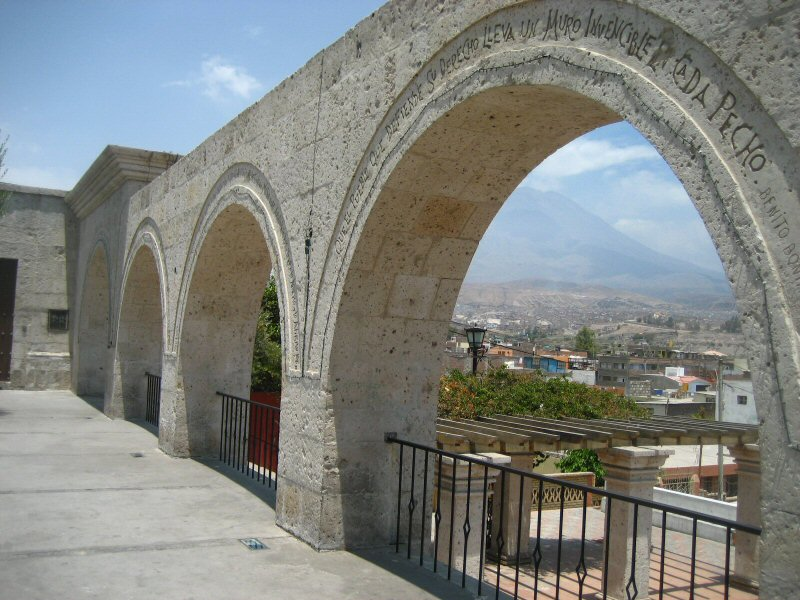
Arches of the "Mirador of Yanahuara" in Arequipa are made of sillar.

Sillar is a variety of rhyolite, which is a type of volcanic rock. Although sillar is of rhyolitic composition, it has been erupted from volcanoes which mostly erupt andesite lava, and sillar contains small fragments of andesite. A pink variety of sillar owes its colour to crystals of hematite within the rock. A white variety lacks these hematite crystals. Sillar is found as pyroclastic flow deposits of tuff near volcanoes in southern Peru, for example the now-extinct Chachani volcano which erupted flows of sillar during the Pleistocene epoch.

Sillar facies Orvieto-Bagnoregio Ignimbrite (black blocks of scoria in red tuff) occurs at Civita di Bagnoregio in the Vulsini volcanic district of central Italy.

== Building stone ==
Sillar has been used as a building stone in Peru. Many colonial buildings in the city of Arequipa are made of sillar, for example, the arches of the "Mirador of Yanahuara" in Arequipa, from which the entire city can be viewed.

== See also ==
- Monastery of Santa Catalina de Siena, Arequipa
- Casa del Moral – cultural heritage site in Peru
- Goyeneche Palace – Arequipa, Peru
- Misti – Stratovolcano in Peru
