= Goyeneche Palace =

Goyeneche Palace may refer to any of a number of palaces in Peru and Spain which are associated with the Goyeneche family. They are listed in order of the town in which they are situated:

- Goyeneche Palace, Arequipa, Peru
- Goyeneche Palace, Illana, Spain
- Goyeneche Palace, Lima, Peru
- Goyeneche Palace, Madrid, Spain (better known as the Real Academia de Bellas Artes de San Fernando)
- Goyeneche Palace, Nuevo Baztán, Spain
