= House of Borda =

Coat of arms of the Borda family (French branch).

The Borda family is a French-Navarrese family belonging to an ancient lineage of Basque nobility. Their ancestral palace is situated in the Spanish village of Maya, present day Amaiur, in the valley of Baztán, and there is also mention of an archaic castle in Labort in the Kingdom of Aquitaine, now France, from which the family is said to have originated.

== History ==
The Borda family rose to prominence in the 17th and 18th centuries and was connected to many of the old noble families of Navarre, such as the Escors, Goyeneche, Arrachea and Echenique. Various members of the family had their nobility proven and confirmed by the courts of Navarre, with letters patent from 1702, 1736, 1764, 1786, 1774. During the 18th century the Borda family enriched itself through trade with the South American colonies and several of its members obtained important posts in the colonial administration in the viceroyalty of Lima.

As only the firstborn male was allowed to inherit entailed property, several members of the Borda family emigrated to the Spanish Americas during and after the colonial reign, and many descendants are still to be found in Argentina, Bolivia, Colombia and Peru. After the Napoleonic invasion in 1808 French army occupied the Borda palace, as well as other properties of the family for several years, causing the financial ruin of the once prosperous family. Since then the Borda palace has been in the property of the state, functioning as headquarters of the Guardia Civil, until it was sold to a private consortium that has turned it into a boutique hotel.

The original French lineage was extinguished in the male line already in 1845, according to the historian and genealogist Bachelin-Deflorenne.

== Heraldic Coats of Arms ==
There are several different heraldic coats of arms related to the different branches of Borda-families. The Navarrese house of Borda (in Maya and Pamplona) had the following:

Per fess, the base chequy Or and Sable, the chief Gules charged with a crescent chequy Sable and Argent, points downward.

The head of the house had a blason quartered with the arms of Arrechea, Echenique and Baztán, which can still be seen on the facade of the palace.

The Biscay branch (in the county of Irún) had:

On Gules, a griffin rampant Or.

The Chile/Peru branch:

A tower Gules and a cord proper in orle; a bordure Argent charged with eight crescents Azure.

== People ==
Navarrese branch:

- Manuel Tomás de Borda y Bértiz (Maya, 1710–1784), Knight of the Order of Santiago and lord of the House of Borda.
- Joaquín Vicente Borda y Goyeneche (Pamplona 1744–1818), Knight of the Order of Carlos III and alcalde of Pamplona.
- José Antonio de Borda y Echeverría (Lima, 1699–?), lawyer and civil servant to the Viceroyalty of Peru. Rector of the San Marcos University.
- Josefa de Borda y Rallo (Lima, 1760–?), II marquesa of Fuente Hermosa de Miranda, in her own right.
- Juan Idiarte Borda y Soumastre (Mercedes 1844 – Montevideo 1897), president of Uruguay from 1894 until he was assassinated in 1897.

French branch:

- Etienne de Borda (?–1582), field marshal and captain.
- Bertrand de Borda (Dax, 1582–1627), knight and lord of Sort, Brutail and Josse.
- Jean-Charles, chevalier de Borda, (Dax, 1733–1799) was a mathematician, physicist, political scientist, and sailor.
