= Ana of the Angels Monteagudo =

Peruvian nun

Blessed Ana of the Angels Monteagudo O.P.

Religious
- Born: Ana Monteagudo Ponce de Leon; 26 July 1602 Tarrannum; Arequipa, Peru
- Died: 10 January 1686 (aged 83); Arequipa, Peru
- Venerated in: Roman Catholic Church
- Beatified: 2 February 1985, Arequipa, Peru by Pope John Paul II
- Feast: 10 January
- Attributes: Dominican habit

Ana Monteagudo Ponce de Leon, OP (26 July 1602 – 10 January 1686), also known as Ana (or Ann) of the Angels Monteagudo, was a Peruvian Catholic nun in the Dominican Order.

Monteagudo studied under nuns in her childhood and decided to become one following a vision she had of Catherine of Siena showing her the Dominican habit. Her parents made the effort to dissuade her from this though she continued to pursue that path until she was inducted as a member of the Dominicans. She became noted for her holiness and held leadership positions due to her wisdom and the esteem that others had for her.

Pope John Paul II beatified Monteagudo in 1985 upon his apostolic trip to Peru.

== Life ==
Ana Monteagudo Ponce de Leon was born in mid-1602 in Peru as the fourth of eight children to the Spanish-born Sebastián Monteagudo de la Jara and the Peruvian Francisca Ponce de Leon. Her brother Francisco became a priest. Her other siblings were:

- Mariana (married Gabriel López de Pastrana)
- Catalina (married Gonzalo Tamayo)
- Juana
- Inées (married Bernardino de Meneses)
- Andrea
- Sebastián

Monteagudo was educated at the Santa Catalina de Siena convent in Arequipa, Peru since her parents entrusted her to the care of the nuns there in 1605 and returned home in 1616 before deciding to become a nun. Yet it was at this stage that her parents wanted to give her in marriage though while home a vision of Saint Catherine of Siena showing her a Dominican habit prompted her to leave home. The child Domingo led her to the convent before her parents discovered what she had done. The pair tried to dissuade her and offered her jewels though she refused each offer. Her father soon came to accept and support her decision though her furious mother never did and forbade her to ever return home. She became a postulant of the Dominican Nuns in 1616 despite the objections of her parents and became a full member of it later in 1618. Monteagudo served as the convent's sacristan from her profession until 1632 when she was made the novice mistress and held that post until 1645 when she was named as its prioress.

King Philip IV of Spain, who was a secular Dominican himself, appeared to Monteagudo after his death in 1665 and asked for her intercession while later revealing to her that he had entered Heaven three days after his death following her prayers. She admired and was devoted to Saint Nicholas of Tolentino and beheld a vision of the Blessed Virgin Mary, the saint, and a legion of angels where the saint showed her the purgatory.

The nun died in 1686 and her remains were interred in the convent where she resided for most of her life. The final decade saw her struggle with a disease that had rendered her blind and frail.

== Beatification ==
The informative phase of the beatification cause opened soon after her death on 17 July 1686 and later concluded at an unspecified time while an apostolic process later opened and concluded its work on 18 December 1903. Monteagudo's spiritual writings were approved by theologians on 25 August 1909, and on 13 June 1917 Pope Benedict XV formally opened her cause and named her a Servant of God. Pope Paul VI later confirmed her heroic virtue and named her as Venerable.

Pope John Paul II acknowledged a single miracle attributed to her intercession in a decree issued on 30 March 1981 and thus approved her beatification. This took place sometime later on 2 February 1985 when the pope visited Peru.

The current postulator for this cause is the Dominican priest Vito Tomás Gómez García.

== See also ==
- Santa Catalina da Siena Monastery
- Catholic Church in Peru
- Antonia Luzmila Rivas López
