= Casa del Moral =

Ancestral house in Peru

Coordinates: 16°23′49″S 71°32′16″W

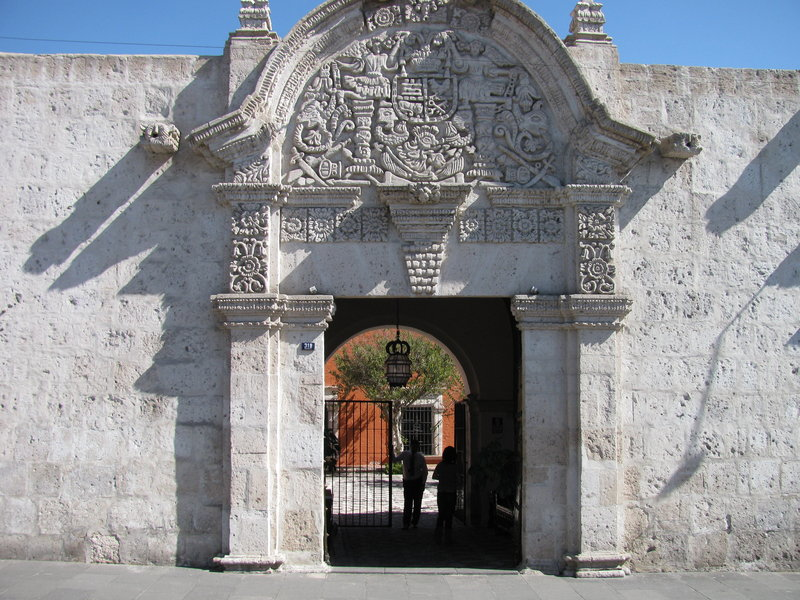
Outside view of Casa del Moral

The "Casa del Moral" (House of the mulberry tree) is a large ancestral house built around 1730 in Arequipa, Peru. Favored by tourists, it is one of Peru's best and most well-preserved samples of Andean Baroque civil architecture. The name of the house derives from the emblematic presence of a centennial tree of "moras" (Mulberry) in the center of the main patio of the large house.

The Casa del Moral houses a collection of paintings from the "Escuela Cusqueña" (Cusco School), a colonial art form. Its library contains more than 3,000 volumes, primarily hispanic literature. The house is currently the property of the Peruvian bank Bancosur.

== See also ==
- Santa Catalina Monastery
- Goyeneche Palace, Arequipa
- Arequipa, ciudad de luz y terremoto
- Sachaca, pueblo tradicional de Arequipa
- “Casa del Moral” - in Spanish
- AQPlink - in Spanish
