= Goyeneche =

Goyeneche may refer to:

== People ==
- José Manuel de Goyeneche, 1st Count of Guaqui (1776–1846), royalist general in the Spanish American wars of independence
- Roberto Goyeneche (1926–1994), Argentine tango singer
- Vicente Carvallo y Goyeneche (1742–1816), Chilean soldier

== See also ==
- Goyeneche Palace (disambiguation)
