= Goyeneche Palace, Illana =

Goyeneche Palace
- Palacio de los Goyeneche (Spanish)
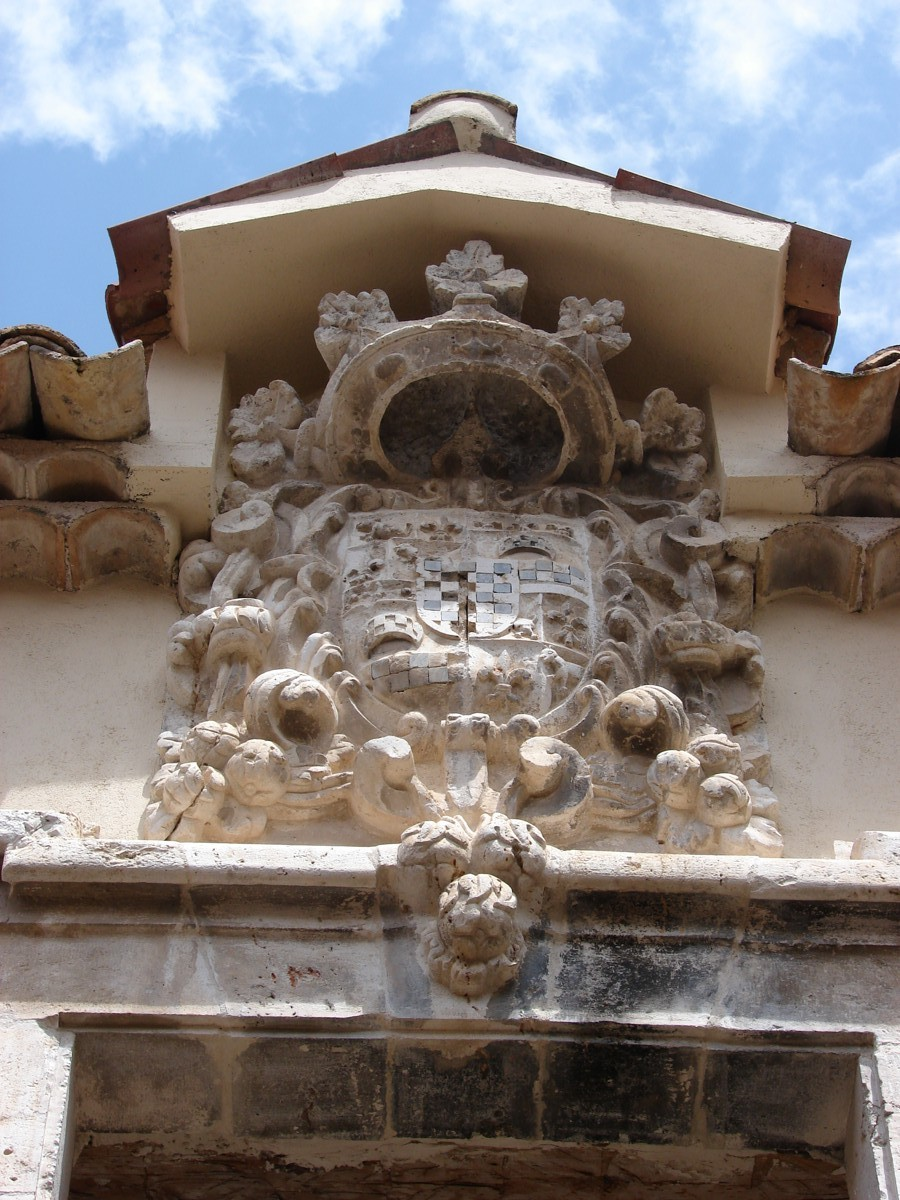
- a heraldic shield

- Location within Spain
- 40.184403°N 2.90787°W
- Location: Illana, Spain

Spanish Cultural Heritage
- Official name: Palacio de los Goyeneche
- Type: Non-movable
- Criteria: Monument
- Designated: 1992
- Reference no.: RI-51-0007281

The Palace of the Goyeneche (Spanish: Palacio de los Goyeneche) is a baroque palace located in Illana, Spain. The building is one of a number of palaces in Spain and Peru which are associated with the Goyeneche family.

The palace has not been well preserved, but it was declared Bien de Interés Cultural (a heritage listing) in 1992.
