= Borda, Maharashtra =

Village in Maharashtra

Borda is a small village in Osmanabad district in the state of Maharashtra, India. It is 9 km from Kalamb, the tehsil office of Borda.
