= French ship Borda =

Six ships of the French Navy have borne the name Borda in honour of Jean-Charles de Borda. From 1839 it has been a tradition that the main schoolship of the École navale, a repurposed capital ship, be renamed Borda in this role.

== Ships of the French Navy named Borda ==
- A 10-gun brig (1834–1849))
- Commerce de Paris (1807–1884), a 110-gun ship of the line, lead ship of her class, was renamed Borda in 1839 and used as a schoolship until 1863.
- Valmy (1849–1891), a 120-gun ship of the line, was renamed Borda in 1864 and used as a schoolship from that point on, replacing the ex-Commerce de Paris in that role.
- Intrépide (1864–1889), a 90-gun Algésiras-class steam ship of the line, was renamed Borda in 1890 and used as a schoolship, replacing the ex-Valmy in that role.
- Tonquin (1873–1899), transport, renamed Duguay-Trouin in 1900 and then Borda in October 1913, replacing the previous Borda. She was the last in that tradition of school ships.
- The hydrographic ship Borda (A 792), presently in service
Ships of the French Navy named Borda
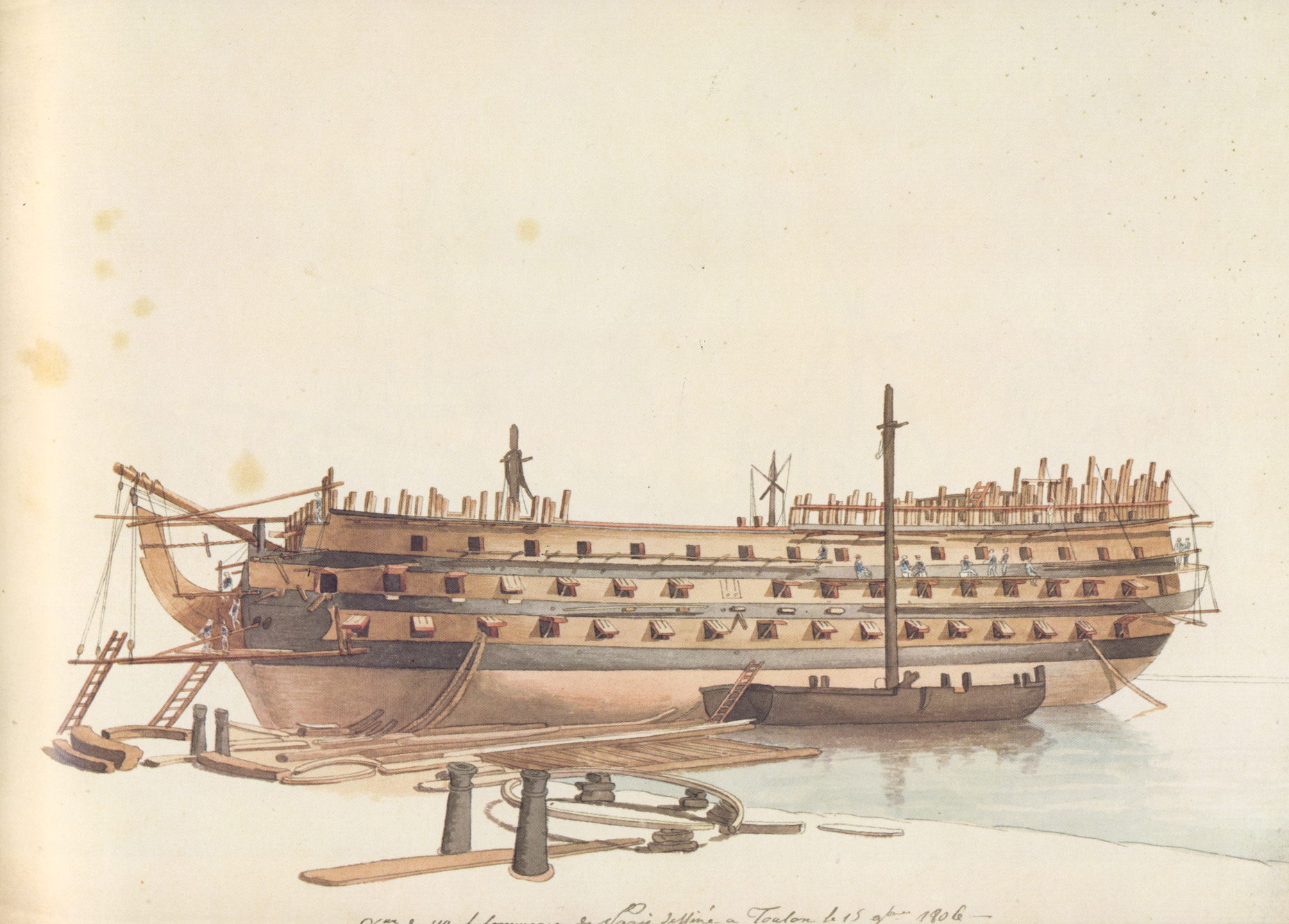
Commerce de Paris under construction in Toulon on 15 November 1806, by Antoine Roux.

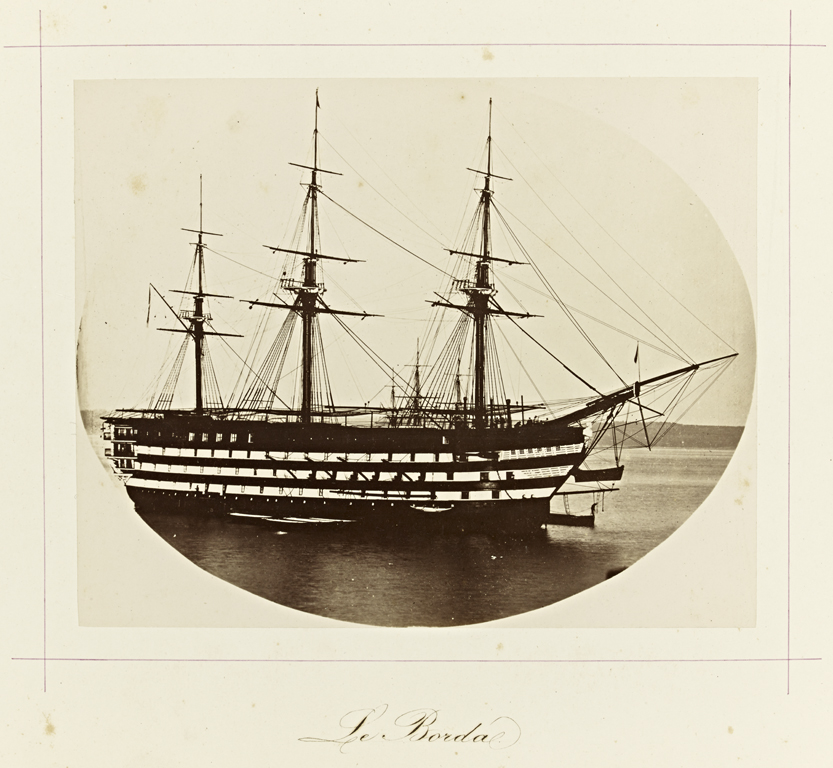
Valmy, by then renamed Borda, serving as a school ship

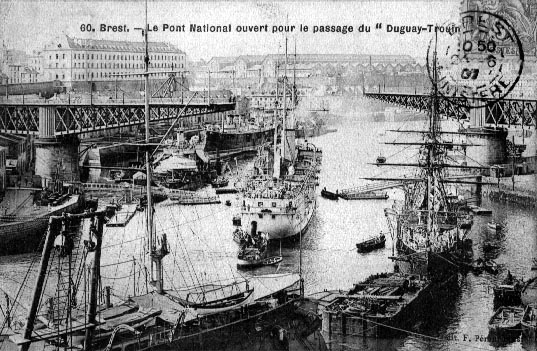
Tonquin in Brest in 1901

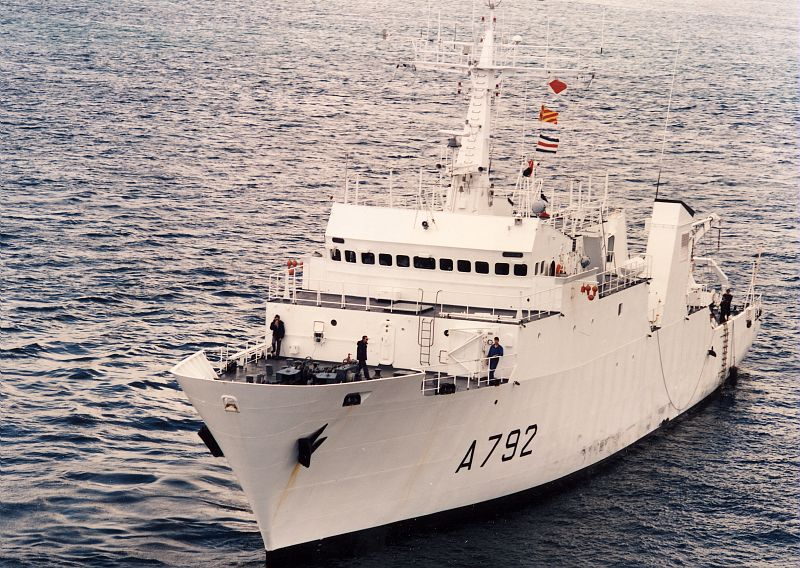
Borda (A 792)

== Notes and references ==
=== Bibliography ===
- Roberts, Stephen (2021). French Warships in the Age of Steam 1859–1914. Barnsley: Seaforth. ISBN 978-1-5267-4533-0.
- Roche, Jean-Michel (2005). Dictionnaire des bâtiments de la flotte de guerre française de Colbert à nos jours. Vol. 1. Group Retozel-Maury Millau. p. 79. ISBN 978-2-9525917-0-6. OCLC 165892922.
- Roche, Jean-Michel (2005). Dictionnaire des bâtiments de la flotte de guerre française de Colbert à nos jours. Vol. 2. Group Retozel-Maury Millau. ISBN 978-2-9525917-0-6. OCLC 165892922.
