= Borda, Bhopal =

Borda
- village
- Location within Madhya Pradesh Location within India
- Coordinates: 23.120393°N 77.368175°E
- Country: India
- State: Madhya Pradesh
- District: Bhopal
- Tehsil: Huzur

Population (2011)
  - Total: 1,143
- Time zone: UTC+5:30 (IST)
- ISO 3166 code: MP-IN
- Census code: 482524

Borda is a village in the Bhopal district of Madhya Pradesh, India. It is located in the Huzur tehsil and the Phanda block.

== Demographics ==
According to the 2011 census of India, Borda has 234 households. The effective literacy rate (i.e. the literacy rate of population excluding children aged 6 and below) is 53.46%.

Demographics (2011 Census)
	Total	Male	Female
Population	1143	585	558
Children aged below 6 years	204	109	95
Scheduled caste	79	47	32
Scheduled tribe	69	38	31
Literates	502	273	229
Workers (all)	371	307	64
Main workers (total)	361	303	58
Main workers: Cultivators	47	45	2
Main workers: Agricultural labourers	243	198	45
Main workers: Household industry workers	1	0	1
Main workers: Other	70	60	10
Marginal workers (total)	10	4	6
Marginal workers: Cultivators	1	1	0
Marginal workers: Agricultural labourers	6	1	5
Marginal workers: Household industry workers	0	0	0
Marginal workers: Others	3	2	1
Non-workers	772	278	494
