= Goyeneche Palace, Arequipa =

Coordinates: 16.4299°S 71.5670°W

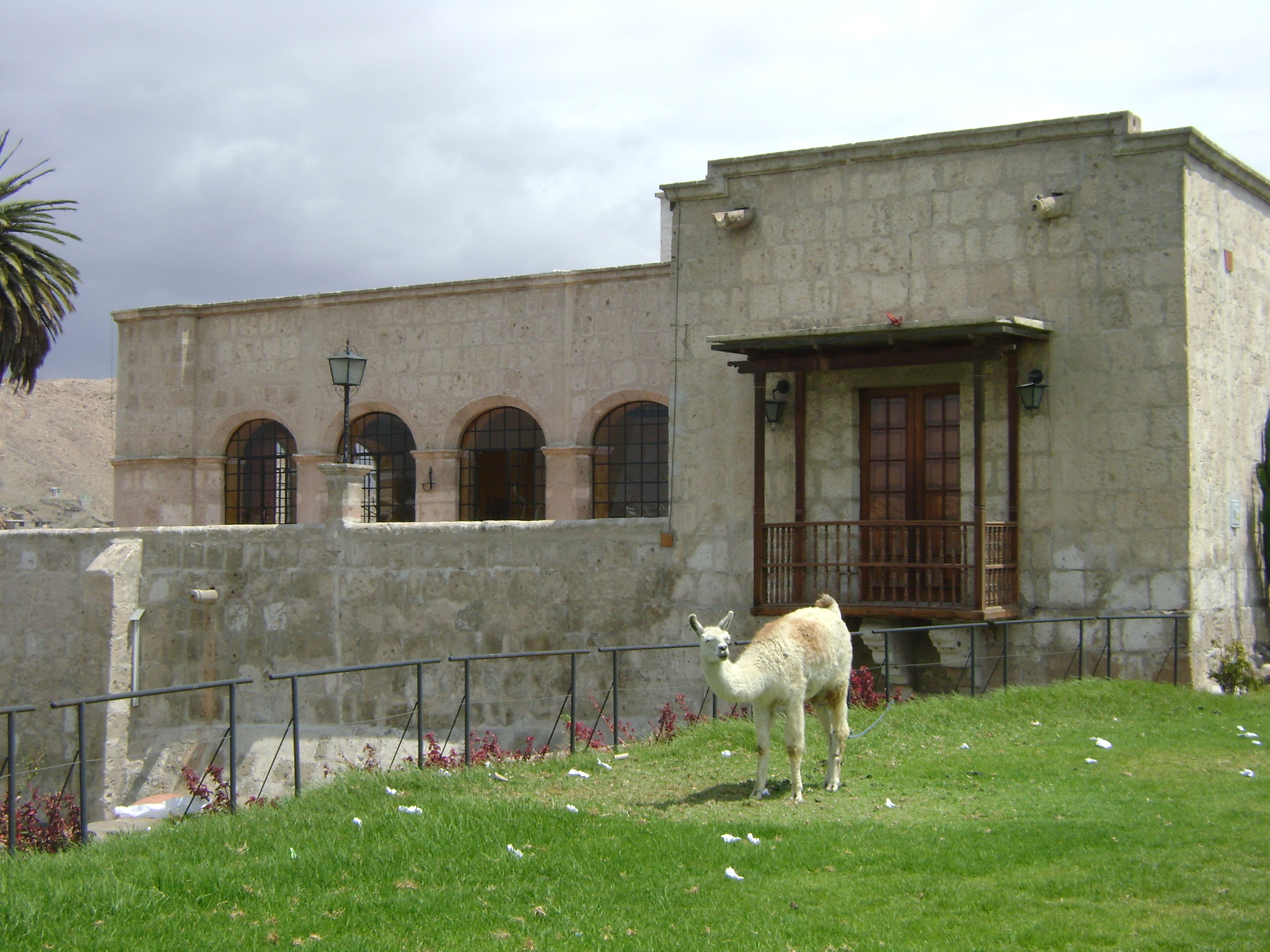
Goyeneche House in Arequipa

Goyeneche Palace or Casa Goyeneche is a 17th-century manorial house in the city of Arequipa, Peru. It attracts tourists interested in observing colonial architecture in Peru. Located on La Merced street, the house looks much the same as other manorial houses of those times. It has ample patios, arched ceilings, doors and windows in typical colonial baroque style as well as a balcony.

In the eighteenth century the building was acquired by the Goyeneche family from northern Spain. The façade shows the shield of Jose Sebastian de Goyeneche, bishop of Arequipa and later archbishop of Lima. Nowadays it hosts the Banco Central de Reserva branch offices in Arequipa.

== See also ==
- Santa Catalina Monastery
- Casa del Moral
- Arequipa
