= César Borda =

Argentine footballer (1993–2019)

Personal information
- Full name: César Gabriel Borda
- Date of birth: 19 April 1993
- Place of birth: Lanús, Argentina
- Date of death: 27 February 2019 (aged 25)
- Place of death: Lanús, Argentina
- Height: 1.78 m (5 ft 10 in)
- Position: Defender

Youth career
- 2000–2013: Lanús

Senior career*
Years	Team	Apps	(Gls)
2013–2014	Lanús	0	(0)
2015–2018	Talleres	88	(1)
2018–2019	UAI Urquiza	19	(0)
Total		107	(1)
- * Club domestic league appearances and goals

César Gabriel Borda (19 April 1993 – 27 February 2019) was an Argentine professional footballer who played as a defender.

== Career ==
Borda's career began with Lanús; signing in 2000. He made his senior bow for the Primera División team in 2012–13, appearing for the full duration of a Copa Argentina win over UAI Urquiza - a future club of his. In January 2015, Borda completed a move to Primera C Metropolitana's Talleres. One goal in thirty-four matches followed in his first campaign, which ended with promotion to Primera B Metropolitana - where he'd play fifty-four times across three years. On 20 June 2018, Borda was signed by UAI Urquiza. He featured in nineteen matches for them, before making his last appearance against ex-club Talleres on 19 February 2019.

== Personal life ==
On 27 February 2019, Borda was found deceased at his home in Lanús by his father; having committed suicide by hanging, aged twenty-five. He had been experiencing issues with his wife, with whom he had a nine-month old daughter.

== Career statistics ==
Appearances and goals by club, season and competition
Club	Season	League			Cup		Continental		Other		Total	
Club	Season	Division	Apps	Goals	Apps	Goals	Apps	Goals	Apps	Goals	Apps	Goals
Lanús	2012–13	Primera División	0	0	1	0	—		0	0	1	0
Lanús	2013–14	Primera División	0	0	0	0	0	0	0	0	0	0
Lanús	2014	Primera División	0	0	0	0	0	0	0	0	0	0
Lanús	Total		0	0	1	0	0	0	0	0	1	0
Talleres	2015	Primera C Metropolitana	34	1	0	0	—		0	0	34	1
Talleres	2016	Primera B Metropolitana	7	0	1	0	—		0	0	8	0
Talleres	2016–17	Primera B Metropolitana	25	0	0	0	—		0	0	25	0
Talleres	2017–18	Primera B Metropolitana	22	0	0	0	—		0	0	22	0
Talleres	Total		88	1	0	0	—		0	0	88	1
UAI Urquiza	2018–19	Primera B Metropolitana	19	0	1	0	—		0	0	20	0
Career total			107	1	3	0	0	0	0	0	110	1
