= Illana =

Illana, Spain
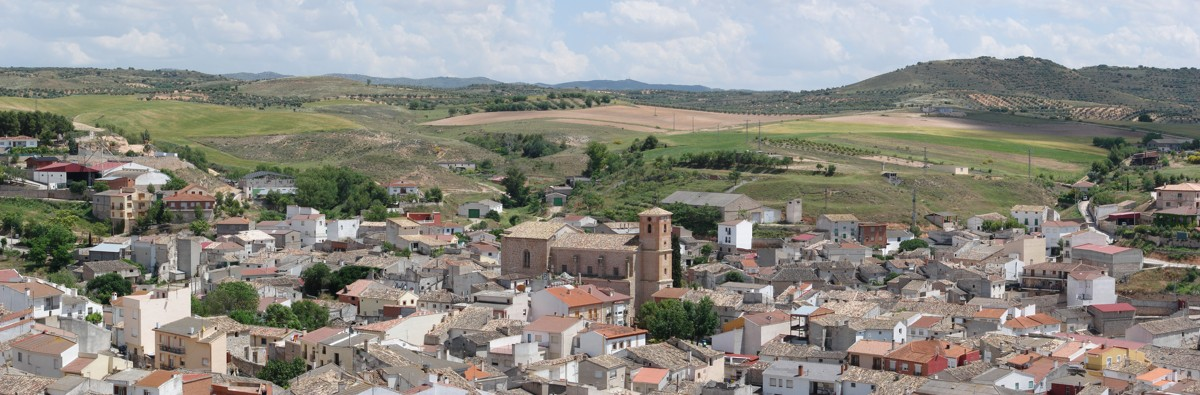

- Coat of arms

- Location within Province of Guadalajara Location within Castilla-La Mancha Location within Spain
- Country: Spain
- Autonomous community: Castile-La Mancha
- Province: Guadalajara
- Municipality: Illana

Government
  - Mayor: Franciso Javier Pérez del Saz (People's Party)
  - Deputy Mayor: Rafael Alonso Teruel

Population (2023)
  - Total: 878
- Time zone: UTC+1 (CET)
  - Summer (DST): UTC+2 (CEST)

Illana (Spanish pronunciation: [iˈʎana]) is a town and municipality in the province of Guadalajara, Spain, part of the autonomous community of Castile–La Mancha. It belongs to the natural region of La Alcarria.
