= Jean-Charles de Borda =

French scientist and Navy officer (1733–1799)

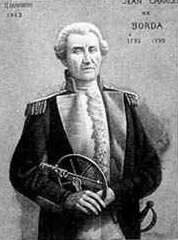
- Jean-Charles de Borda
- Born: 4 May 1733; Dax, France
- Died: 19 February 1799 (aged 65); Paris, France
- Known for: Borda count Borda-Carnot equation
- Scientific career
- Fields: Mathematics

Jean-Charles, chevalier de Borda (4 May 1733 – 19 February 1799) was a French mathematician, physicist, and Navy officer. He invented the Borda count system for elections, which served as basis to other voting systems. He is also known for the Borda–Carnot equation in fluid dynamics and his instruments to define the metre based on the arc measurement of Delambre and Méchain.

== Biography ==
=== Early years and education ===
Borda was born in the city of Dax to Jean‐Antoine de Borda and Jeanne‐Marie Thérèse de Lacroix. In 1756, Borda wrote Mémoire sur le mouvement des projectiles, a product of his work as a military engineer. For that, he was elected to the French Academy of Sciences in 1764.

=== American Revolutionary War ===
Borda was a mariner and a scientist, spending time in the Caribbean testing out advances in chronometers. Between 1777 and 1778, he participated in the American Revolutionary War. In 1781, he was put in charge of several vessels in the French Navy. In 1782, he was captured by the English, and was returned to France shortly after.

=== Hydraulic engineering ===
He returned as an engineer in the French Navy, making improvements to waterwheels and pumps. In 1766 he derived the losses in a water pipe due to sudden expansion, which is now described by the Borda–Carnot equation named after him.

He was appointed as France's Inspector of Naval Shipbuilding in 1784, and with the assistance of the naval architect Jacques-Noël Sané in 1786 introduced a massive construction programme to revitalise the French navy based on the standard designs of Sané.

== Research ==
In 1770, Borda formulated a ranked preferential voting system that is referred to as the Borda count. The French Academy of Sciences used Borda's method to elect its members for about two decades until it was quashed by Napoleon Bonaparte who insisted that his own method be used after he became president of the Académie in 1801. The Borda count is in use today in some academic institutions, competitions and several political jurisdictions. The Borda count has also served as a basis for other methods such as the Quota Borda system, Black's method and Nanson's method.

In 1778, he published his method of reducing lunar distance for computing the longitude, still regarded as the best of several similar mathematical procedures for navigation and position fixing in pre-chronometer days. They were used, for example, by Lewis and Clark to measure their latitude and longitude during their exploration of the North-western United States.

Another of his contributions is his construction of the standard metre, basis of the metric system to correspond to the arc measurement of Delambre and Méchain. As an instrument maker, he improved the reflecting circle (invented by Tobias Mayer) and the repeating circle (invented by his assistant, Etienne Lenoir), the latter used to measure the meridian arc from Dunkirk to Barcelona by Jean Baptiste Joseph Delambre and Pierre Méchain.

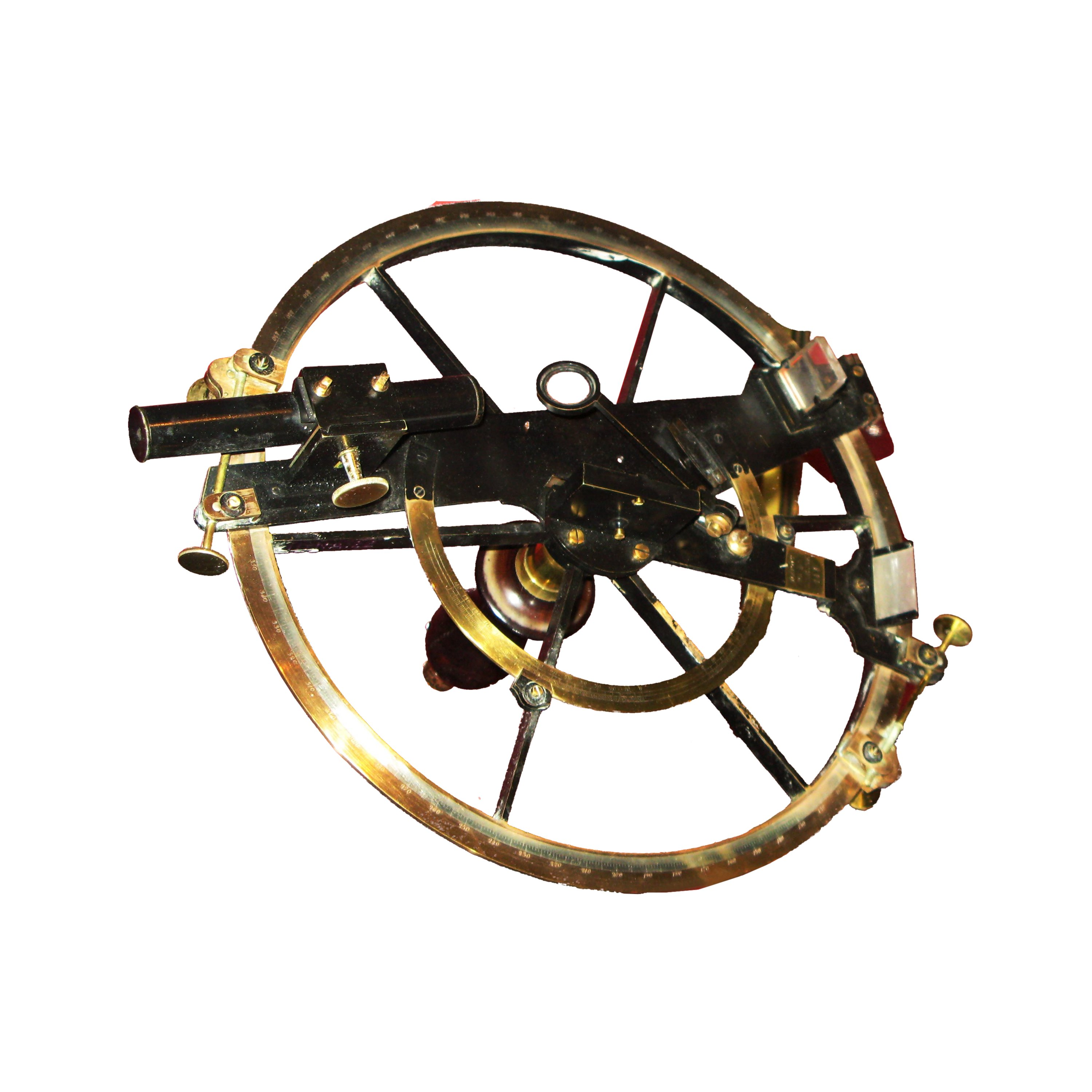
Reflecting circle, on display at Toulon naval museum

=== Tables of logarithms ===
With the advent of the metric system, after the French Revolution it was decided that the quarter circle should be divided into 100 angular units, currently known as the gradian, instead of 90 degrees, and the gradian into 100 centesimal minutes of arc (centigrades) instead of 60 arc-minutes. This required the calculation of trigonometric tables and logarithms corresponding to the new unit and instruments for measuring angles in the new system.

Borda constructed instruments for measuring angles in the new units (the instrument could no longer be called a "sextant") which was later used in the arc measurement of the meridian between Dunkirk and Barcelona by Delambre to determine the radius of the Earth and thus define the length of the metre. The tables of logarithms of sines, secants, and tangents were also required for the purposes of navigation. Borda was an enthusiast for the metric system and constructed tables of these logarithms starting in 1792 but their publication was delayed until after his death and only published in the Year IX (1801) as Tables of Logarithms of sines, secants, and tangents, co-secants, co-sines, and co-tangents for the Quarter of the Circle divided into 100 degrees, the degree into 100 minutes, and the minute into 100 seconds to ten decimals, and including his tables of logarithms to 7 decimals from 10,000 to 100,000 with tables for obtaining results to 10 decimals.

The division of the degree into hundredths was accompanied by the division of the day into 10 hours of 100 minutes (decimal time) and maps were required to show the new degrees of latitude and longitude. The Republican Calendar was abolished by Napoleon in 1806, but the 400-unit circle lived on as the gradian.

== Honours ==
- Six French ships have been named Borda in his honour.
- The crater Borda on the Moon is named after him.
- Asteroid 175726 has been called Borda in his honour.
- His name is one of the 72 names inscribed on the Eiffel Tower.
- Cape Borda on the northwest coast of Kangaroo Island in South Australia is named in his honour.
- Île Borda was the name given to Kangaroo Island in his honour by Nicholas Baudin.
- Borda Rock in Antarctica is named after Jean-Charles de Borda.

== Publications ==
- Rapport sur le choix d'une unité de mesure, lu à l'Academie des sciences le 19 mars 1791 / imprimé par ordre de l'Assemblée nationale. With Marquis de Condorcet.
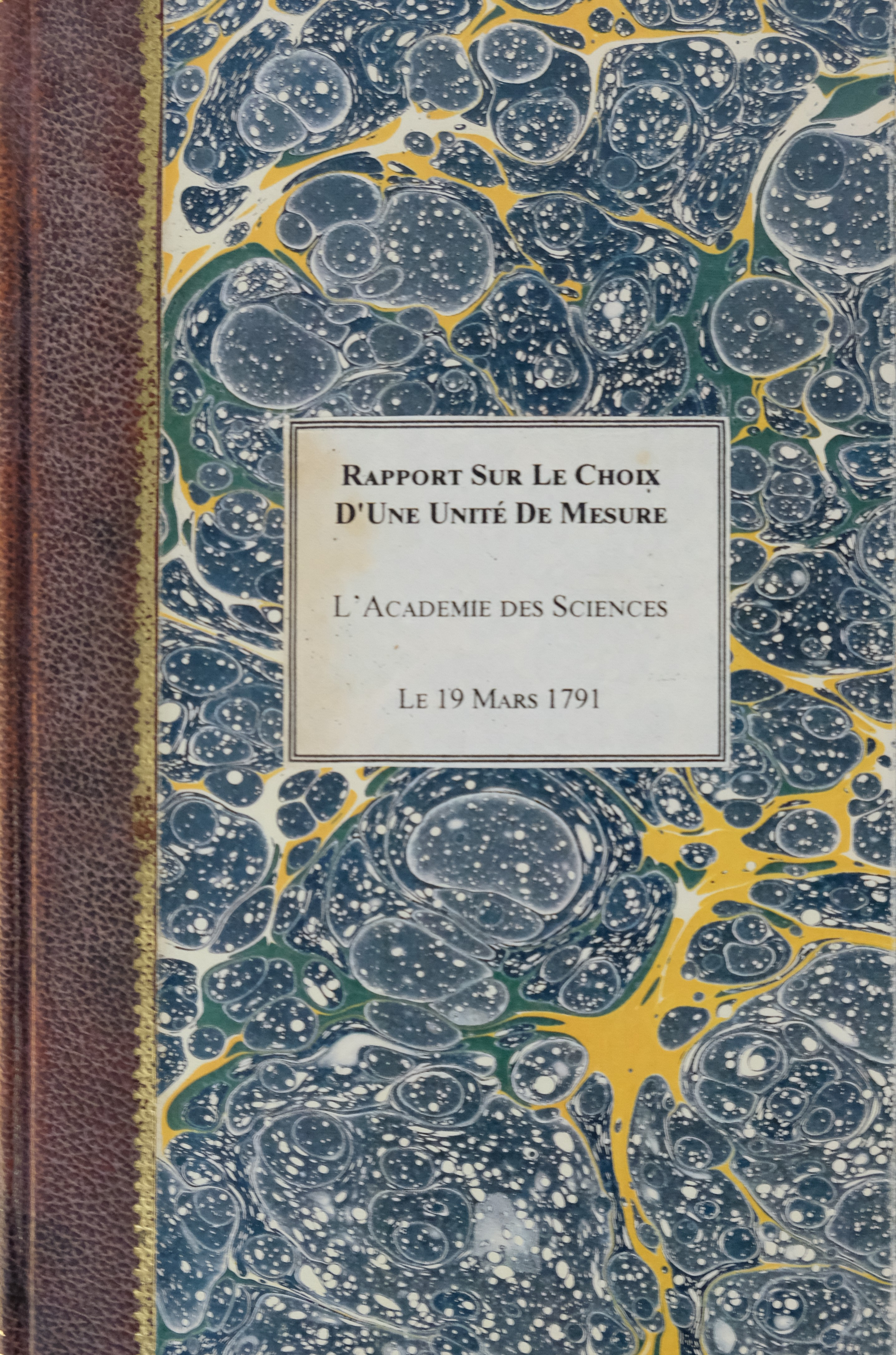
Cover page of a 1791 copy of "Rapport sur le choix d'une unité de mesure" by Borda and the Marquis de Condorcet

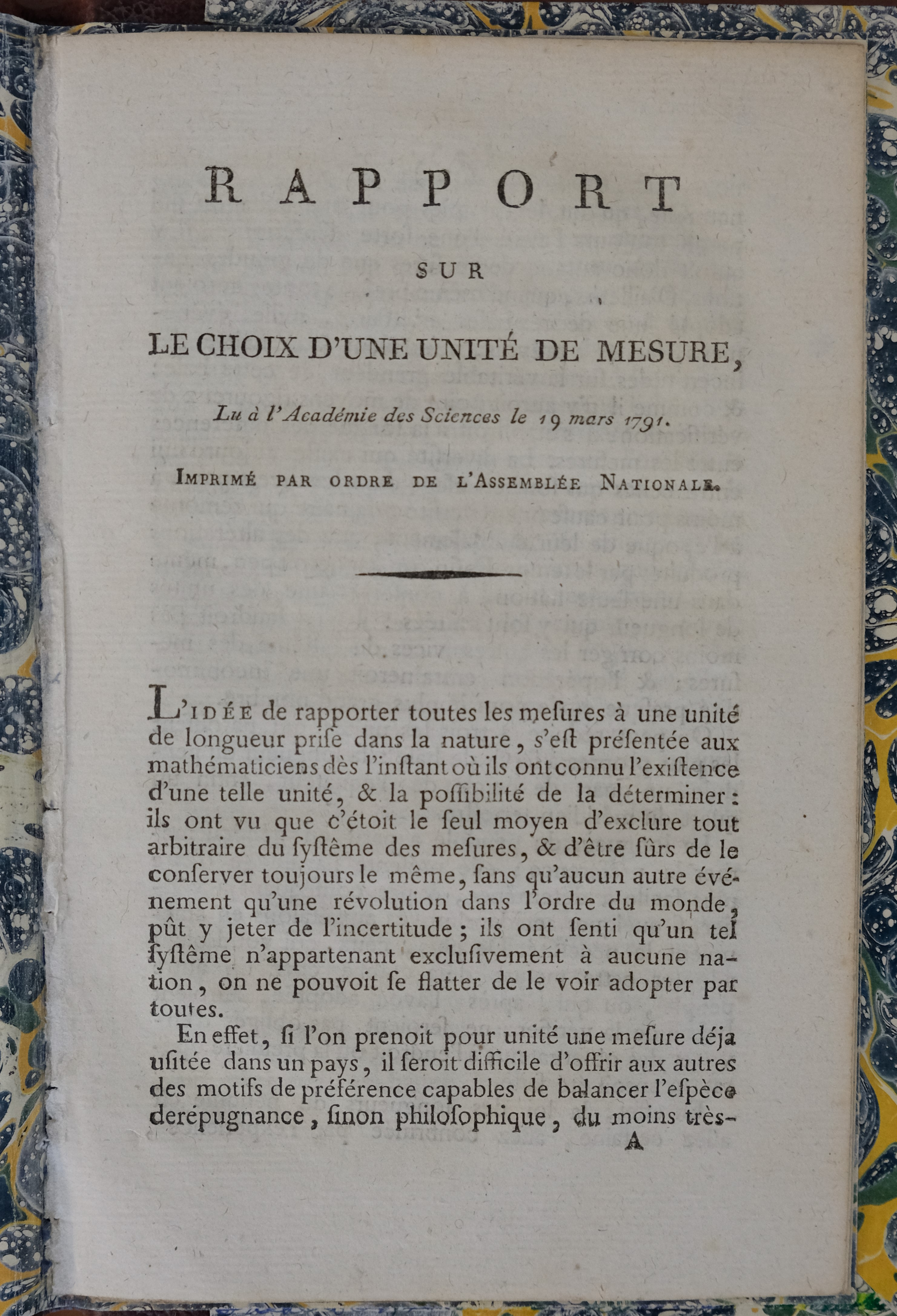
Page one of a 1791 copy of "Rapport sur le choix d'une unité de mesure" by Borda and the Marquis de Condorcet

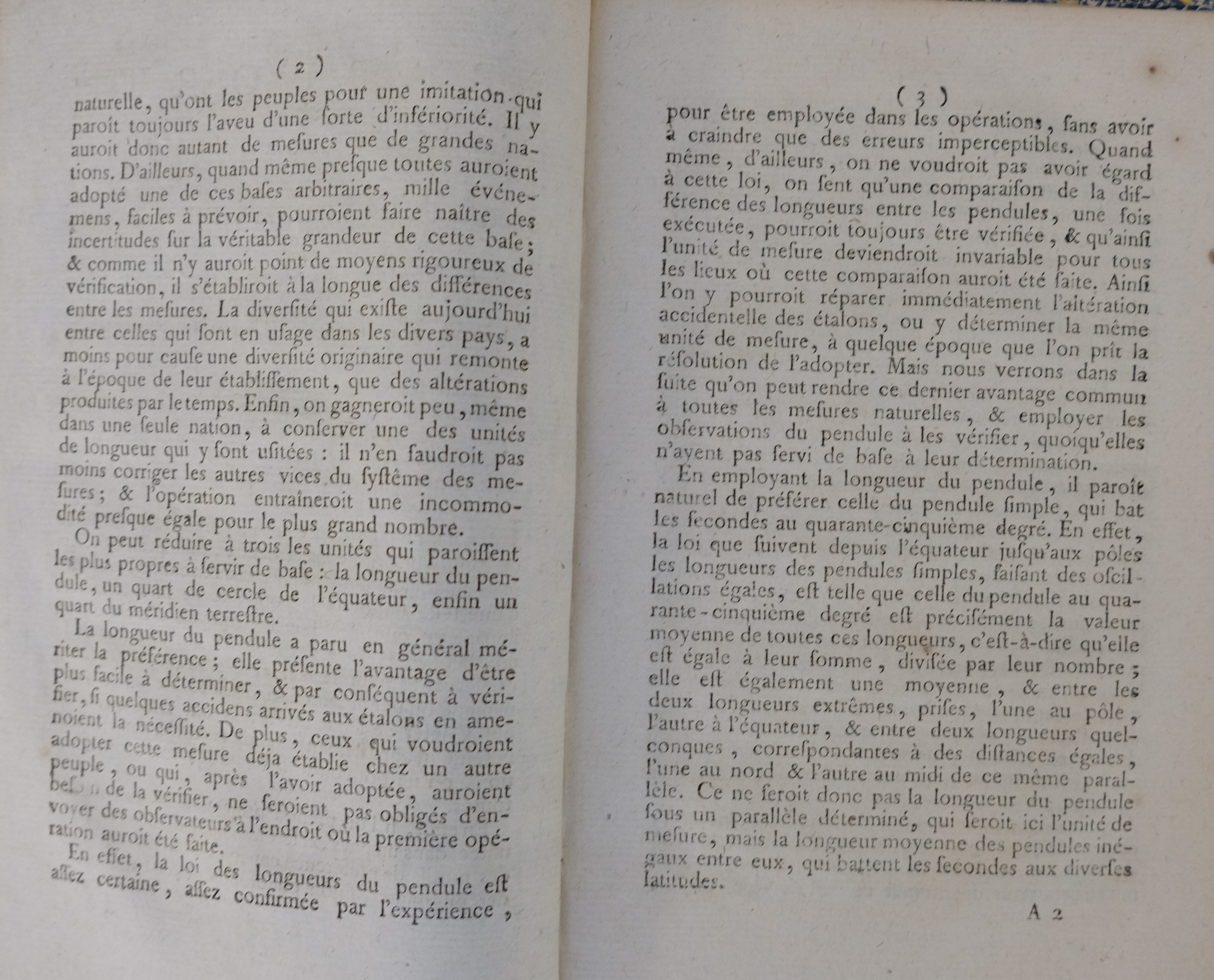
Pages 2–3

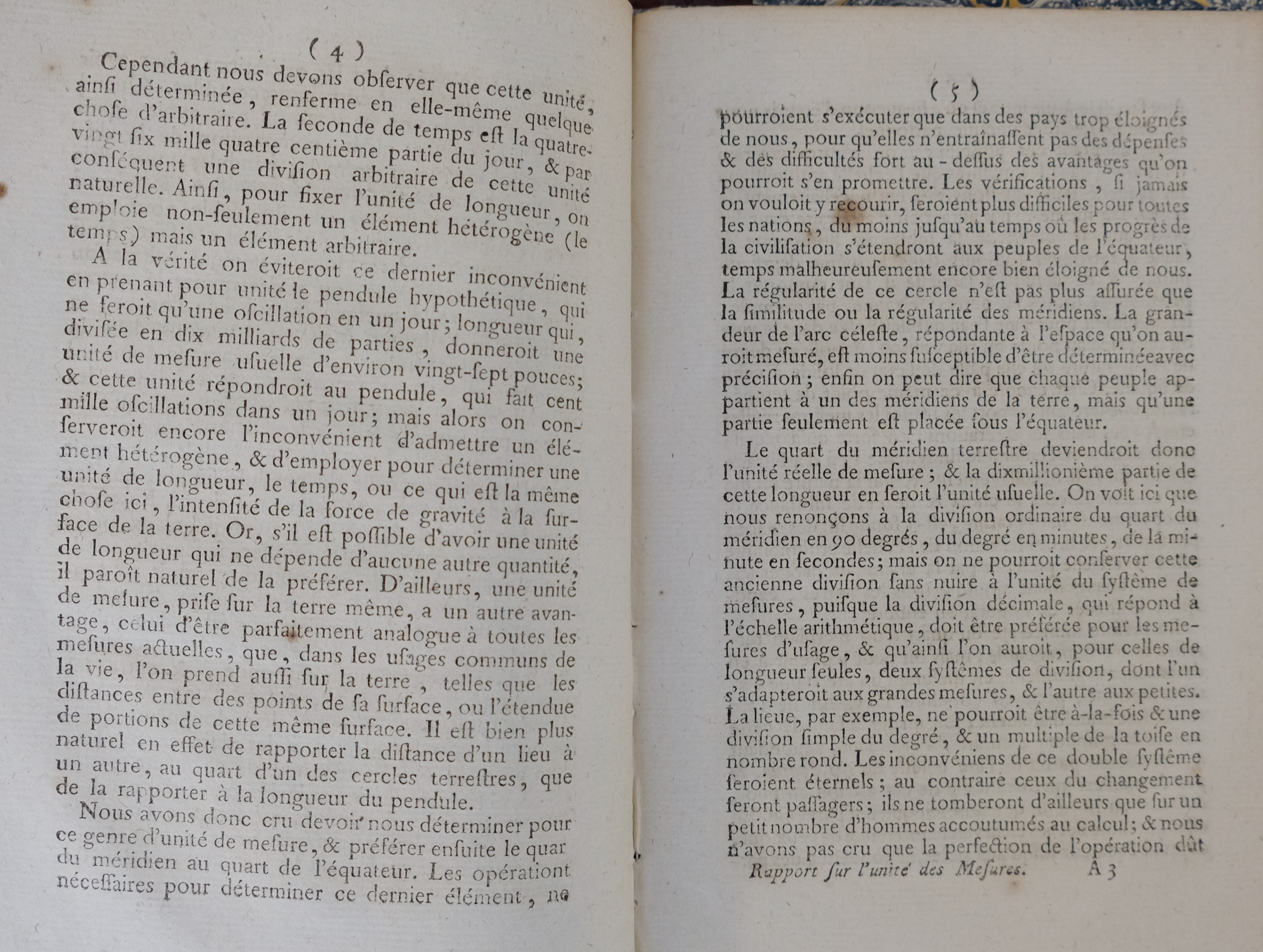
Pages 4–5

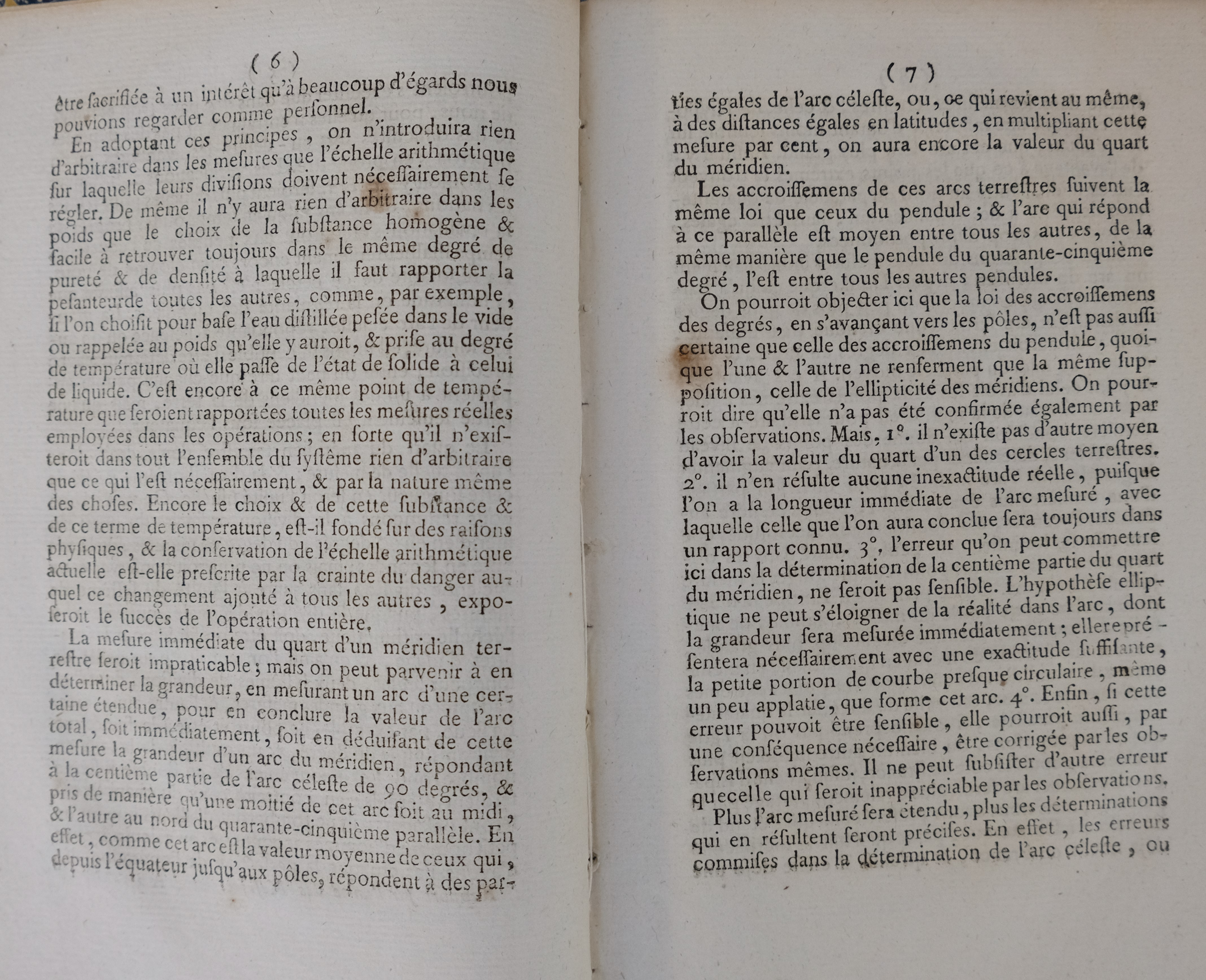
Pages 6–7

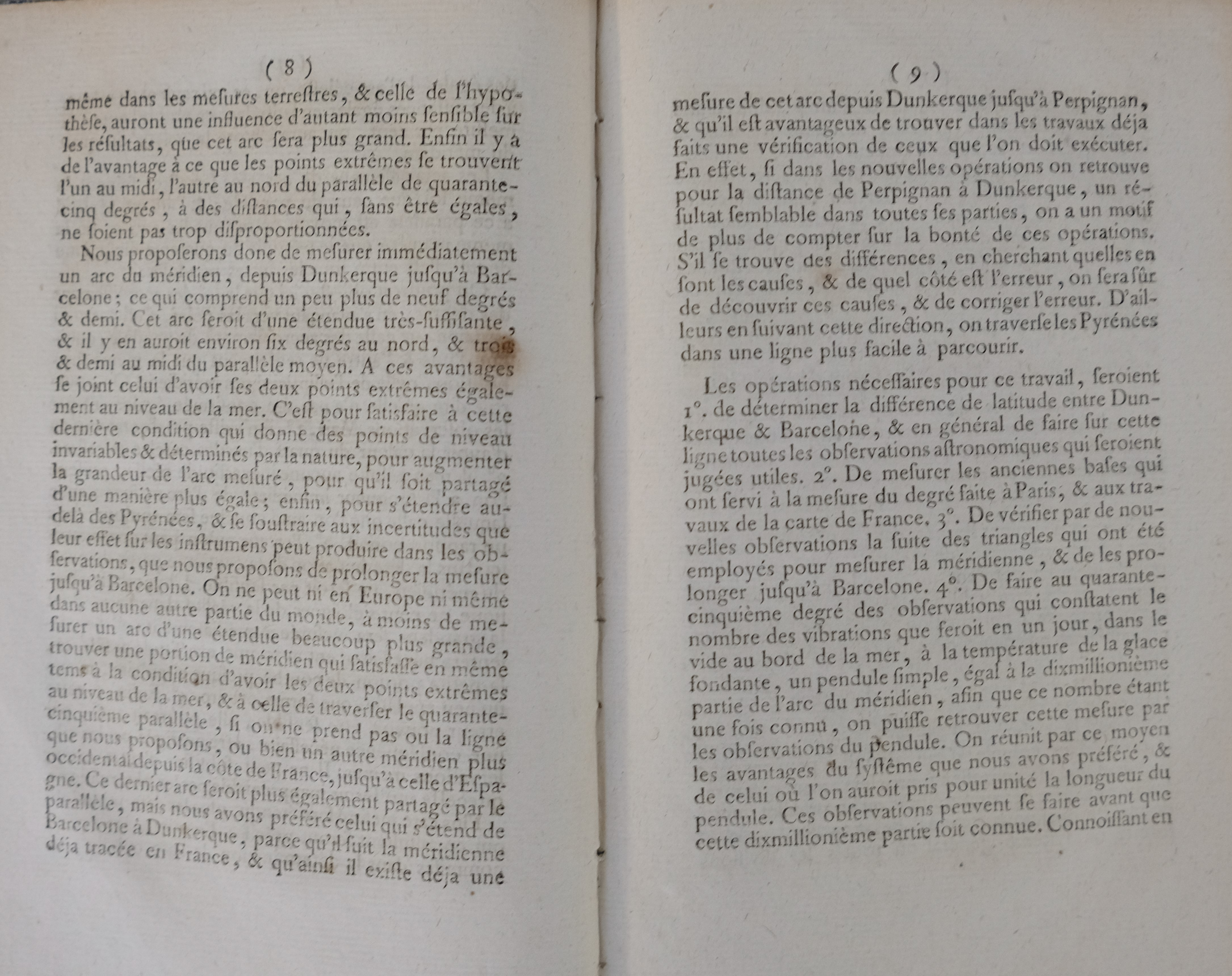
Pages 8–9

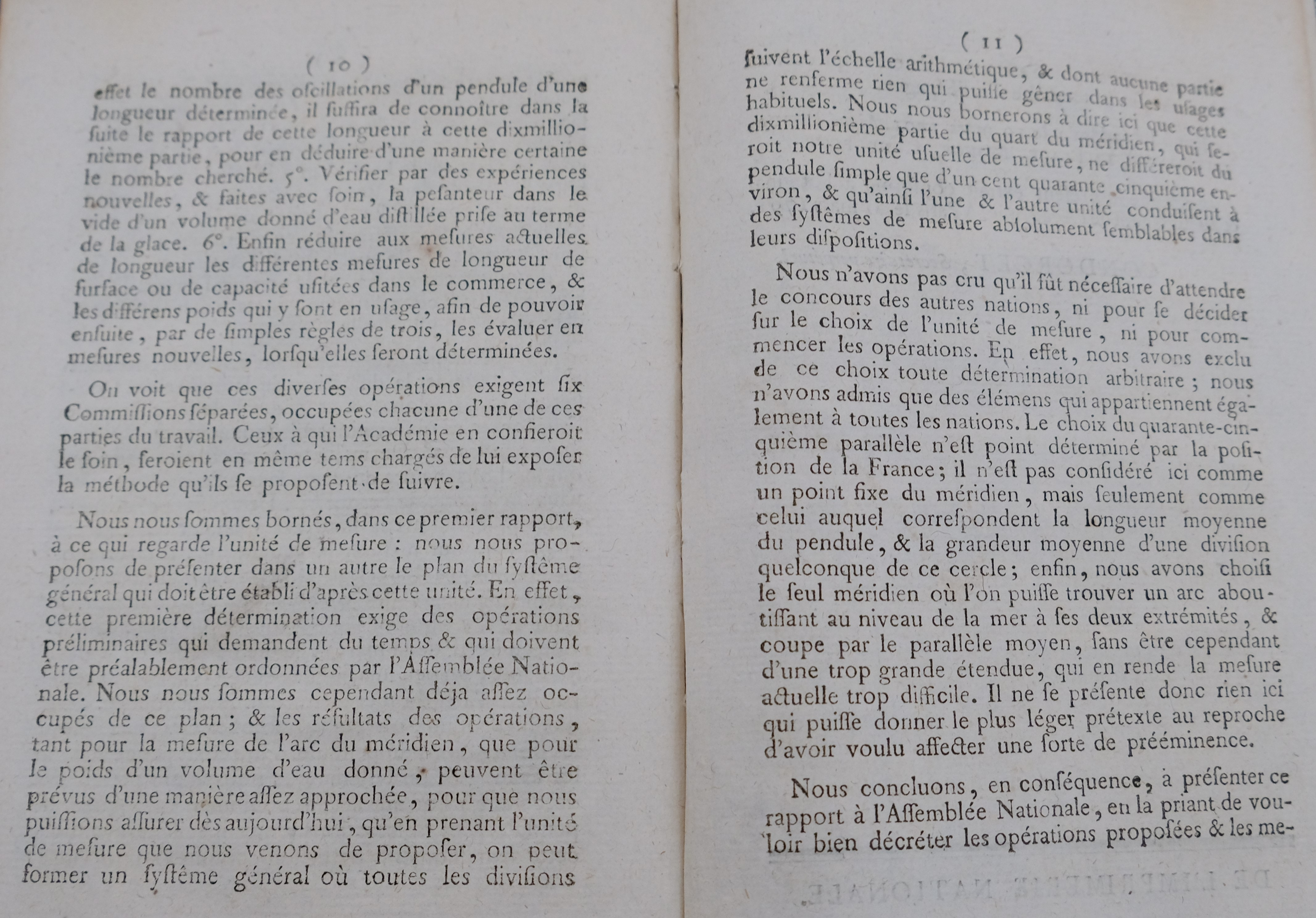
Pages 10–11

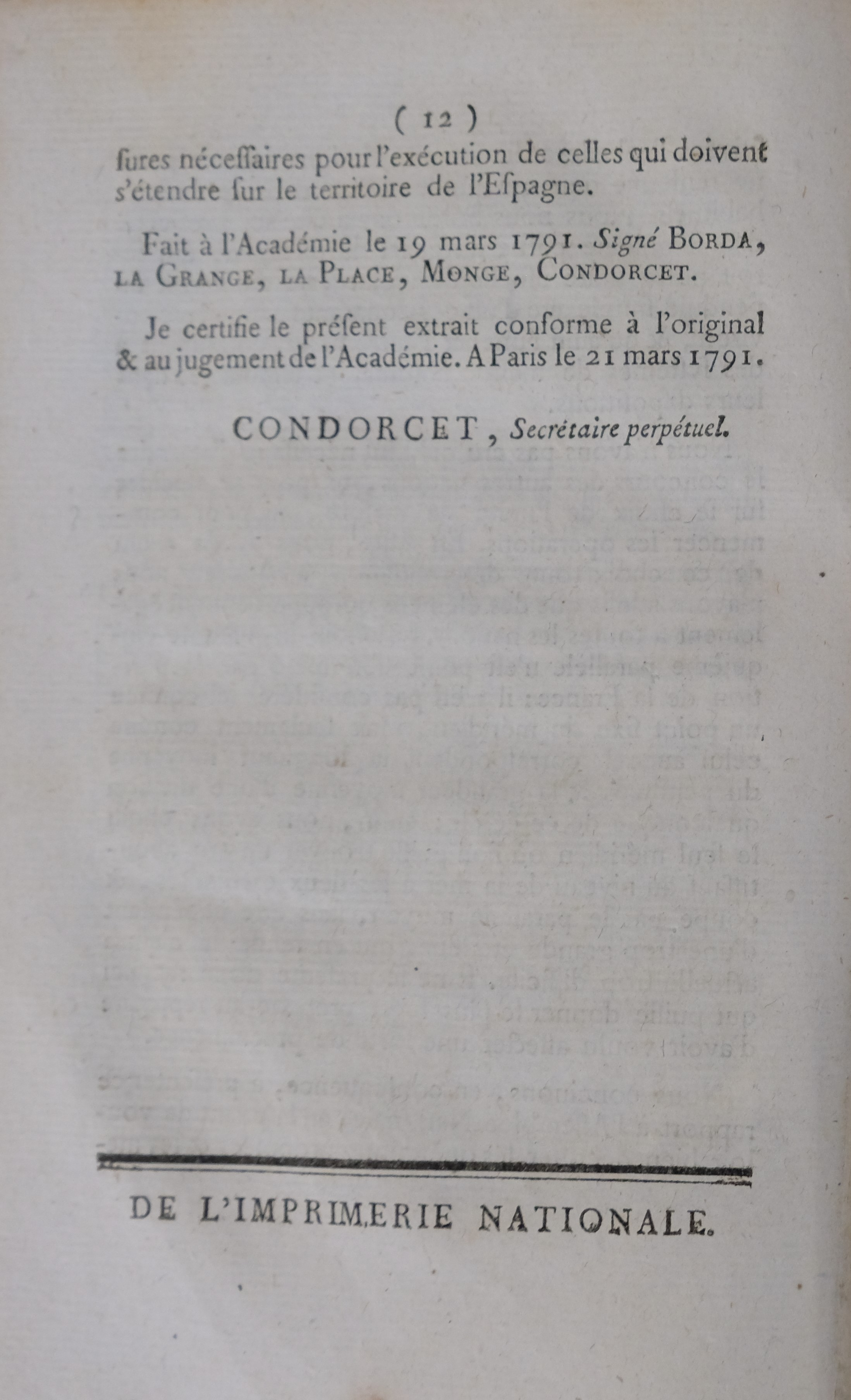
Final page of a 1791 copy of "Rapport sur le choix d'une unité de mesure" by Borda and the [[Marquis de Condorcet]]

== See also ==
- Borda–Carnot equation
- Carlos Ibáñez e Ibáñez de Ibero – 1st president of the International Committee for Weights and Measures and president of the International Geodetic Association
