= Monastery of Santa Catalina de Siena, Arequipa =

Monastery in Arequipa, Peru

Monastery of Santa Catalina de Siena
- Monasterio de Santa Catalina de Siena
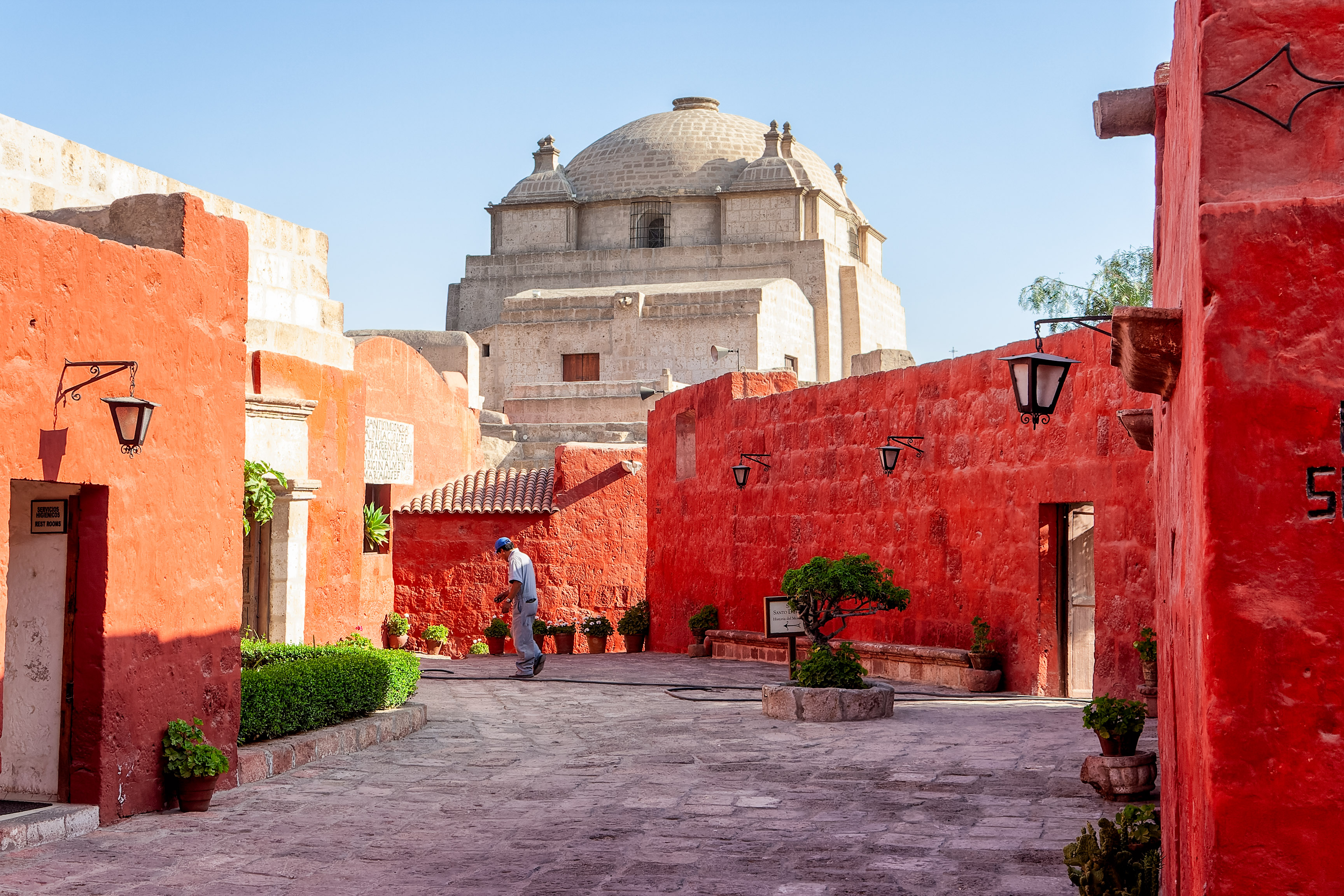
- Courtyard within the monastery complex

- Location in Arequipa

Religion
- Affiliation: Roman Catholic
- Rite: Latin Rite
- Leadership: Dominican Order
- Year consecrated: 1579
- Status: Active (partly cloistered monastery; partly museum)

Location
- Location: Arequipa, Peru
- Coordinates: 16°23′42″S 71°32′12″W

Architecture
- Type: Monastery
- Style: Colonial, Mestizo Baroque, Neoclassical
- Founder: Doña María de Guzmán
- Completed: 1580s (expanded until the 18th century)
- Materials: Sillar

Website
- santacatalina.org.pe

Cultural Heritage of Peru
- Official name: Iglesia y Convento de Santa Catalina
- Type: Immovable tangible
- Criteria: Monument
- Designated: 2 October 1944; 81 years ago
- Legal basis: R.S. Nº 3108

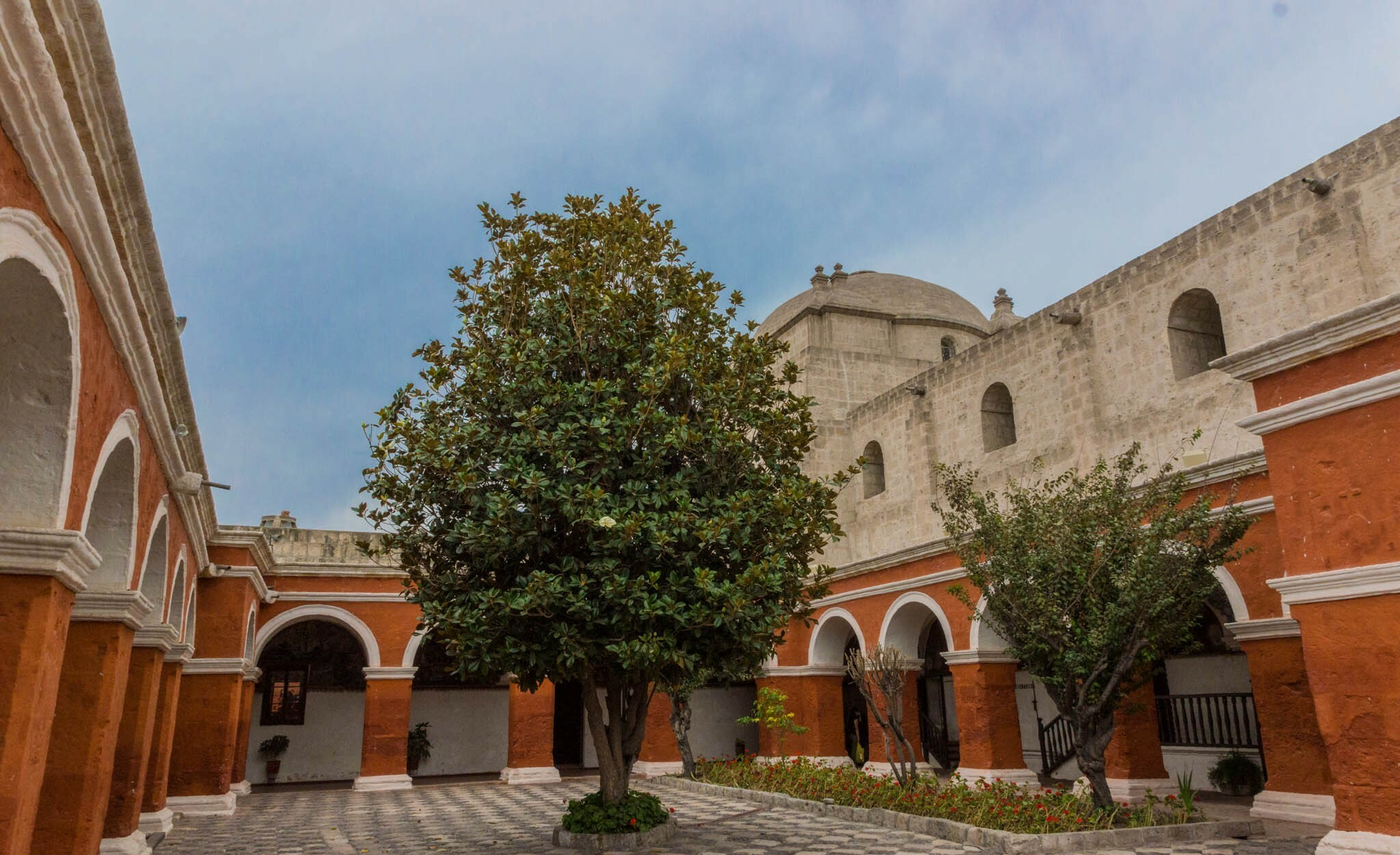
The Major cloister of Santa Catalina Monastery.

The Monastery of Santa Catalina de Siena is a large monastery of the Dominican Second Order, located in Arequipa, Peru. It was consecrated in 1579 and is part of the UNESCO World Heritage Site "Historical Centre of the City of Arequipa".

== Location ==
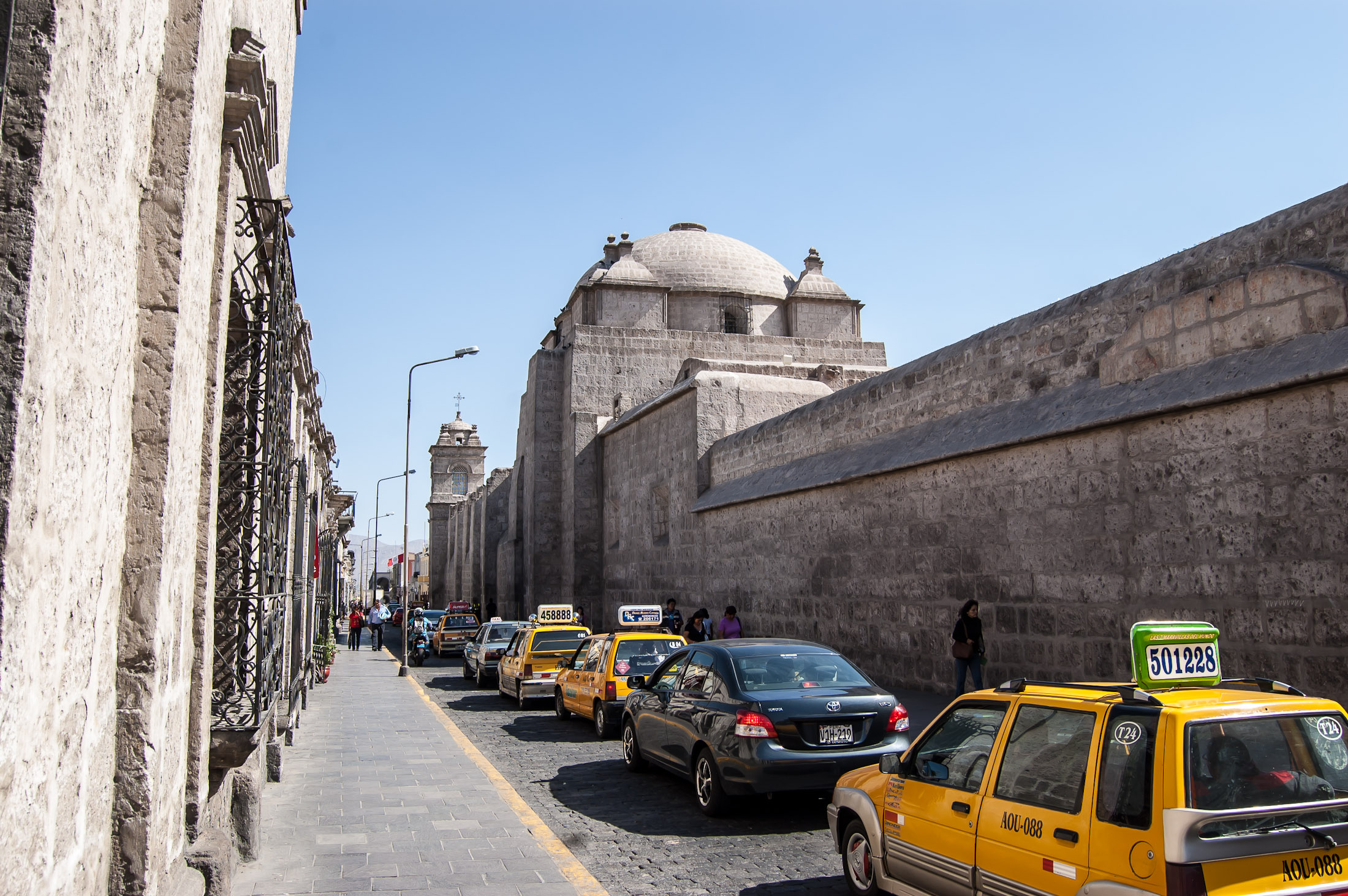
Exterior wall of the Monastery of Santa Catalina.

The citadel was located in the south of Peru in the city of Arequipa, founded on September 10, 1579, and located in an area that stands out for its natural beauty, welcoming climate and that has a great material with which the architecture of this city is built and continues to be built, the tuff. In the monastery there are two types, the white tuff, which comes from the Chachani volcano, and the pink one from the Misti, the latter emblem of the city.

The citadel occupies an area of 20,000 square meters, "it constitutes a true and small city, characterized by its multitude of streets, somewhat tortuous, broken and narrow." And is completely isolated from the city, despite being located in the heart of it. A great and solid wall of 4 meters of height isolated the life of the women who inhabited the monastery.

== Historical review ==
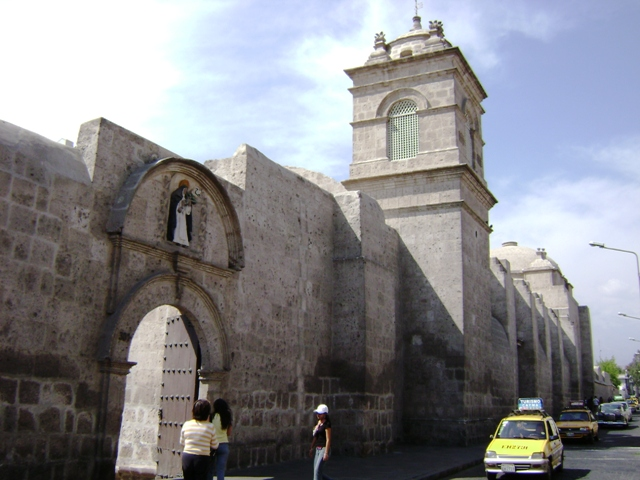
Portal and church of the monastery

Viceroy Francisco de Toledo grants the necessary license for the foundation of the much-desired monastery that applied for citizenship. Doña María de Guzmán, widow of Diego Hernández de Mendoza, decides to seclude herself in the monastery under construction, giving up all her assets. On September 10, 1579, the memory of the foundation of the monastery was made, signed by the Cabildo, the city regiment and the bishopric of Cusco, naming María de Guzmán as the "First settler and prioress of said Monastery". On October 2, 1580, date on which the first monastery was completed, a high mass is held in the city so that from that day the habits will be taken.

Its first facilities were destroyed in 1600 and 1604 by earthquakes, but after these the community of Santa Catalina experienced a definitive rebirth, thanks to the entry of many catalinas of high lineage, from rich Arequipa families of that time, its current building corresponds to the last third of the 17th century.

The women who entered the monastery as nuns were white criollas and mestizas belonging to wealthy families. The story tells of the income of the so-called "poor nuns" who, without having money to pay a dowry, entered to exercise their virtues. It is known that, in the middle of the 18th century, the citadel had more than 300 women in habit and servant maids.

On June 13, 1747, a group of four nuns from the Santa Catalina Monastery moved to the newly built Santa Rosa Monastery, located on the corner of San Pedro and Santa Rosa streets, to found a new religious community, which continues there until now.

The Santa Catalina Monastery was wrapped in a veil of mystery and silence until 1970, when a large part of the convent opened its doors to the public. The nuns allowed a private company to manage it. Nuns still live in the northern area of the complex.

== Architecture ==
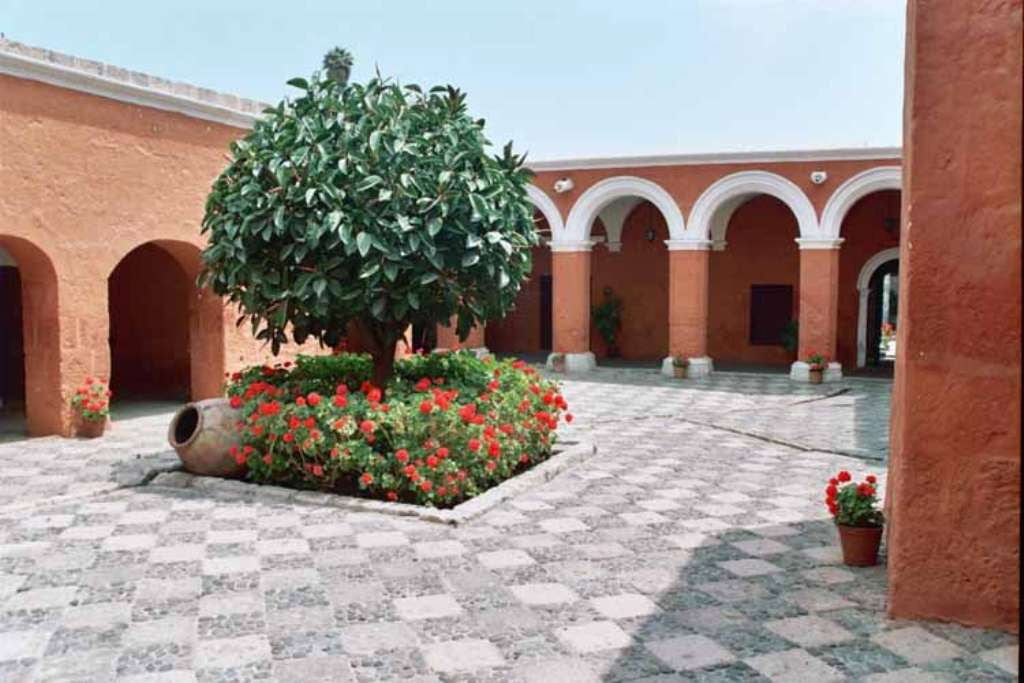
Courtyard del Silencio.

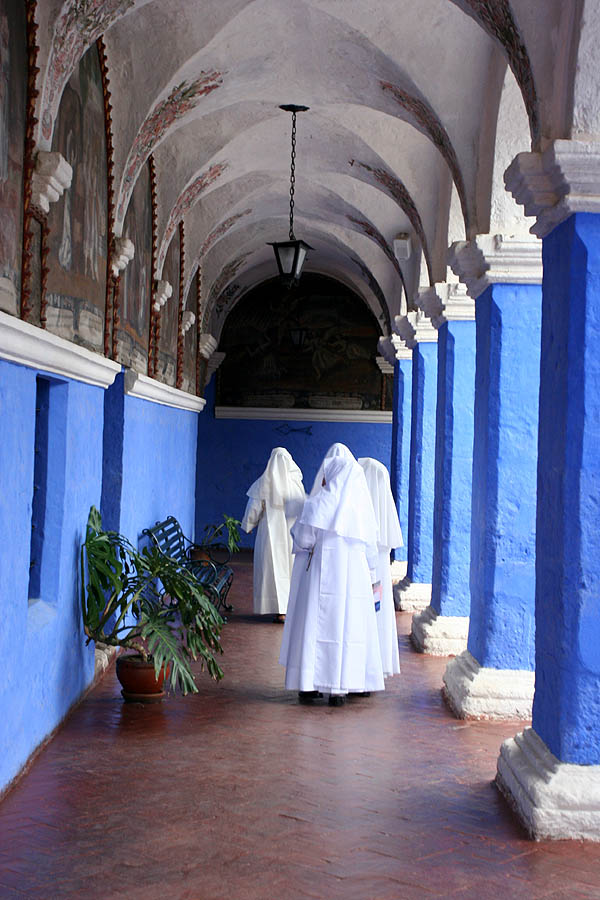
Cloister de los Naranjos

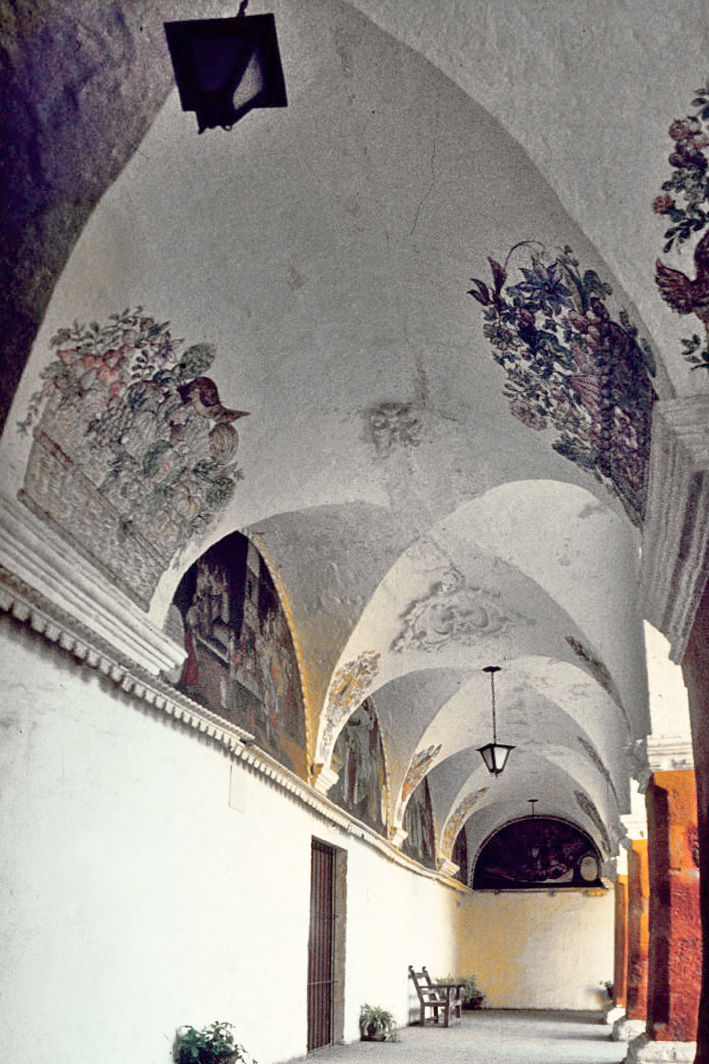
Major cloister

The charm of this citadel lies in the solidity and plasticity of its volumes, and the beauty that master builders achieved in the architecture of these enclosures through solutions such as flying buttresses or the construction of strong arches based on pillars.

In the interiors, domes and vaulted ceilings greatly expand the space and add to the sense of strength of the buildings. Likewise, especially in the area of the alleys, the intervention of masons who, lacking a proper architectural design, were raising walls, roofs, cells, patios and portals of a simple approach is perceived.

The current building houses splendid pieces of art, such as a Baroque altar of carved and gilt wood, with one body and three lanes, which adorns the chapel, and several paintings from the Cusco School.

Due to the constant earthquakes that affected the monastery, the families of the nuns chose to build unique and private cells for each one of them. What caused there to be ordered sectors and in the absence of a plan others with a notorious disorder. For almost two centuries during the colony, the cloisters and cells of the monastery have undergone various modifications, additions and new constructions that have made Santa Catalina a counter on a human scale of Arequipa's colonial architecture.

== Dependencies ==
The small streets and cloisters are full of colorful flowers and the walls are painted in fresh dyes. Narrow alleys lead to the various parts of the convent passing through picturesque sites and living and sleeping places with the original furniture.

- Portal of the monastery

The entrance portal is adorned with a relief of St. Catherine of Siena, under whose patronage the monastery was founded. It is carved into the solid tuff wall that borders the entire block. The sober simplicity of shapes and color of this cover contrasts with the cheerful color that the visitor will find in the interior environments.

- Courtyard del Silencio

It was the place where the nuns gathered to pray the Holy Rosary and read the Bible in complete silence.

- Cloister de los Naranjos

It dates from 1738. It owes its name to the presence of orange trees. The three crosses located in the middle of the cloister are part of a tradition of the Santa Catalina Monastery, where the nuns represent the Passion of Christ every Good Friday.

- Major Cloister

Built between 1715 and 1723, it is the largest cloister in the Monastery. On the left side there are 5 confessionals that had the required privacy. Around it are located paintings intended for the preparation, teaching and catechization of nuns, as in the other two cloisters. There are a total of 32 colonial paintings, 23 refer to the life of Mary and 9 to the public life of Jesus.

- Kitchen

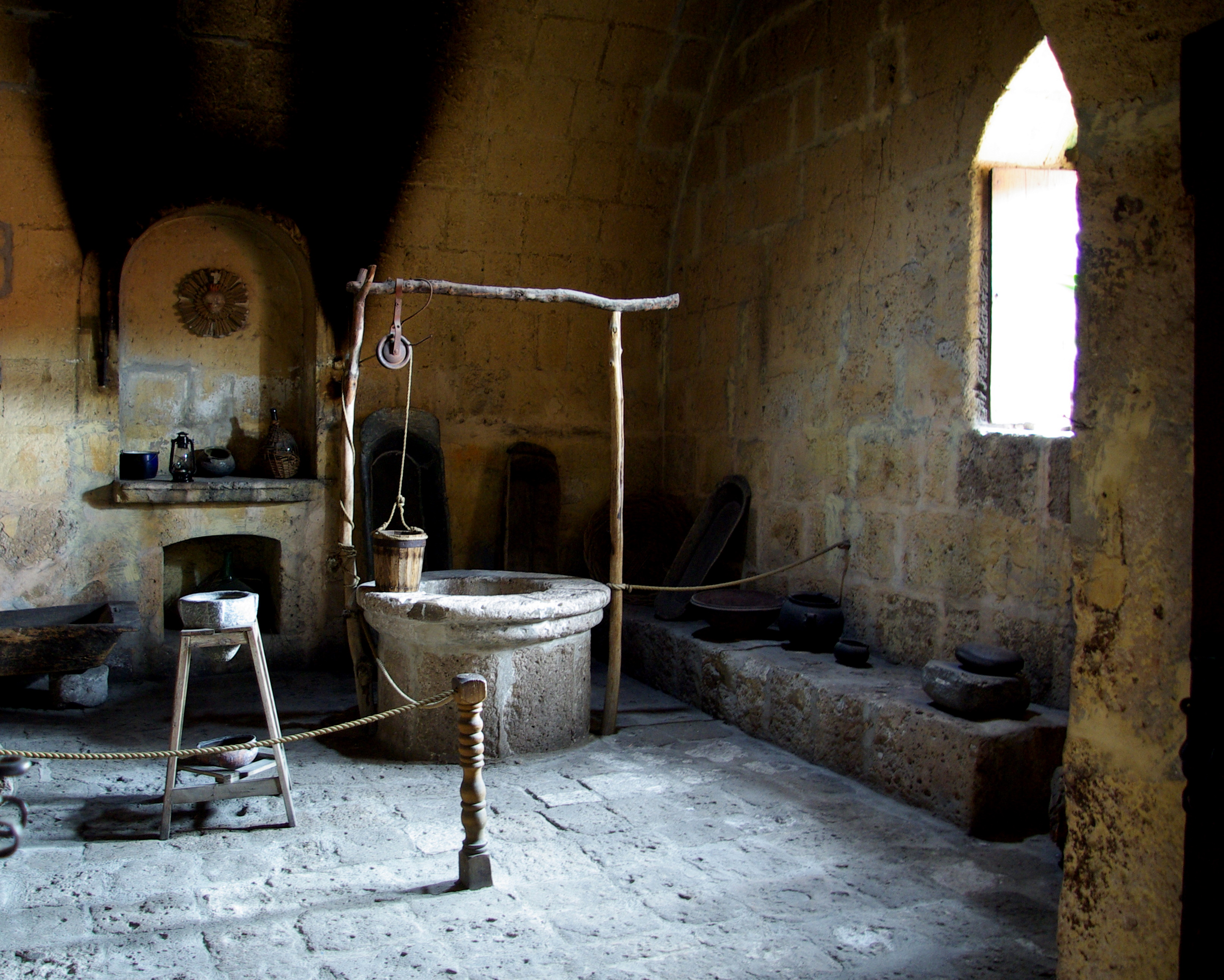
A preserved historical kitchen in the monastery.

This kitchen draws a lot of attention for the particularity of its environment that takes us back centuries. Some experts believe that its high domed ceiling was due to the fact that it was or was going to be used as a chapel. The kitchen worked with coal, firewood and other fuels, that is why all the walls are blackened and the utensils that can be seen in it are original from that time.

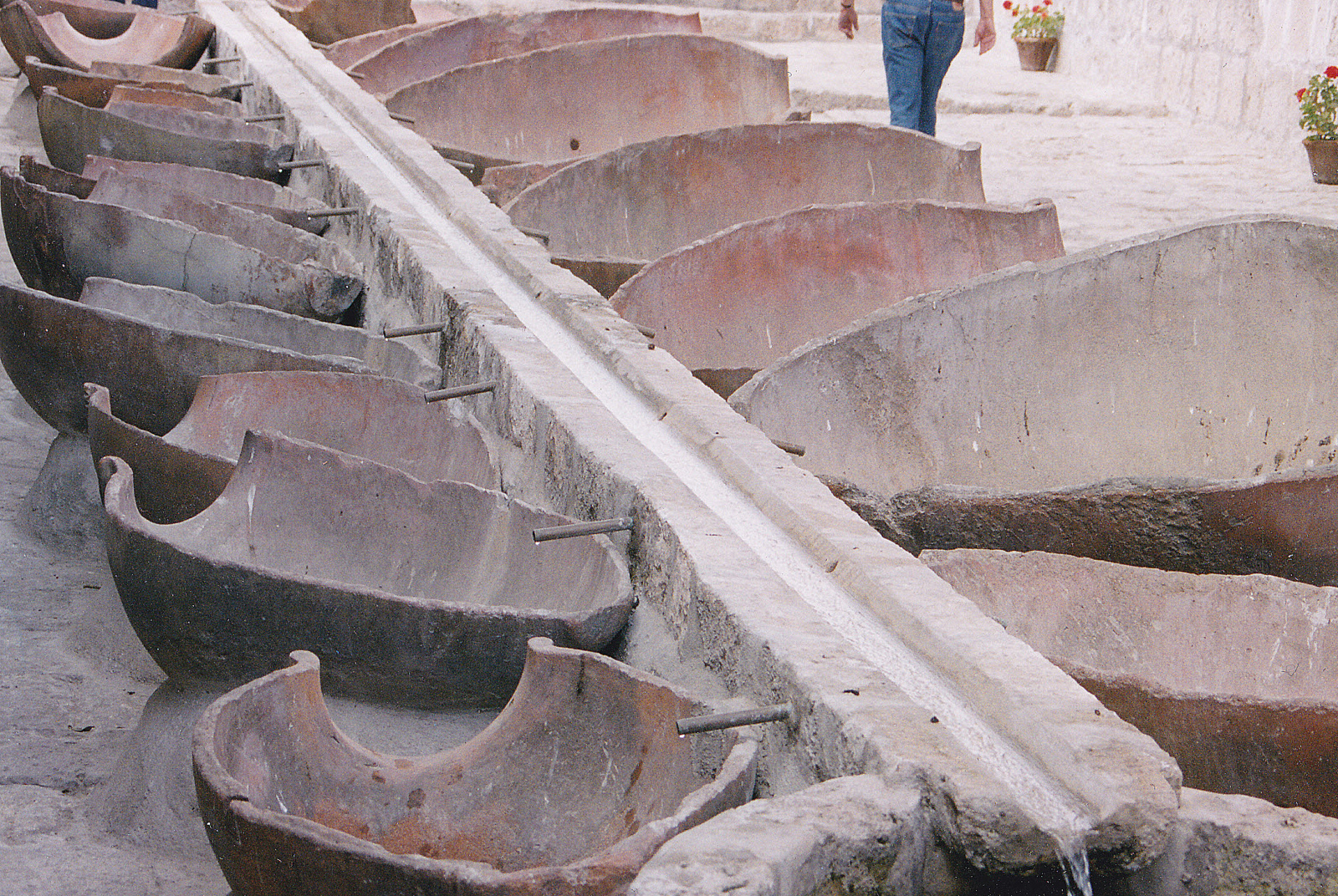
Laundry

- Laundry

It was built in 1770, when Arequipa was supplied with water through ditches. In it we find 20 half urns, which are large clay containers, used in the past to store grains, corn or wine, which served as trays. The water ran through a central channel, which was diverted to each jar by placing a stone and at the bottom of the tray they put a plug, which after washing was removed and the water ran towards the underground channel that carried the waste to the river.

- Bell tower

The distinguished tower that the Monastery of Santa Catalina boasts was built in 1748 with the President of the Council, the superior Sister Catalina de San José Barreda and Bishop Juan Bravo de Rivero. Its bell tower has four bells arranged facing the streets that surround the monastery:
- Facing Santa Catalina street (to the east), an old bell without any inscription.
- Facing Ugarte Street (to the south) is the oldest bell with the inscription "Santa Catalina Ora Pronobis, 1749".
- Facing Bolívar Street (to the west) there is a bell with the inscription “R.M. María de Villegas, 1787”.

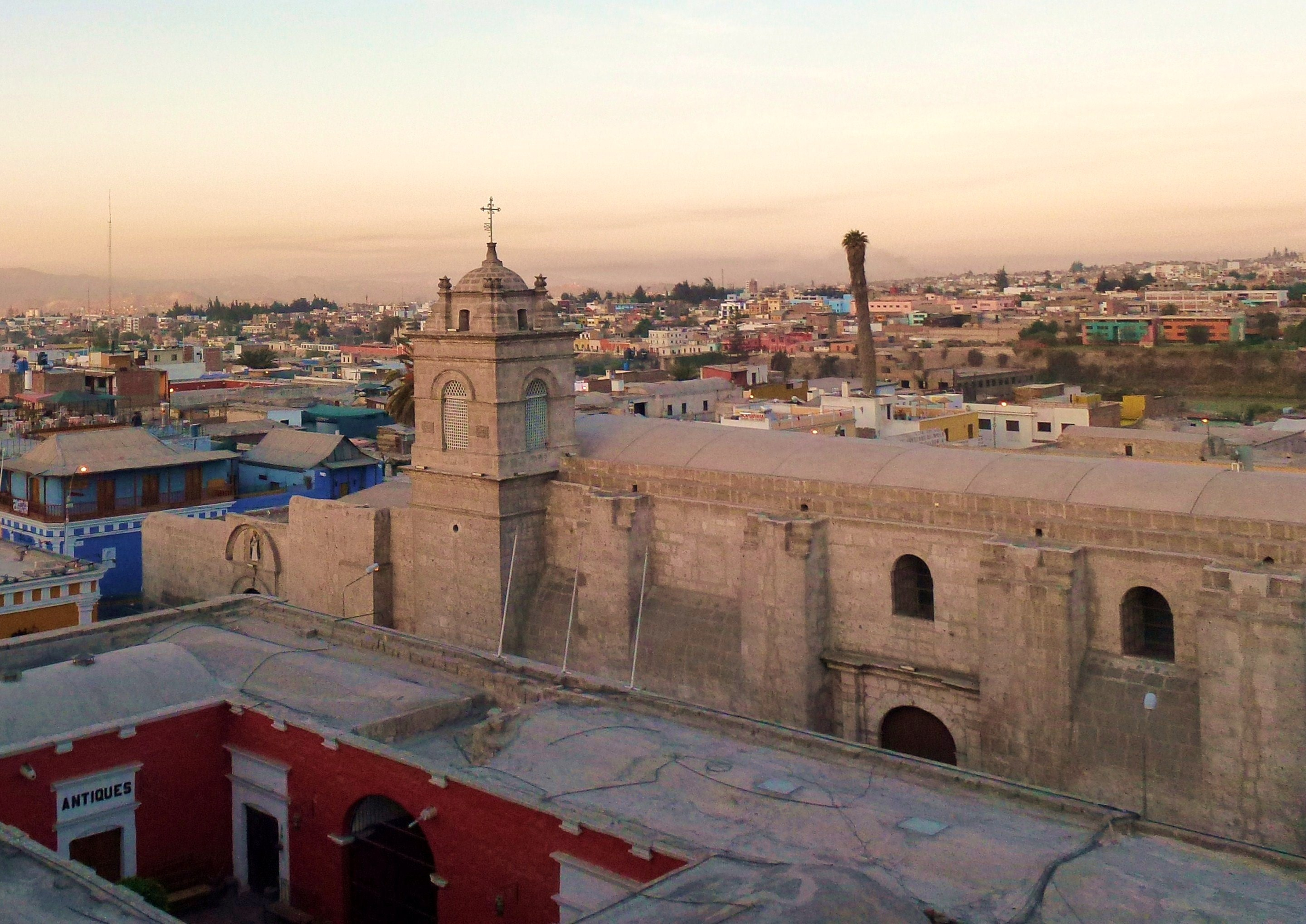
Iglesia.

- Church

Beautiful and old church with a long nave and a semicircular dome, which has a basic floor plan construction of approximately 1660.

Its main altar is made of embossed silver that represents a very careful work, with beautiful and delicate religious motifs, by the old craftsmen who were entrusted with the work. In it we find interesting rooms for the confessors of the nuns who were in closure. Likewise, there is a beautiful altar dedicated to Blessed Sister Ana of the Angels Monteagudo. There is a large metal fence between the church and the lower choir, which is where the nuns were located and continue to do so for the celebration of Holy Mass, to separate the enclosure from the outside world. In the upper part is the high choir where there is a large and ancient European organ of beautiful manufacture.

Inside you can see the cloister of Blessed Sister Ana of the Angels Monteagudo, who was beatified due to her exemplary conventual life and the attribution of some miracles.

== Art gallery of the monastery ==
Approximately 400 colonial art pieces. The main works are exhibited in a majestic setting: two immense rooms with high vaults, arranged in a cross, in which the stucco has been removed, leaving the walls in ashlar. To the side another smaller vault completes the architectural unit dedicated to the museum.

== In culture ==
The Santa Catalina monastery features in some detail in the second half of The Book of Human Skin by Michele Lovric.

Patrick Leigh Fermor visited the monastery on 27 August 1971, and wrote of his impressions in the third of his Three Letters from the Andes (1991).

== Gallery ==
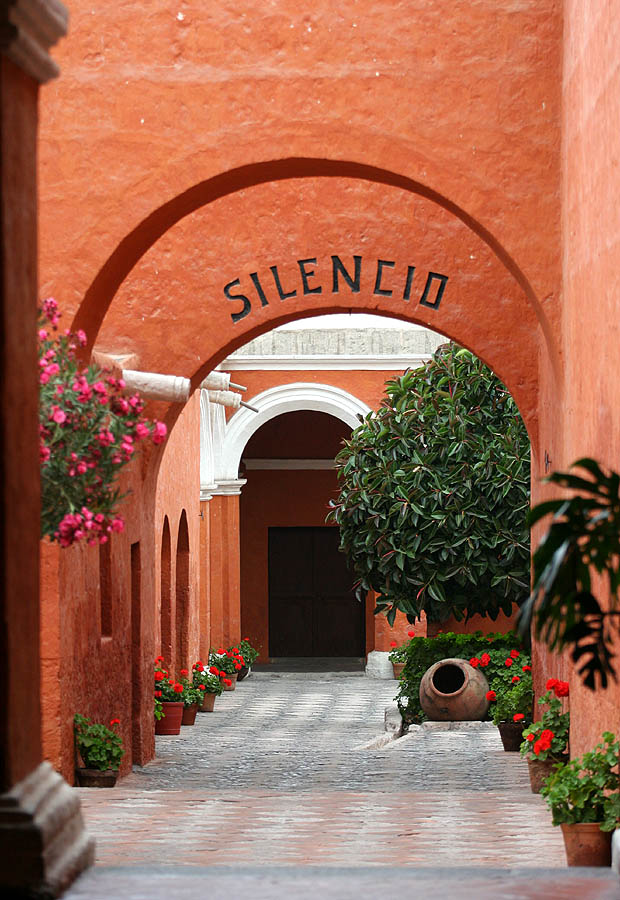
One of the many alleys within the monastery.

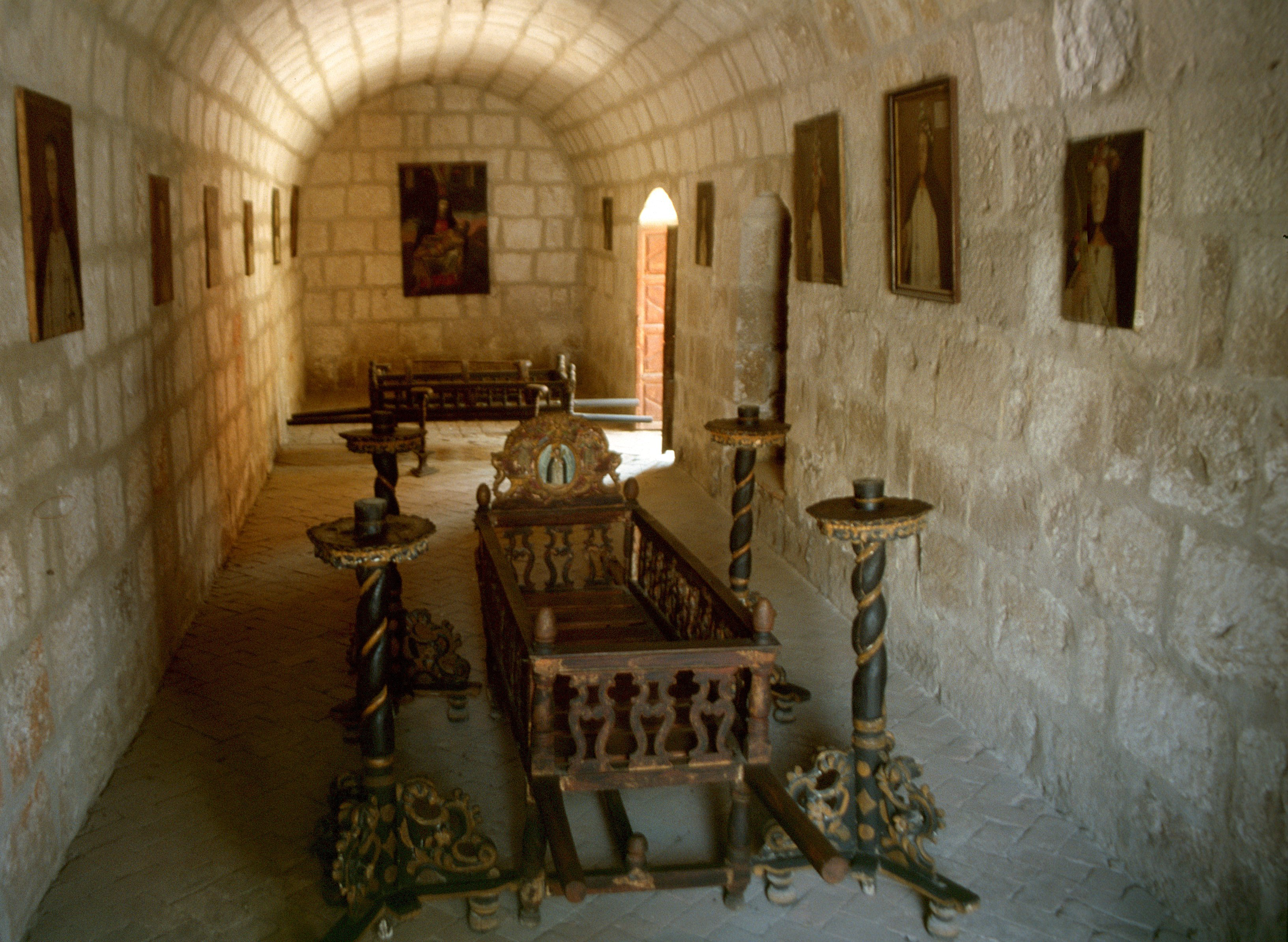
Convent of Santa Catalina.

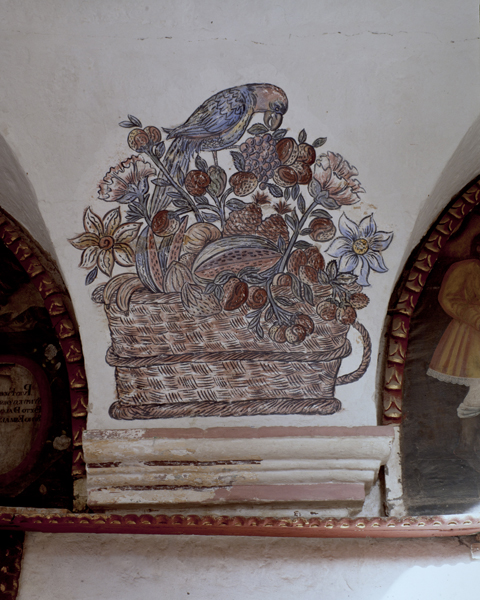
Detail of the Major cloister

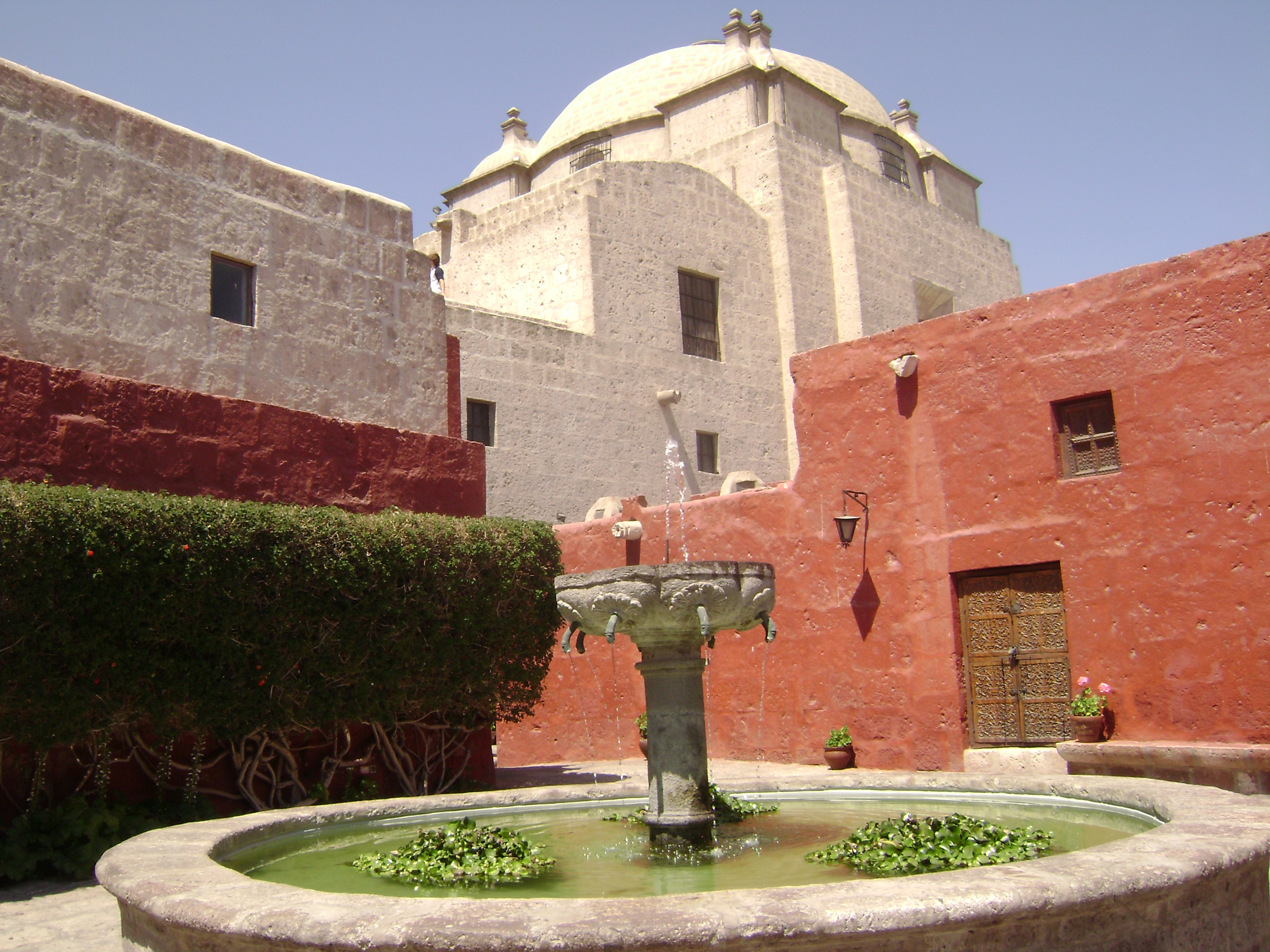
Fountain at the Convent of Santa Catalina.

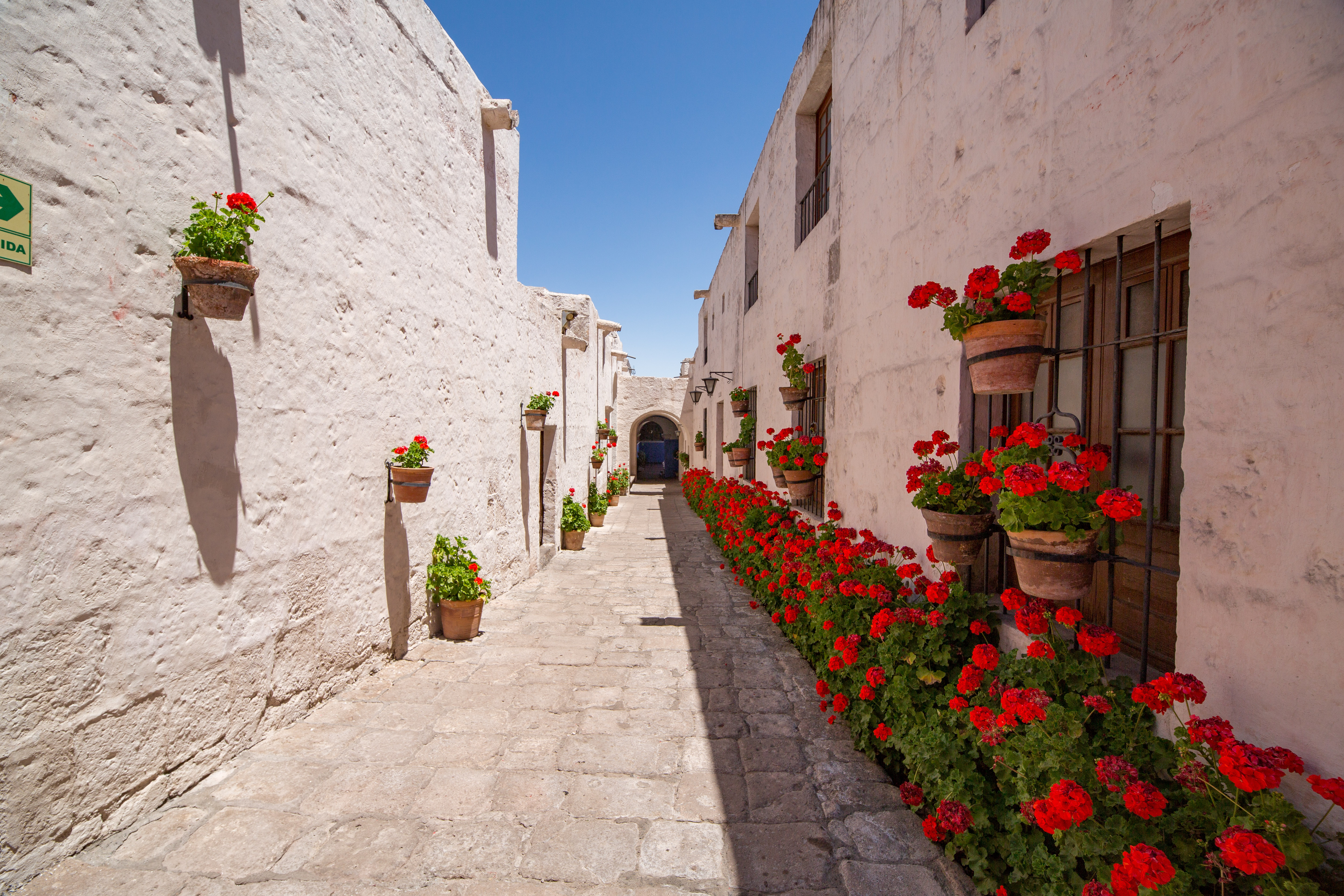
White street with red geraniums in the monastery

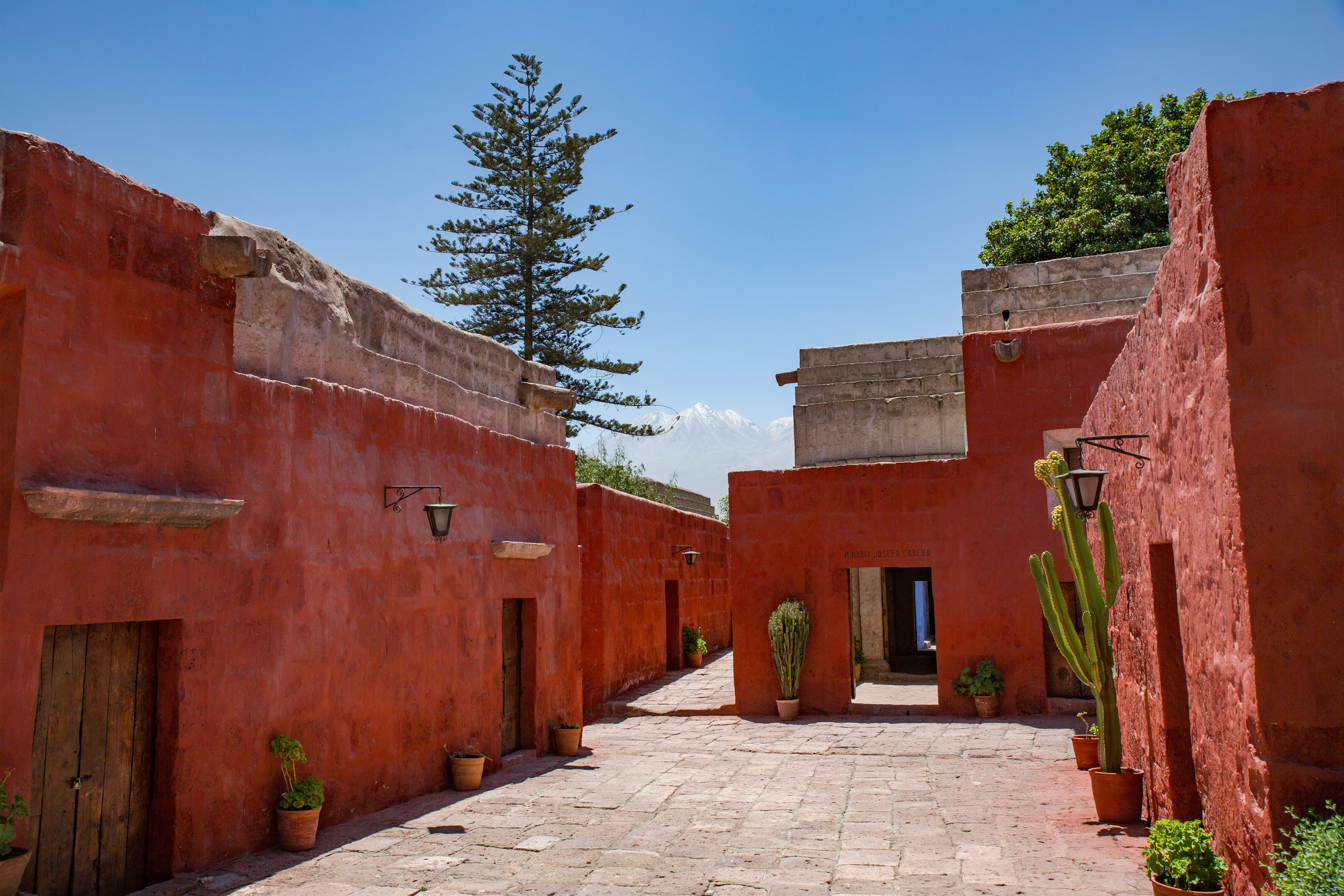
Red street in the monastery

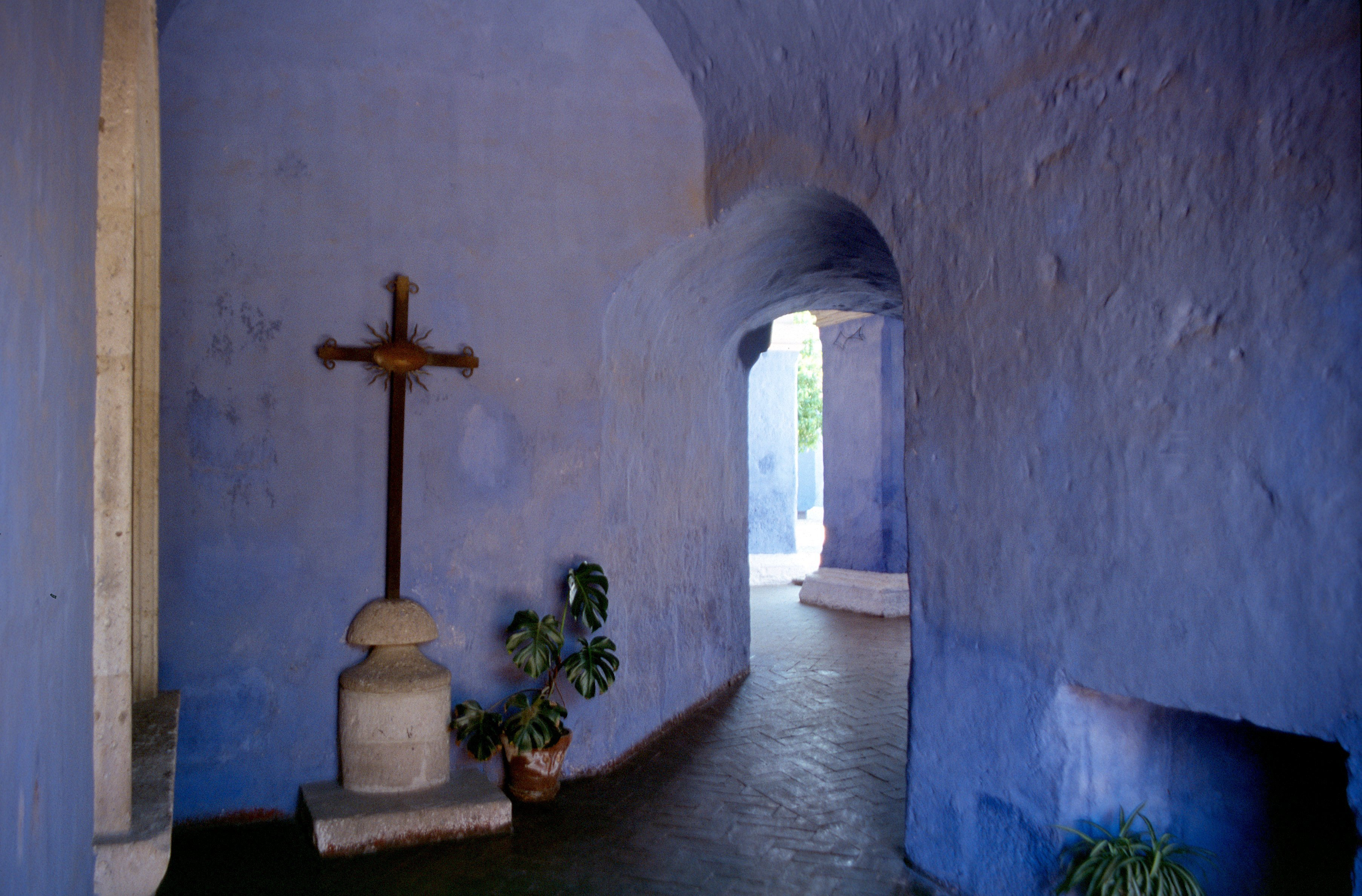
Santa Catalina Monastery.

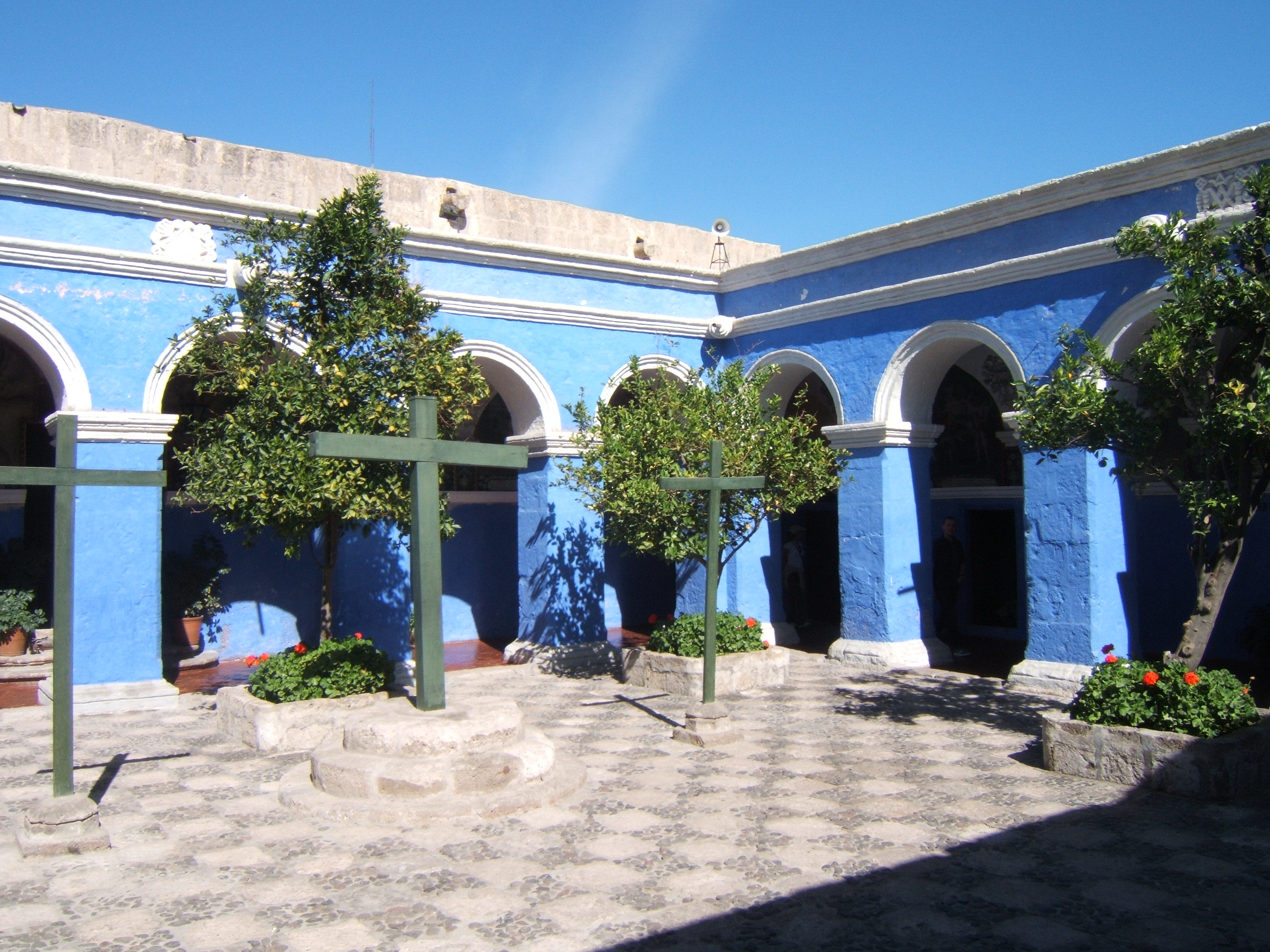
Cloister de los Naranjos

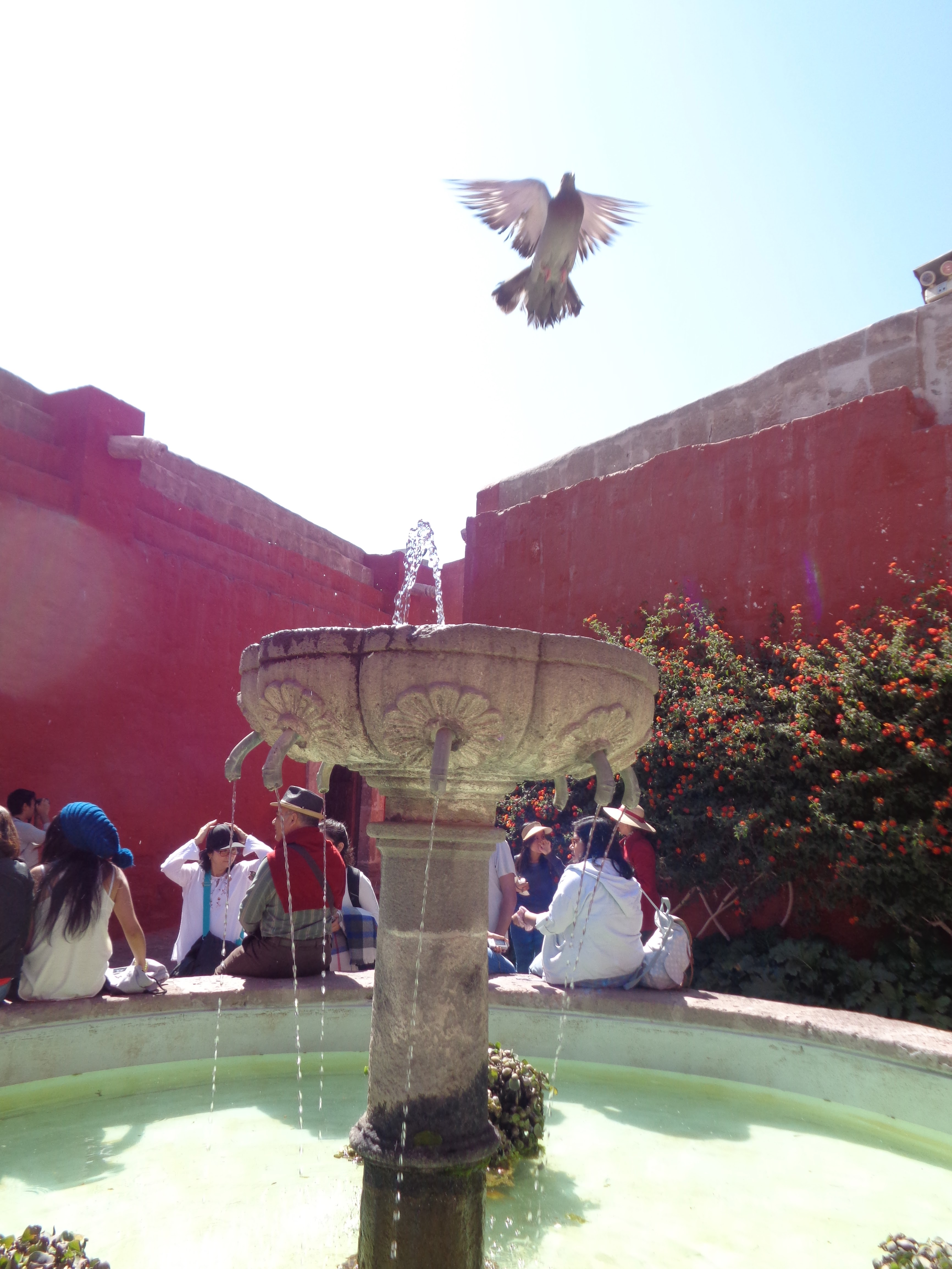
Fountain of the monastery

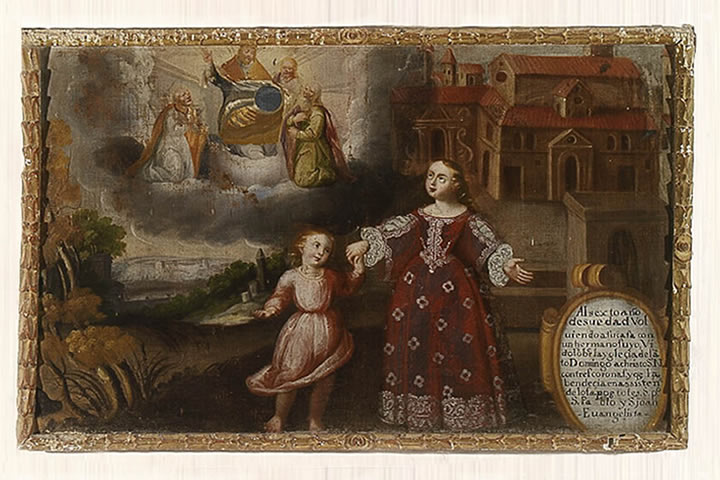
"Saint Catherine as a child sees Jesus Pontiff", painted in 1631, part of the museum collection.

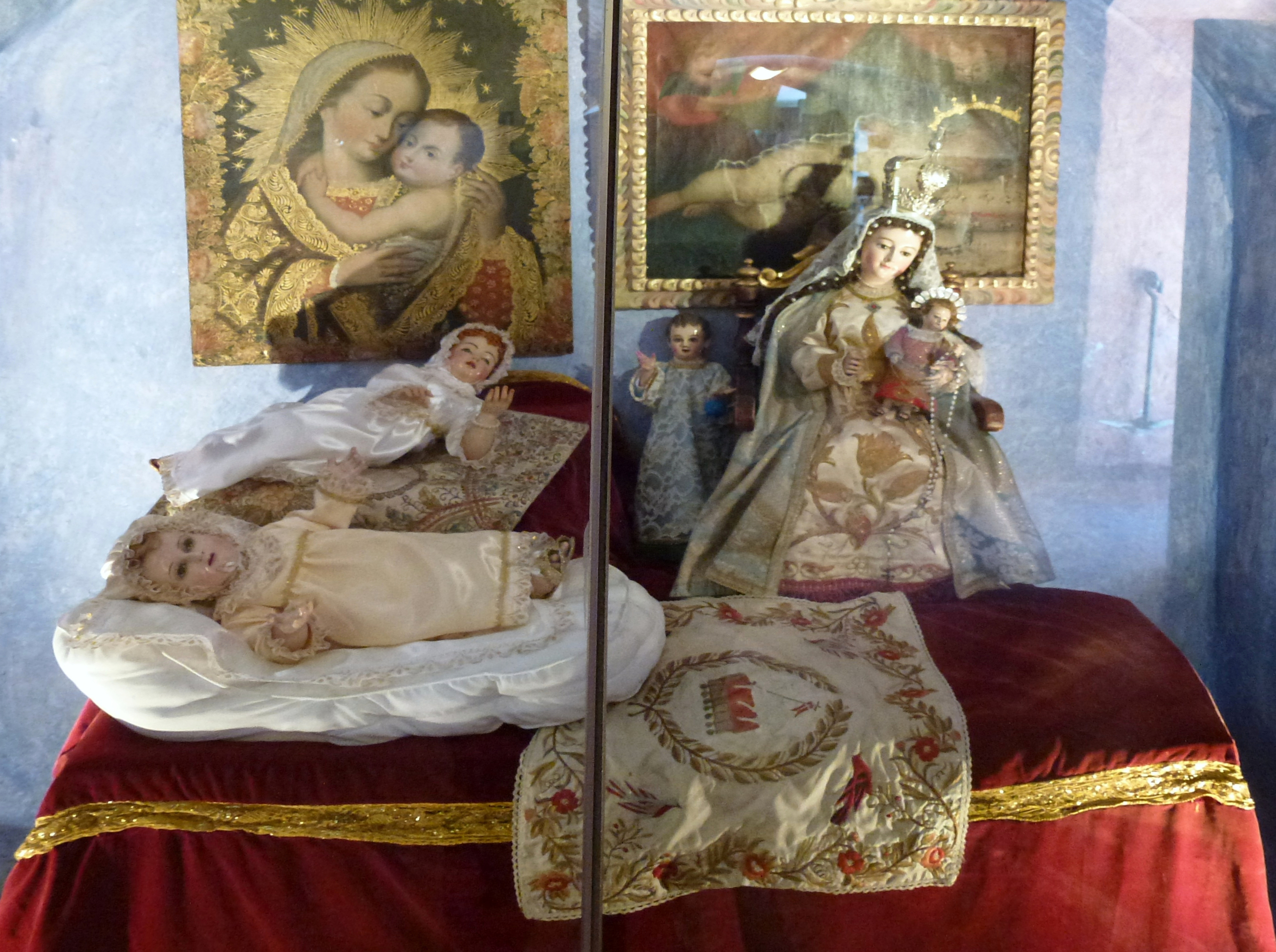
Colonial museum

== See also ==
- Ana de los Angeles Monteagudo

== Sources ==
- Lonely Planet Peru (2004). Charlotte Beech and Rob Rachowiecki. Lonely Planet Publications. ISBN 1-74059-209-3
