= Duran (surname) =

Duran or Durán is a Spanish surname that may refer to the following people:

== Arts ==
=== Actors ===
- Dan Duran (broadcaster), Canadian television entertainment journalist and actor
- Rafael Durán (1911–1994), Spanish actor
- Tita Duran (1929–1991), Filipina film actress

=== Artists ===
- Carolus-Duran (Charles Auguste Émile Durand; 1837–1917), French painter
- Tony Duran (photographer), American photographer
- Victorina Durán (1899–1993), Spanish artist

=== Musicians and composers ===
- Alejo Durán (1919–1989), Colombian composer, singer and accordionist
- Dolores Duran (1930–1959), Brazilian singer and composer
- Domingo Marcos Durán (c.1465–1529), Spanish music theorist and choirmaster
- Eddie Duran (1925–2019), American jazz guitarist
- Elena Duran (born 1949), Mexican American flautist
- Gustavo Durán (1906–1969), Spanish composer, soldier and diplomat
- Hilario Durán (born 1953), Cuban jazz pianist
- Ivan Duran, Belizean music producer and musician
- Joaquín Valverde Durán (1846–1910), Spanish composer, conductor and flautist
- Lucy Durán, UK-based ethnomusicologist, record producer and radio presenter
- Tony Duran, member of the American band Ruben and the Jets
- Elaine Duran, Filipino Singer

=== Writers ===
- Aaron Duran (born 1976), American writer and media producer
- Diego Durán (1537–1588), 16th century chronicler of the Aztecs
- Jane Duran (born 1944), Cuban-born poet
- José María Pasquini Durán (1939–2010), Argentine journalist

== Politics ==
- Blanca Inés Durán Hernández (born 1971), Colombian politician
- Crisanta Duran (born 1980), American politician in Colorado
- Dianna Duran (born 1956), American politician in New Mexico
- Enric Duran (born 1976), Catalan anticapitalist activist
- Florencio Durán (1893–1978), President of the Senate of Chile from 1941 to 1944
- Francisco Martin Duran (born 1968), American criminal who attempted to assassinate President Bill Clinton in 1994
- Germán García Durán, Colombian diplomat
- John Duran, American politician in California
- José Antonio Durán (1810-1880), Argentine military man and politician
- Josep Antoni Duran i Lleida (born 1952), Spanish politician
- Luisa Durán (born 1941), former First Lady of Chile
- Onofre Durán (1836–1914), former vice president of El Salvador
- Sixto Durán Ballén (1921–2016), former president of Ecuador

== Sports ==
=== Baseball and softball ===
- Andrea Duran (born 1984), American softball player
- Carlos Durán (baseball) (born 2001), Dominican baseball player
- Dan Duran (baseball) (born 1954), American baseball player
- Ezequiel Durán (born 1999), Dominican baseball player
- Germán Durán (born 1984), Mexican-American baseball player
- Jarren Duran (born 1996), American baseball player
- Jhoan Durán (born 1998), Dominican baseball player
- Roberto Durán (baseball) (born 1973), Dominican baseball player

=== Boxing and martial arts ===
- Jacob Duran (born 1951), American cutman
- José Durán (born 1945), Spanish boxer
- Kutluhan Duran (born 2000), Turkish karateka
- Massimiliano Duran (born 1963), Italian boxer
- Ossie Duran (born 1977 as Osumanu Yahaya), Ghanaian boxer
- Reuben Duran (born 1983), American mixed martial artist
- Roberto Durán (born 1951), Panamanian former professional boxer

=== Football (soccer) ===
- Antonio Durán (1924–2009), Spanish football player and manager
- Carlos Durán (born 1958), Chilean football manager
- Favio Durán (born 1995), Argentine footballer
- Francisco Manuel Durán (born 1988), Spanish footballer
- Hugo González Durán (born 1990), Mexican footballer
- Jhon Durán (born 2003), Colombian footballer
- Luís Marcelo Durán (born 1974), Uruguayan footballer
- Manuel Agudo Durán (born 1986), Spanish footballer
- Rubén Durán (born 1983), Spanish footballer
- Sargon Duran (born 1987), Austrian footballer

=== Other ===
- Alejandro Durán (cyclist) (born 1991), Argentine racing cyclist
- Arkaitz Durán (born 1986), Spanish racing cyclist
- Cassius Duran (born 1979), Brazilian diver
- Guillermo Durán (born 1988), Argentine tennis player
- Mariah Duran (born 1996), American skateboarder
- Rafael Duran (born 1938), Venezuelan former Olympic wrestler
- Riley Duran (born 2002), American ice hockey player
- Salvador Durán (born 1985), Mexican racing driver
- Sergi Durán (born 1976), Spanish tennis player

== Other ==
- Agustín Durán (1789–1862), Spanish scholar
- Alfredo Duran (born 1936), Cuban-born American lawyer
- Andrés Durán (born 1966), Colombian rock historian, radio broadcaster and producer
- Carolyn Duran, American materials scientist
- Desiree Durán (born 1985), Bolivian model and beauty contestant
- Elvis Duran (born 1964), American radio host
- Enver Duran (born 1945), Turkish medic and educator
- Franklin Duran (born 1967), Venezuelan entrepreneur
- George Duran (born 1975), American chef and entertainer
- Inés García de Durán (1928–2011), Colombian folklorist
- Jaime González Durán (born 1971), Mexican drug trafficker
- José Durán (disambiguation), multiple people
- Khalid Duran (1939–2010), scholar of the Islamic world
- Manuel Garcia-Duran, Spanish businessman
- María Ángeles Durán (born 1942), Spanish sociologist
- Maria Duran (c. 1710 – ?), Portuguese nun
- Narciso Durán (1776–1846), Franciscan friar and missionary
- Profiat Duran, Catalan physician, philosopher, grammarian, and controversialist
- Rosa Maria Duran (1927–2026), Catalan activist in Mexico
- Simeon ben Zemah Duran (1361–1444), also known as the Rashbatz, Majorcan Rabbinical authority and medic
- Solomon ben Simon Duran (1400–1467), also known as the Rashbash, Algerian rabbi
