= Manuel García =

Manuel Garcia may refer to:

== Academia ==
- Manuel García Gargallo (born 1973), Spanish historian
- Manuel García Velarde (born 1941), Spanish physicist

== Arts and entertainment ==
- Manuel García (baritone) (1805–1906), Spanish singer & voice pedagogue; son of Manuel García (tenor)
- Manuel García Ferré (1929–2013), Spanish comic book artist
- Manuel García Hispaleto (1836–1898), Spanish painter
- Manuel García (Puerto Rican artist) (1670–1700), Puerto Rican painter
- Manuel García y Rodríguez (1863–1925), Spanish painter
- Manuel Garcia-Rulfo (born 1981), Mexican actor
- Manuel García (singer-songwriter) (born 1970), Chilean singer-songwriter
- Manuel García (tenor) (1775–1832), Spanish singer and composer, father of Manuel Patricio Rodríguez García
- Manolo García (make-up artist) (aka Manuel García), Spanish make-up artist

== Military ==
- Manuel García Banqueda (1803–1872), Chilean Minister of War and Navy
- Manuel García de la Huerta (fl. 1877–1878), Chilean Minister of War and Navy
- Garcí Manuel de Carbajal (died 1552), Spanish lieutenant

== Politics and law ==
- Manuel García Barzanallana (1817–1892), Spanish noble and politician
- Manuel García Corpus (born 1958), Mexican politician from Oaxaca
- Manuel García (governor) (fl. 1826–1829), Spanish governor of Melilla
- Manuel García-Mansilla (born 1970), Argentine lawyer
- Manuel García de la Huerta (1868–1940), Chilean politician
- Manuel García de Sena, Venezuelan translator and revolutionary
- Manuel García del Moral, Spanish businessman and politician
- Manuel García Pelayo (1909–1991), Spanish jurist
- Manuel García Prieto, Marquis of Alhucemas (1859–1938), Spanish prime minister
- Manuel José García (1784–1848), Argentine politician, lawyer, economist and diplomat

== Sports ==
=== Association football ===
- Manuel García (footballer, born 1980), Argentinian football forward
- Manuel García (footballer, born 1985), Chilean football midfielder
- Manuel García (footballer, born 8 July 1988), Argentine football goalkeeper
- Manuel García (footballer, born 31 July 1988), Mexican football defender
- Manu García (disambiguation), several players

=== Other sports ===
- Manuel García (boxer) (born 1935), Spanish Olympic boxer
- Manuel García (biathlete) (born 1955), Spanish Olympic biathlete
- Manuel García (cyclist) (born 1964), cyclist from Guam
- Cocaína García (Manuel García Carranza, 1905–1995), Cuban baseball player

== Others ==
- Manuel Garcia-Duran, Spanish businessman
- Manuel García Gil (1802–1881), Spanish Roman Catholic cardinal

== Second surname ==
- Manuel Pereiras García (born 1950), Cuban author and translator
- Manuel Rebollo García (born 1945), Spanish Navy admiral

== Other uses ==
- Manuel Garcia, Texas, a census-designated place in Starr County, Texas, United States

== See also ==
- José Manuel García (disambiguation)
