= José Durán =

José Durán may refer to:

- José Durán (boxer) (born 1945), Spanish boxer
- Jose Duran (designer), Dominican-born American fashion designer
- José Durán (Spanish footballer) (born 1974), Spanish footballer
- José Durán (swimmer) (born 1951), Spanish swimmer
- José Antonio Duran (born 1946), Mexican boxer
- José Antonio Durán (c. 1810–1880s), Argentine military officer and politician
- José María Pasquini Durán (1939–2010), Argentine journalist

See also

- Josep Antoni Duran i Lleida (born 1952), Spanish politician
