= Mario Méndez =

Mario Méndez may refer to:

- Mario Méndez (Mexican footballer) (born 1979), Mexican football player
- Mario Méndez (Panamanian footballer) (born 1977), Panamanian football defender and manager
- Mario Méndez (Uruguayan footballer) (1938-2020), Uruguayan footballer
- Mario Mendez (politician) (born 1989), American politician in the Rhode Island House of Representatives
- Mario Méndez Montenegro (1910-1965), assassinated first elected mayor of Guatemala City
- Mario Rafael Méndez Martínez (born 1957), Mexican politician
