= Othón Cuevas Córdova =

Mexican politician (1965–2020)

- Born: 2 July 1965; Oaxaca, Mexico
- Died: 28 December 2020 (aged 55)
- Education: Universidad del Valle de Atemajac
- Occupation: Politician
- Political party: PRDMORENA

Othón Cuevas Córdova (2 July 1965 – 28 December 2020) was a Mexican politician.

== Biography ==
In the 2006 general election he was elected to the Chamber of Deputies to represent the ninth district of Oaxaca for the Party of the Democratic Revolution (PRD).

He died of COVID-19 at age 55, during the COVID-19 pandemic in Mexico, five days after the death of his mother, also caused by the same illness. He was serving as a deputy in the Congress of Oaxaca for the National Regeneration Movement (Morena) at the time.
