= Loma Linda East, Starr County, Texas =

Loma Linda East, Texas
- CDP
- Interactive map of Loma Linda East, Texas
- Coordinates: 26°19′41″N 98°41′22″W
- Country: United States
- State: Texas
- County: Starr

Population (2020)
  - Total: 67
- Time zone: UTC-6 (Central (CST))
  - Summer (DST): UTC-5 (CDT)
- Zip Code: 78582

Loma Linda East is a census-designated place (CDP) in Starr County, Texas, United States. It is a new CDP, formed from part of the former La Casita-Garciasville CDP prior to the 2010 census, with a population of 44.

== Geography ==
Loma Linda East is located at 26°19′41″N 98°41′22″W (26.328130, -98.689413).

== Demographics ==
Historical population
Census	Pop.	Note	%±
2010	44		—
2020	67		52.3%
U.S. Decennial Census; 1850–1900 1910; 1920 1930 1940; 1950 1960 1970; 1980 1990 2000; 2010 2020

Loma Linda East first appeared as a census designated place in the 2010 U.S. census, one of nine CDPs (Amada Acres, Chaparrito, La Casita, Loma Linda East, Manuel Garcia, Manuel Garcia II, Olivia Lopez de Gutierrez, Ramirez-Perez, Victoria Vera) carved out of the deleted La Casita-Garciasville CDP.

=== 2020 census ===
Loma Linda East CDP, Texas – Racial and ethnic composition Note: the US Census treats Hispanic/Latino as an ethnic category. This table excludes Latinos from the racial categories and assigns them to a separate category. Hispanics/Latinos may be of any race.
Race / Ethnicity (NH = Non-Hispanic)	Pop 2010	Pop 2020	% 2010	% 2020
White alone (NH)	20	5	45.45%	7.46%
Black or African American alone (NH)	0	0	0.00%	0.00%
Native American or Alaska Native alone (NH)	0	0	0.00%	0.00%
Asian alone (NH)	0	0	0.00%	0.00%
Native Hawaiian or Pacific Islander alone (NH)	0	0	0.00%	0.00%
Other race alone (NH)	0	0	0.00%	0.00%
Mixed race or Multiracial (NH)	0	0	0.00%	0.00%
Hispanic or Latino (any race)	24	62	54.55%	92.54%
Total	44	67	100.00%	100.00%

== Education ==
The CDP is within the Rio Grande City Grulla Independent School District (formerly Rio Grande City Consolidated Independent School District)
