= José Manuel García =

José Manuel García is the name of:

- José Manuel García Bedoya, Peruvian politician
- José Manuel García (runner) (born 1966), Spanish runner
- José Manuel García Guevara (born 1988), Mexican criminal
- José Manuel García (footballer) (1950–2014), Spanish footballer
- José Manuel García-Margallo (born 1944), Spanish politician
- José Manuel García Maurin (born 1997), Spanish footballer
- José Manuel García Naranjo (born 1994), Spanish footballer
- Txema Garcia (José Manuel García Luena, born 1974), Spanish-born Andorran footballer
