= Manu García =

Manu García may refer to:

- Manu García (footballer, born 1986), Spanish footballer
- Manu García (footballer, born 1991), Spanish footballer
- Manu García (footballer, born 1998), Spanish footballer

== See also ==
- Manuel García (disambiguation)
