= Basilica Cathedral of Arequipa =

- Catedral Basílica de Arequipa (Spanish)
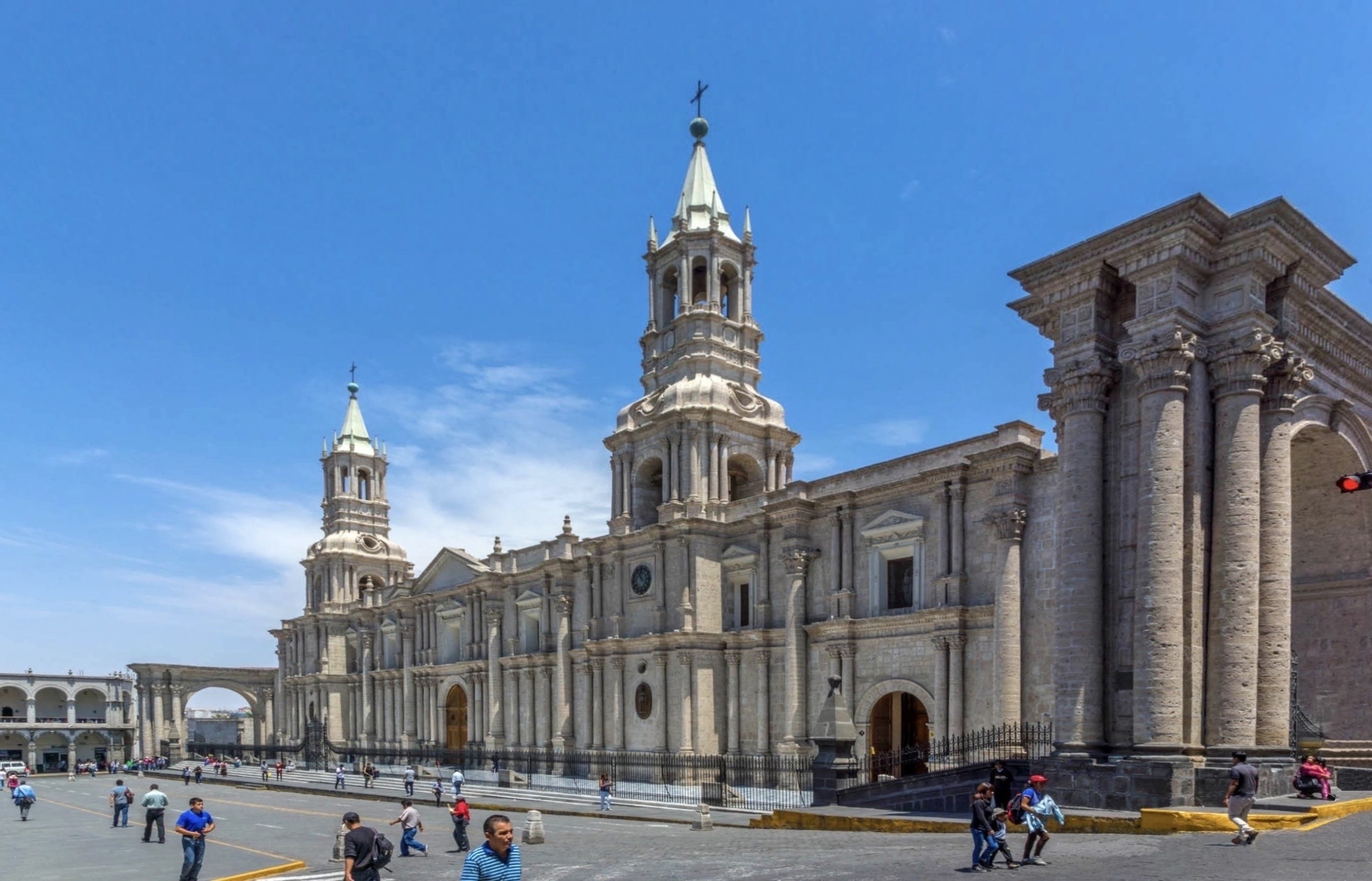
- Cathedral in 2015
- Basilica Cathedral of Arequipa
- 16°23′53″S 71°32′12″W
- Location: Plaza de Armas, Arequipa
- Country: Peru
- Denomination: Catholic Church
- Sui iuris church: Latin Church

Architecture
- Architect: Lucas Poblete
- Groundbreaking: 1540
- Completed: 1656

Administration
- Archdiocese: Archdiocese of Arequipa

Clergy
- Archbishop: Javier Augusto Del Río Alba

Cultural Heritage of Peru
- Official name: Basílica Catedral de la ciudad de Arequipa
- Type: Immovable tangible
- Criteria: Monument
- Designated: 10 February 1964; 62 years ago
- Legal basis: R.S. Nº 057

The Basilica Cathedral of Arequipa ("Basílica Catedral", in Spanish) is located in the Main Square "Plaza de Armas" of the city of Arequipa, province of Arequipa, Peru. It is the most important Catholic church of the city and also of the larger Roman Catholic Archdiocese of Arequipa since it is the base of the archbishop and the metropolitan council. The design of the building is contributed to the architect Lucas Poblete. The cathedral is also considered one of Peru's most unusual and famous colonial cathedrals since the Spanish conquest.

== History ==
=== Early construction ===
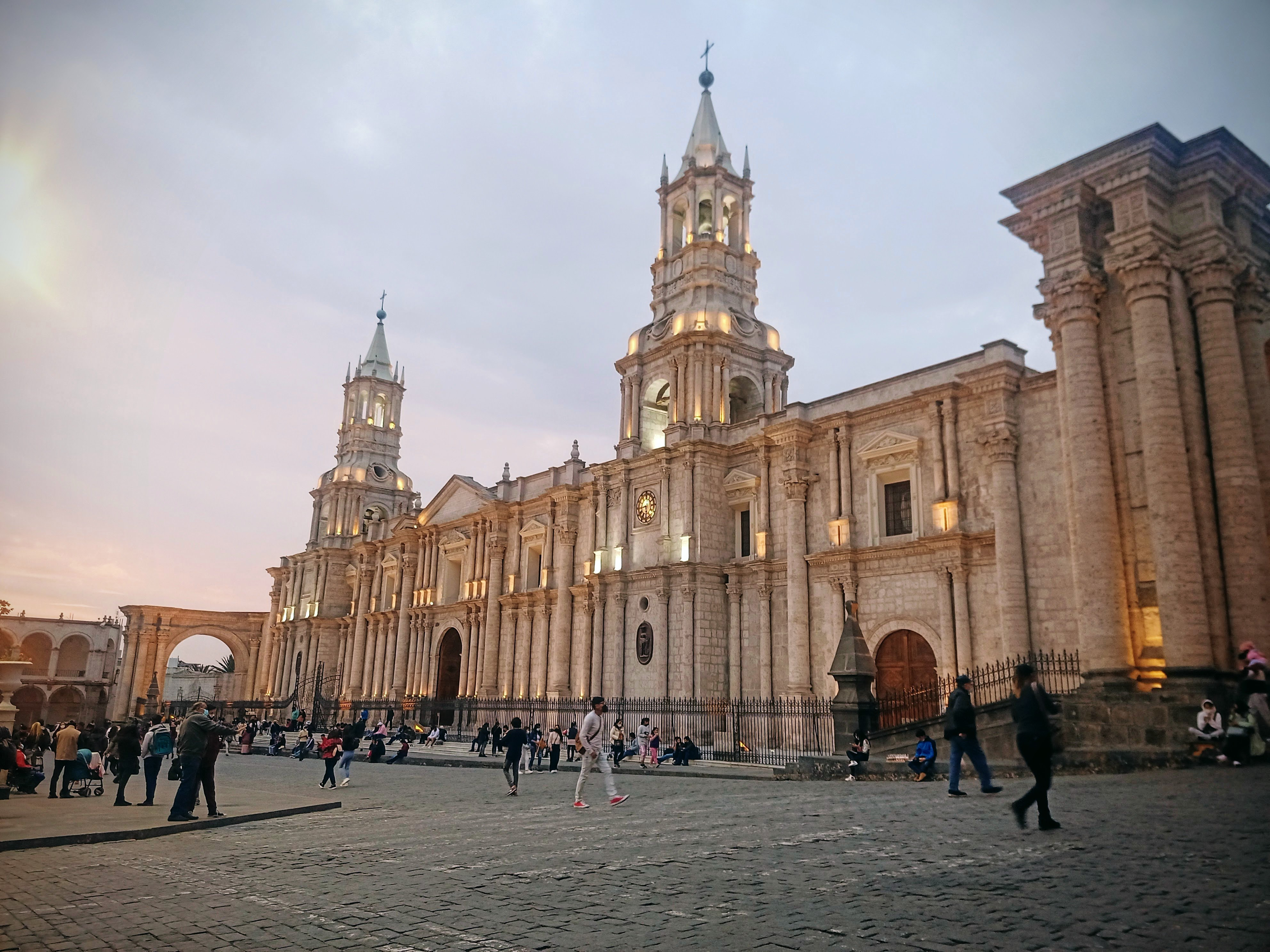
Cathedral of Arequipa

On August 15 1540, the city of Arequipa was founded by Garcí Manuel de Carbajal. The cathedral started construction on this very date. In the "Act of Foundation" of Arequipa, it can be read: "...in the name of its majesty Governor Francisco Pizarro, founded the beautiful village in the valley of Arequipa, in the Collasuyo section, above the river edge, in his name he put the cross, in the location signaled for the Church; He put the pike in the Plaza of the village, which he stated would do in the name of its majesty..."

The representatives of the Council, Justice and Directorate of the city signed a contract with the architect Pedro Godínez in February of 1544, then regent of the city and commander of San Juan Bautista de Characato, and the carpenters Juan Rodríguez and Gregorio Álvarez to build the church.

In September 1544, Miguel Cornejo, the mayor of the city, assigned the building of the portal to the master Toribio de Alcaraz, who agreed to build it using white volcanic ignimbrite (sillar). The church is built with two main sections. The progress of construction of the church was destroyed after a major earthquake in 1583.

In 1590, it was decided to rebuild again the main church, and this is assigned to Gaspar Báez, who is helped by several Spanish officials and many hundreds of "Mitayo" Indians. The new design would have three sections, arcs and vaults of brick.

When construction was almost finished in 1600, the violent eruption of the Huaynaputina stratovolcano (also known as Quinistaquillas or Omate), together with several earthquakes and a rain of ash, destroyed part of the structure.

In 1609, Bula of Pope Paul V created the Arequipa Diocese, separating it from the one in Cuzco. The Arequipan Catholics had become impoverished since the Volcano eruption, but decided to rebuild the cathedral.

On January 27, 1621, Mr. Andrés de Espinoza was assigned the construction of the cathedral. In 1628, Espinoza died.

In 1656, the construction of the cathedral was finished. It had three sections, 180 feet long by 84 feet wide (84.86 m by 25.6 m), 8 pillars, 5 chapels, 22 arcs, 15 brick vaults. Between 1656 and 1668, numerous earthquakes caused damage to the cathedral.

Architectural Design

The cathedral represents three types, the first two are related to the plan and spatial components. The first is called the basilica type and the second is the hall type. The third type is atomization, a compositional principle that develops the form of volumes rather than spaces.

The basilica type is represented by the spatial components of the plan. The plan has three naves: a central nave and two lateral naves which intersect and form a Latin cross floor plan, common in the layout of Roman basilicas.

The second type is the hall type. This type is characterized by having the interior naves of a church at the same or nearly the same height, whereas in a traditional Latin cross plan, the central nave is always taller than the lateral naves.

Atomization is a compositional principle of Neoclassicism. It means parts of a building collectively form the whole while maintaining their independence. In the cathedral, there is no single hierarchical order; instead, each element asserts its own identity. The main body of the naves extends horizontally, while the two bell towers rise verticality. The pediment above the plaza entrance spans four columns. The lateral arches are oriented in the opposite direction to the nave. Functionally, the bell towers mark the cathedral’s location from a distance, the arches guide access to the plaza and atrium, and the pediment signals the entrance to the building. Each component has a distinct purpose, and none is subordinate to the others.

=== Reconstruction efforts ===
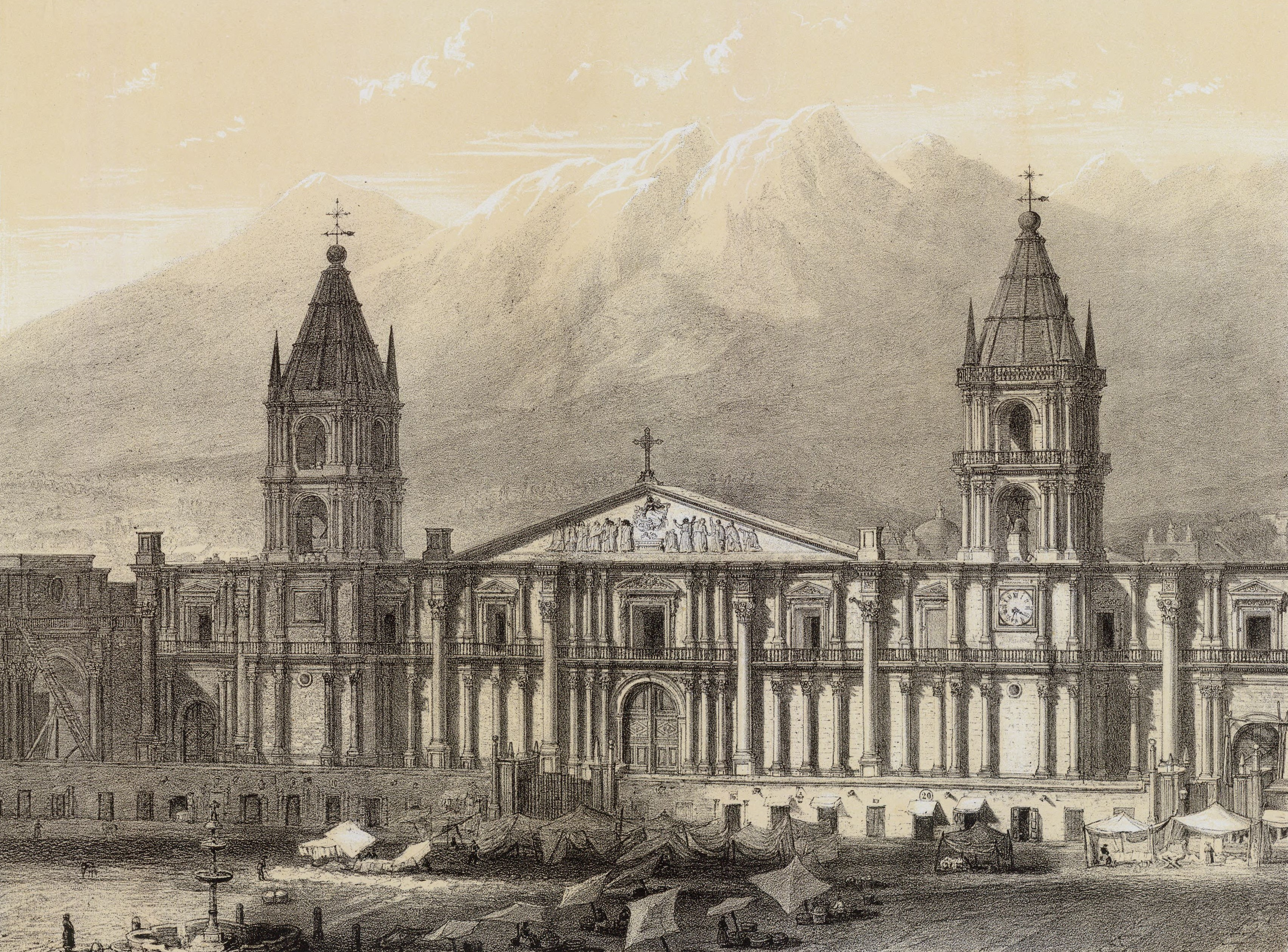
The Cathedral of Arequipa c. 1864

The cathedral is a result of a series of constructions and reconstructions from 1544, with the erection of the main church on site, to 1621, the completion of the first cathedral, to a series of reconstruction attempts due to fire and earthquakes, to what can be seen now.

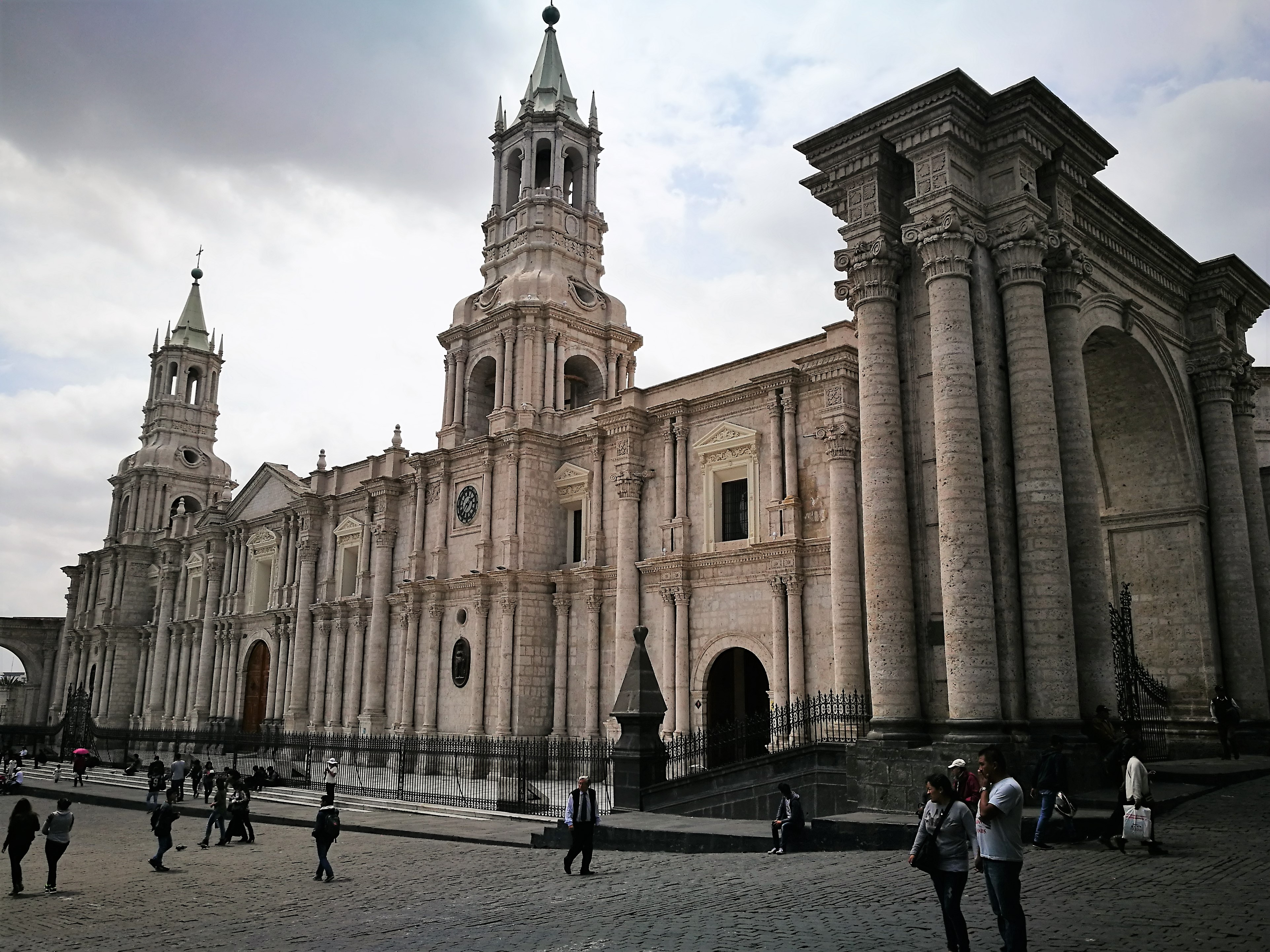
The Cathedral of Arequipa

Two major earthquakes in 1687 and 1784. Some damage was caused to the cathedral, but no structural damage. Partially reconstruction of the façade started immediately.

In 1844, a fire destroyed several parts of the church and many paintings, sculptures and furniture pieces, as well as several vaults and pillars. Present reconstruction work was made, under the direction of the Bishop José Sebastián de Goyeneche y Barreda, and his brother Juan Mariano de Goyeneche. Technical direction was under the architect Lucas Pobrete. In this restoration it was enlarged reaching the place of the old San Juan church (destroyed in 1784).

In 1850, the Bishop Goyeneche assigned the production of several jewelry pieces to adorn the cathedral to the Spanish jeweler Francisco de Moratilla, who was then jeweler of the Queen of Spain. The nephews of the bishop (the count of Guaqui, the duchesses of Goyeneche and Gamio and Jose Sebastian de Goyeneche) gave the cathedral the main altar (still exists today) which was installed by an Italian architect of last name Guido. The clock of the tower, made in England, was installed in 1954. Also the music organ and twelve giant wood sculptures, all made in Belgium, of the apostles.

The pulpit, made at the shop of Buisine-Rigot in Lille, France, was installed thanks to the Peruvian ambassador in France, Mr. Juan Mariano de Goyeneche, count of Guaqui in 1879. It was given to the church by Javiera Lizárraga de Alvarez Comparet.

A violent and long earthquake in 1868 destroyed several parts of the cathedral: the towers, part of the main portal, some of the façade arcs, and some altars. In the following years, thanks to the Bishop and the Goyeneche family and under the technical direction of Lucas Pobrete, the two towers and the façade arcs were rebuilt. Poblete built the new tower taller and slenderer to accentuate the buildings proportions. The atrium was also expanded, with the 36 kiosks, which were used by priests to obtain rent income, removed for a better extended view of the cathedral from the plaza.

The 2001 southern Peru earthquake heavily affected the city of Arequipa with forty percent of its representative buildings either damaged or partially collapsed. On July 23rd, 2001, the 8.3 magnitude earthquake, which occurred 1,100 kilometers south of Lima, and about 250 kilometers west of Arequipa, damaged both towers. The left tower was left partially collapsed, and the right tower, although it did not collapse, remained structurally unstable. The slenderness of the towers left them both very susceptible to earthquake damage, thus new structural solutions were required to withstand the seismic forces.

== Overview ==
Layout

The cathedral is located in a square grid that has a length of 110 meters. The cathedral is located on the north side with three arcades surrounding it on the east west and south sides. The center is symbolic of the throne of God and is meant to be a place of celebration.

=== Exterior ===
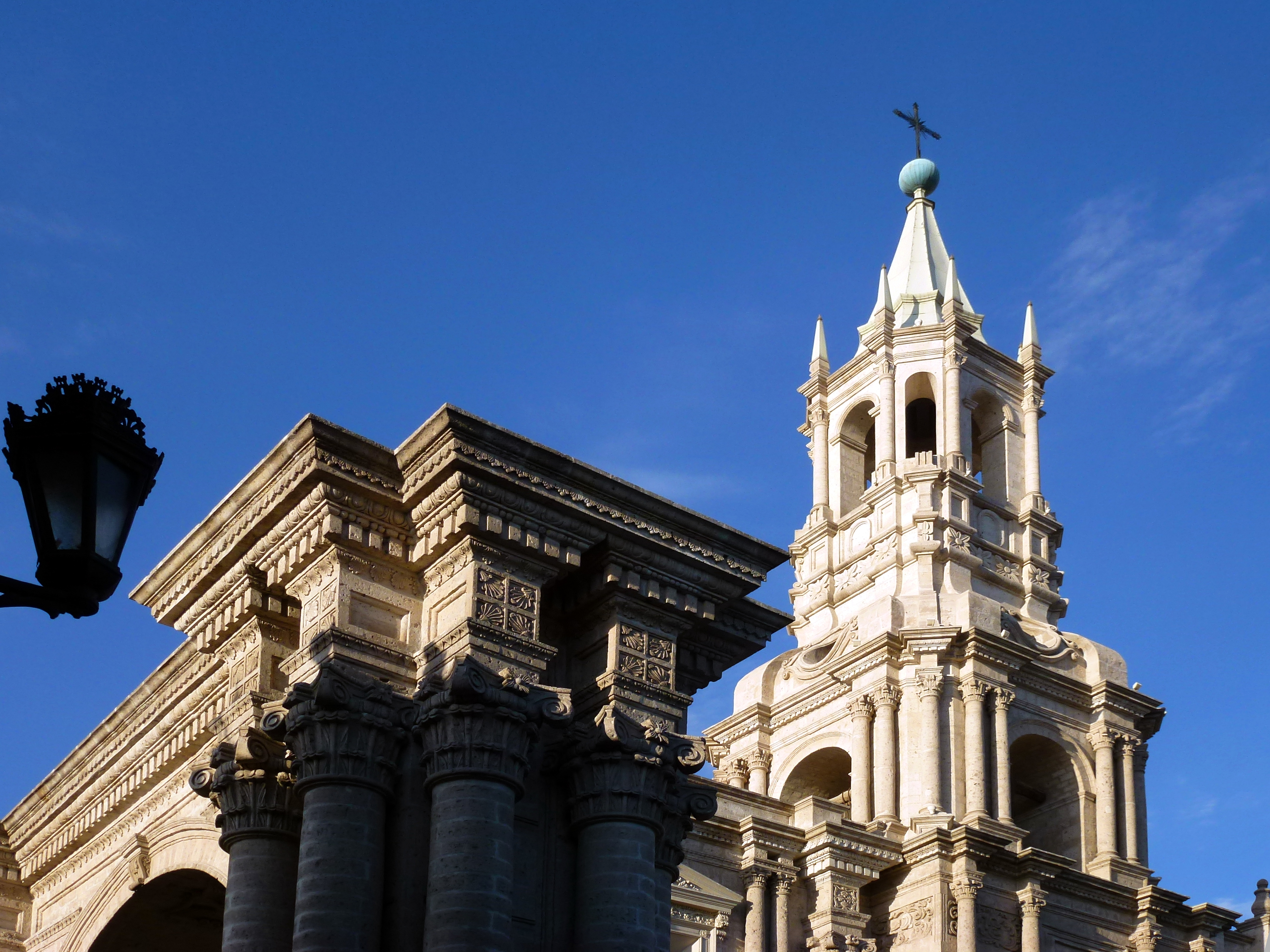
The western tower of the Cathedral

The cathedral was built with ignimbrite (volcanic rock) and brick vaults; it is the city's main sanctuary, occupying the entire north side of the Plaza de Armas. Constructed entirely of sillar (volcanic stone), it exhibits a Neo-Renaissance style with some Gothic influence. Its façade consists of seventy columns with Corinthian capitals, three portals, and two large side arches. It is crowned by two tall, stylized Renaissance towers.

The building was rebuilt after the fire of 1844. Its architecture is Neoclassical. The church is decorated with a large organ of Belgian origin (one of the largest in South America), a large chandelier from Seville, a French Neo-Gothic pulpit, Carrara marble, and European wood carvings. It also houses treasures of gold and silverwork, such as two monstrances adorned with gold and diamonds.

=== Interior ===
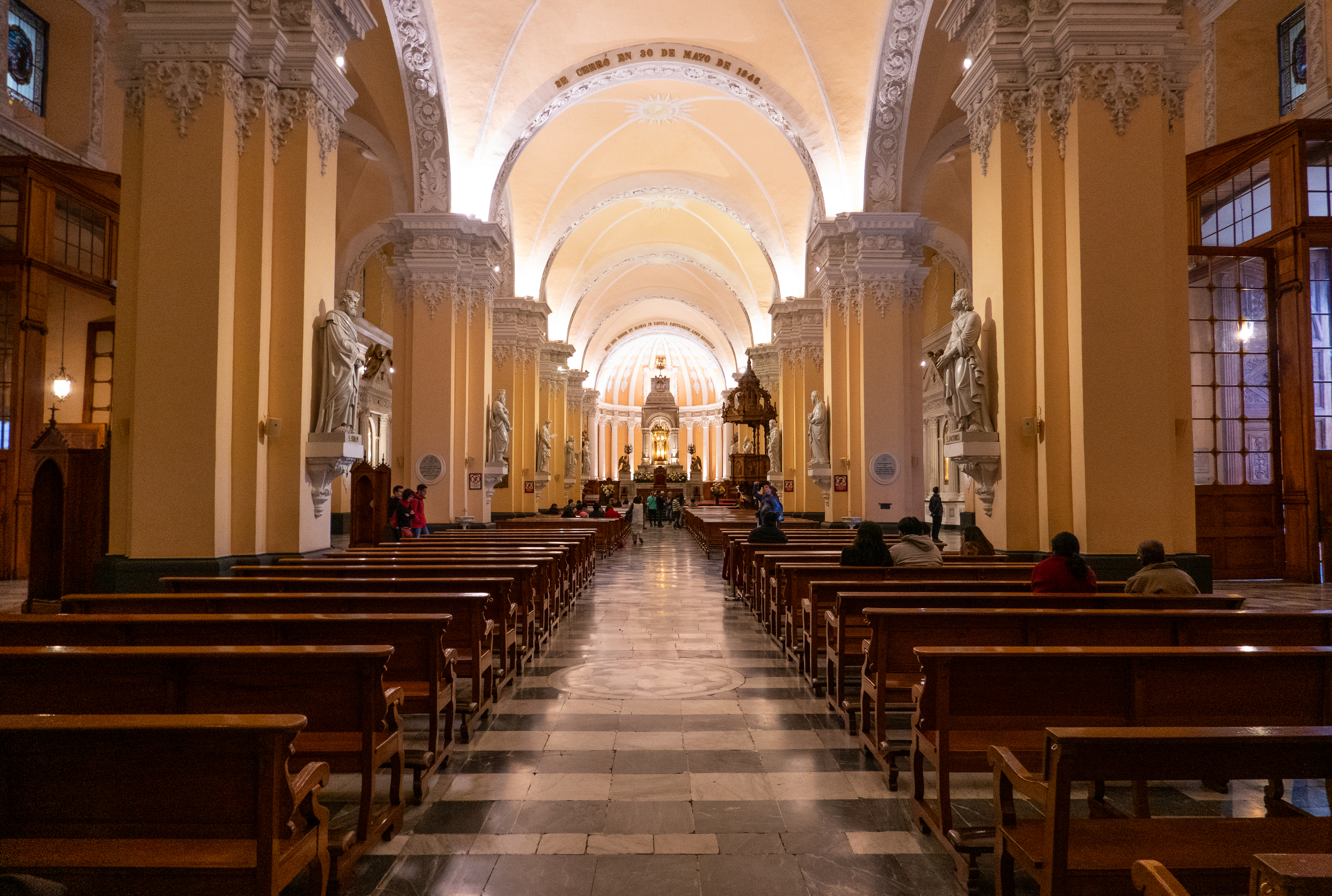
Naves of the Cathedral of Arequipa

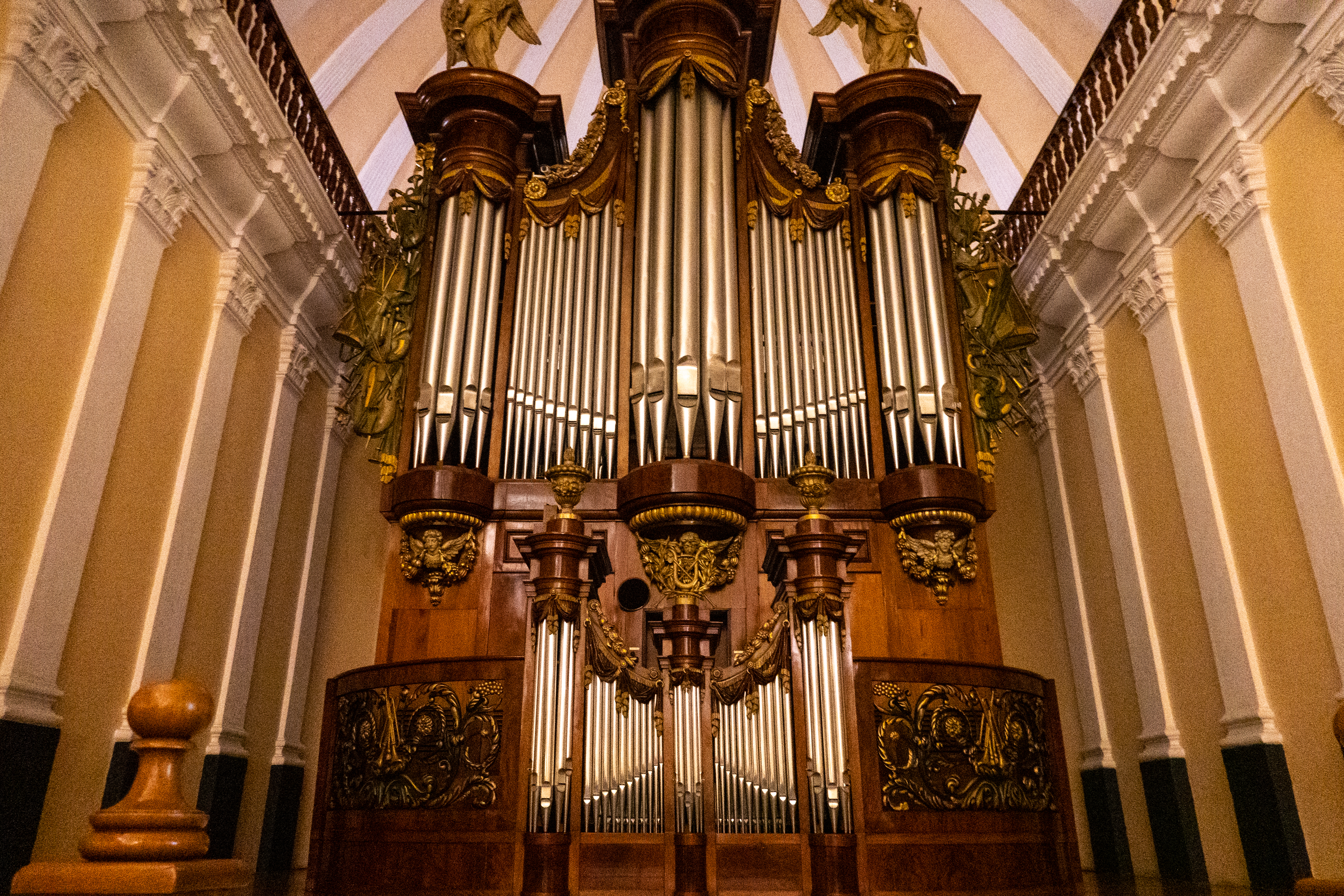
Main organ of the cathedral

Inside is the main altar, made of Carrara marble and crafted by Felipe Maratillo. The interior of the cathedral consists of three naves. In the central nave, the incomparable pulpit stands out, carved from oak by the artist Buisine Rigot in Lille, France, depicting Christ defeating the serpent. At the far end is a Belgian organ, valued for being one of the largest in South America. The Chapel of the Lord of Great Power is frequently visited by locals.

The arcades

The Main Square is encapsulated by three arcades on the East, West, and South sides. They were designed to primarily provide coverage from the rain or the sun. Their current names are, Portal de Flores (east side), Portal de la Municipalidad (south side), and Portal de San Agustin (west side). The arched also have a history of being changed or modified, but currently are two stories in height, and built with the same volcanic stone, sillar.

== See also ==
- List of colonial buildings in Arequipa

== Related Sites ==
- (in Spanish) Catedral de Arequipa
