= Victoria Vera, Texas =

- CDP
- Interactive map of Victoria Vera, Texas
- Coordinates: 26°19′5″N 98°41′35″W
- Country: United States
- State: Texas
- County: Starr

Population (2020)
  - Total: 93
- Time zone: UTC-6 (Central (CST))
  - Summer (DST): UTC-5 (CDT)
- Zip Code: 78582

Victoria Vera is a census-designated place (CDP) in Starr County, Texas, United States. It is a new CDP, formed from part of the former La Casita-Garciasville CDP prior to the 2010 census. As of the 2020 census, Victoria Vera had a population of 93.

== Geography ==
Victoria Vera is located at 26°19′5″N 98°41′35″W (26.318087, -98.692960).

== Demographics ==
Historical population
Census	Pop.	Note	%±
2010	110		—
2020	93		−15.5%
U.S. Decennial Census; 1850–1900 1910; 1920 1930 1940; 1950 1960 1970; 1980 1990 2000; 2010 2020

Victoria Vera first appeared as a census designated place in the 2010 U.S. census, one of nine CDPs (Amada Acres, Chaparrito, La Casita, Loma Linda East, Manuel Garcia, Manuel Garcia II, Olivia Lopez de Gutierrez, Ramirez-Perez, Victoria Vera) carved out of the deleted La Casita-Garciasville CDP.

=== 2020 census ===
Victoria Vera CDP, Texas – Racial and ethnic composition Note: the US Census treats Hispanic/Latino as an ethnic category. This table excludes Latinos from the racial categories and assigns them to a separate category. Hispanics/Latinos may be of any race.
Race / Ethnicity (NH = Non-Hispanic)	Pop 2010	Pop 2020	% 2010	% 2020
White alone (NH)	0	1	0.00%	1.08%
Black or African American alone (NH)	0	0	0.00%	0.00%
Native American or Alaska Native alone (NH)	0	0	0.00%	0.00%
Asian alone (NH)	0	0	0.00%	0.00%
Native Hawaiian or Pacific Islander alone (NH)	0	0	0.00%	0.00%
Other race alone (NH)	0	0	0.00%	0.00%
Mixed race or Multiracial (NH)	0	0	0.00%	0.00%
Hispanic or Latino (any race)	110	92	100.00%	98.92%
Total	110	93	100.00%	100.00%

== Education ==
It is in the Rio Grande City Grulla Independent School District (formerly Rio Grande City Consolidated Independent School District)
