= Ángel Herrero (footballer, born 1942) =

Spanish footballer

Personal information
- Full name: Ángel Herrero Morales
- Date of birth: 1 March 1942
- Place of birth: Zamora, Spain
- Date of death: 12 January 2014 (aged 71)
- Place of death: Gijón, Spain
- Height: 1.73 m (5 ft 8 in)
- Position: Midfielder

Youth career
- 1956–1961: Real Madrid

Senior career*
Years	Team	Apps	(Gls)
1961–1962	Plus Ultra		
1962–1963	Langreo	27	(7)
1963–1964	Racing Santander	6	(0)
1964–1965	Ceuta	0	(0)
1965–1967	Rayo Vallecano	51	(2)
1967–1973	Sporting Gijón	118	(2)
Total		202	(11)
- * Club domestic league appearances and goals

Ángel Herrero Morales (1 March 1942 – 12 January 2014) was a Spanish professional footballer who played as a midfielder.

== Football career ==
Born in Zamora, Castile and León, Herrero finished his formation with Real Madrid. He played professionally for UP Langreo, Racing de Santander, CA Ceuta, Rayo Vallecano and Sporting de Gijón in a 12-year senior career, competing mainly in Segunda División.

With Asturias' Sporting, Herrero spent three years in La Liga, sharing teams with namesake José Manuel García Herrero and thus being known as Herrero I. He started playing as a defensive midfielder but spent his later career as a left back, retiring in 1973 at the age of 31.

== Later life and death ==
After retiring, Herrero settled in Gijón with his wife and daughters. He died on 12 January 2014 at the age of 71, from pulmonary edema.

== Honours ==
Sporting Gijón

- Segunda División: 1969–70
