= La Casita-Garciasville, Texas =

- former CDP
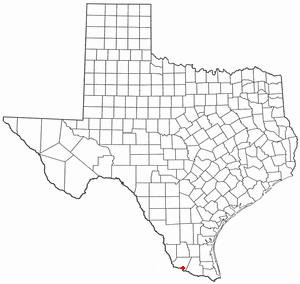
- Location of La Casita-Garciasville, Texas

- Coordinates: 26°19′34″N 98°42′25″W
- Country: United States
- State: Texas
- County: Starr

Area
  - Total: 4.4 sq mi (11.3 km^{2})
  - Land: 4.4 sq mi (11.3 km^{2})
  - Water: 0.039 sq mi (0.1 km^{2})

Population (2000)
  - Total: 2,177
  - Density: 501/sq mi (193.5/km^{2})
- Time zone: UTC-6 (Central (CST))
  - Summer (DST): UTC-5 (CDT)
- FIPS code: 48-40005

La Casita-Garciasville is a former census-designated place (CDP) in Starr County, Texas, United States. The population was 2,177 at the 2000 census.

== Geography ==
La Casita-Garciasville is located at 26°19′34″N 98°42′25″W (26.326127, -98.707054).

According to the United States Census Bureau, the CDP has a total area of 4.4 square miles (11.3 km^{2}), of which 4.3 square miles (11.2 km^{2}) is land and 0.04 square mile (0.1 km^{2}) (0.68%) is water.

== Demographics ==
Historical population
Census	Pop.	Note	%±
1990	1,186		—
2000	2,177		83.6%
U.S. Decennial Census; 1850–1900 1910; 1920 1930 1940; 1950 1960 1970; 1980 1990 2000; 2010

La Casita-Garciasville first appeared as a census designated place in the 1990 U.S. census. Prior to the 2010 census, the CDP was deleted and parts were taken to form Amada Acres, Chaparrito, La Casita, Loma Linda East, Manuel Garcia, Manuel Garcia II, Olivia Lopez de Gutierrez, Ramirez-Perez and Victoria Vera CDPs.

La Casita-Garciasville CDP, Texas – Racial and ethnic composition Note: the US Census treats Hispanic/Latino as an ethnic category. This table excludes Latinos from the racial categories and assigns them to a separate category. Hispanics/Latinos may be of any race.
Race / Ethnicity (NH = Non-Hispanic)	Pop 2000	% 2000
White alone (NH)	15	0.69%
Black or African American alone (NH)	0	0.00%
Native American or Alaska Native alone (NH)	0	0.00%
Asian alone (NH)	0	0.00%
Pacific Islander alone (NH)	0	0.00%
Other race alone (NH)	1	0.05%
Mixed race or Multiracial (NH)	3	0.14%
Hispanic or Latino (any race)	2,158	99.13%
Total	2,177	100.00%

As of the census of 2000, there were 2,177 people, 562 households, and 501 families residing in the CDP. The population density was 501.0 inhabitants per square mile (193.4/km^{2}). There were 668 housing units at an average density of 153.7 per square mile (59.3/km^{2}). The racial makeup of the CDP was 87.74% White, 0.05% Native American, 10.52% from other races, and 1.70% from two or more races. Hispanic or Latino of any race were 99.13% of the population.

There were 562 households, out of which 56.0% had children under the age of 18 living with them, 69.0% were married couples living together, 15.8% had a female householder with no husband present, and 10.7% were non-families. 10.5% of all households were made up of individuals, and 4.8% had someone living alone who was 65 years of age or older. The average household size was 3.87 and the average family size was 4.19.

In the CDP, the population was spread out, with 39.0% under the age of 18, 11.1% from 18 to 24, 27.4% from 25 to 44, 15.0% from 45 to 64, and 7.5% who were 65 years of age or older. The median age was 25 years. For every 100 females, there were 104.4 males. For every 100 females age 18 and over, there were 94.7 males.

The median income for a household in the CDP was $15,921, and the median income for a family was $17,149. Males had a median income of $14,948 versus $11,442 for females. The per capita income for the CDP was $5,507. About 44.9% of families and 53.0% of the population were below the poverty line, including 64.2% of those under age 18 and 32.7% of those age 65 or over.

== Education ==
Garciasville is served by the Rio Grande City Consolidated Independent School District.
