= Ramirez-Perez, Texas =

- CDP
- Interactive map of Ramirez-Perez, Texas
- Coordinates: 26°18′59.5″N 98°41′36″W
- Country: United States
- State: Texas
- County: Starr

Population (2020)
  - Total: 66
- Time zone: UTC-6 (Central (CST))
  - Summer (DST): UTC-5 (CDT)
- Zip Code: 78582

Ramirez-Perez is a census-designated place (CDP) in Starr County, Texas, United States. It is a new CDP, formed from part of the former La Casita-Garciasville CDP prior to the 2010 census. As of the 2020 census, Ramirez-Perez had a population of 66.

== Geography ==
Ramirez-Perez is located at 26°18′59.5″N 98°41′36″W (26.316531, -98.693340).

== Demographics ==
Historical population
Census	Pop.	Note	%±
2010	78		—
2020	66		−15.4%
U.S. Decennial Census; 1850–1900 1910; 1920 1930 1940; 1950 1960 1970; 1980 1990 2000; 2010 2020

Ramirez-Perez first appeared as a census designated place in the 2010 U.S. census, one of nine CDPs (Amada Acres, Chaparrito, La Casita, Loma Linda East, Manuel Garcia, Manuel Garcia II, Olivia Lopez de Gutierrez, Ramirez-Perez, Victoria Vera) carved out of the deleted La Casita-Garciasville CDP.

=== 2020 census ===
Ramirez-Perez CDP, Texas – Racial and ethnic composition Note: the US Census treats Hispanic/Latino as an ethnic category. This table excludes Latinos from the racial categories and assigns them to a separate category. Hispanics/Latinos may be of any race.
Race / Ethnicity (NH = Non-Hispanic)	Pop 2010	Pop 2020	% 2010	% 2020
White alone (NH)	1	0	1.28%	0.00%
Black or African American alone (NH)	0	0	0.00%	0.00%
Native American or Alaska Native alone (NH)	0	0	0.00%	0.00%
Asian alone (NH)	0	0	0.00%	0.00%
Native Hawaiian or Pacific Islander alone (NH)	0	0	0.00%	0.00%
Other race alone (NH)	0	0	0.00%	0.00%
Mixed race or Multiracial (NH)	0	2	3.03%	0.00%
Hispanic or Latino (any race)	77	64	96.97%	100.00%
Total	78	66	100.00%	100.00%

== Education ==
The CDP is within the Rio Grande City Grulla Independent School District (formerly Rio Grande City Consolidated Independent School District)
