= Domingo Marcos Durán =

The Musical Wheel from Durán's Lux Bella 1492, p. 10

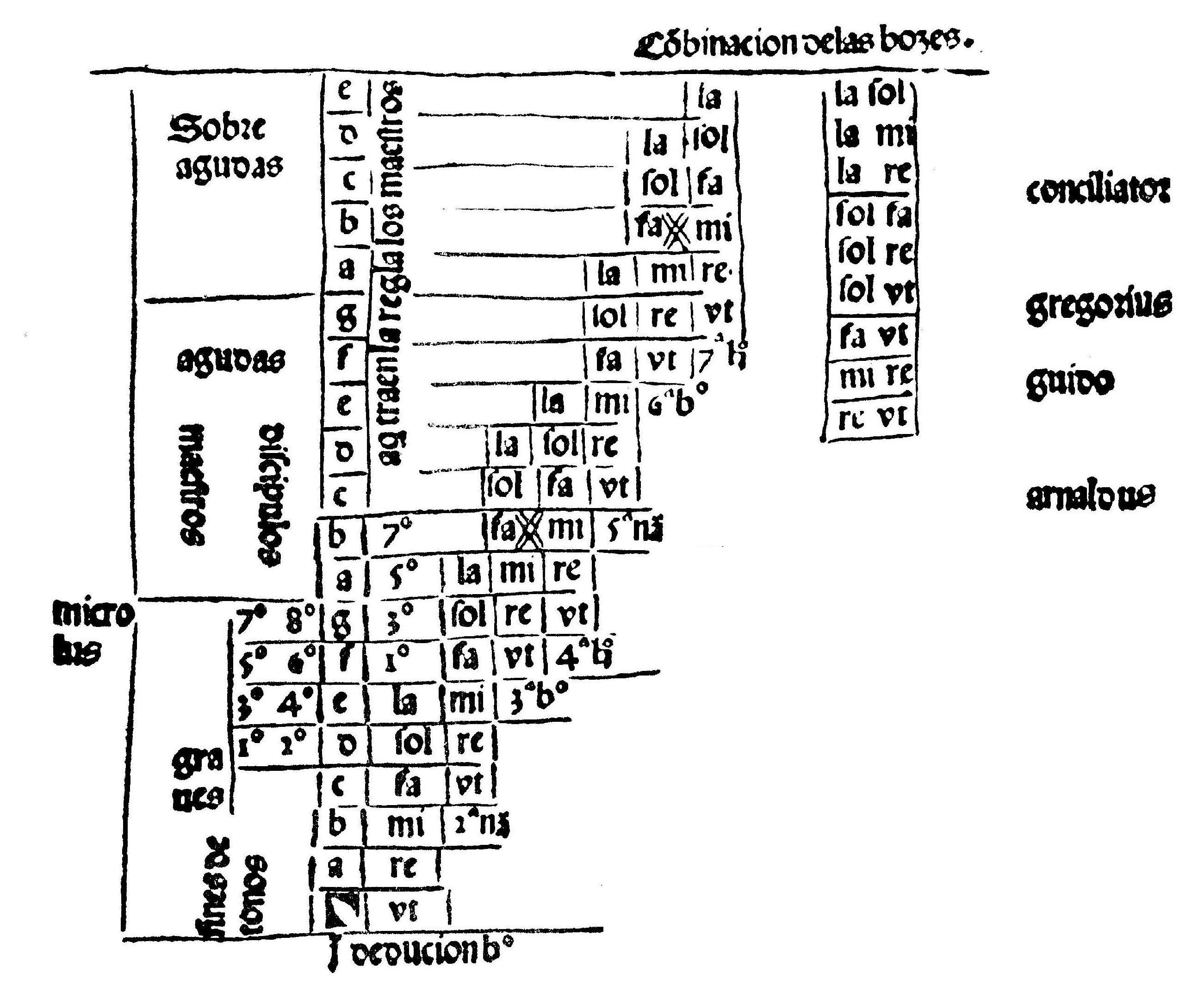
The Hexachords of Plainchant from Lux Bella 1492, p. 1

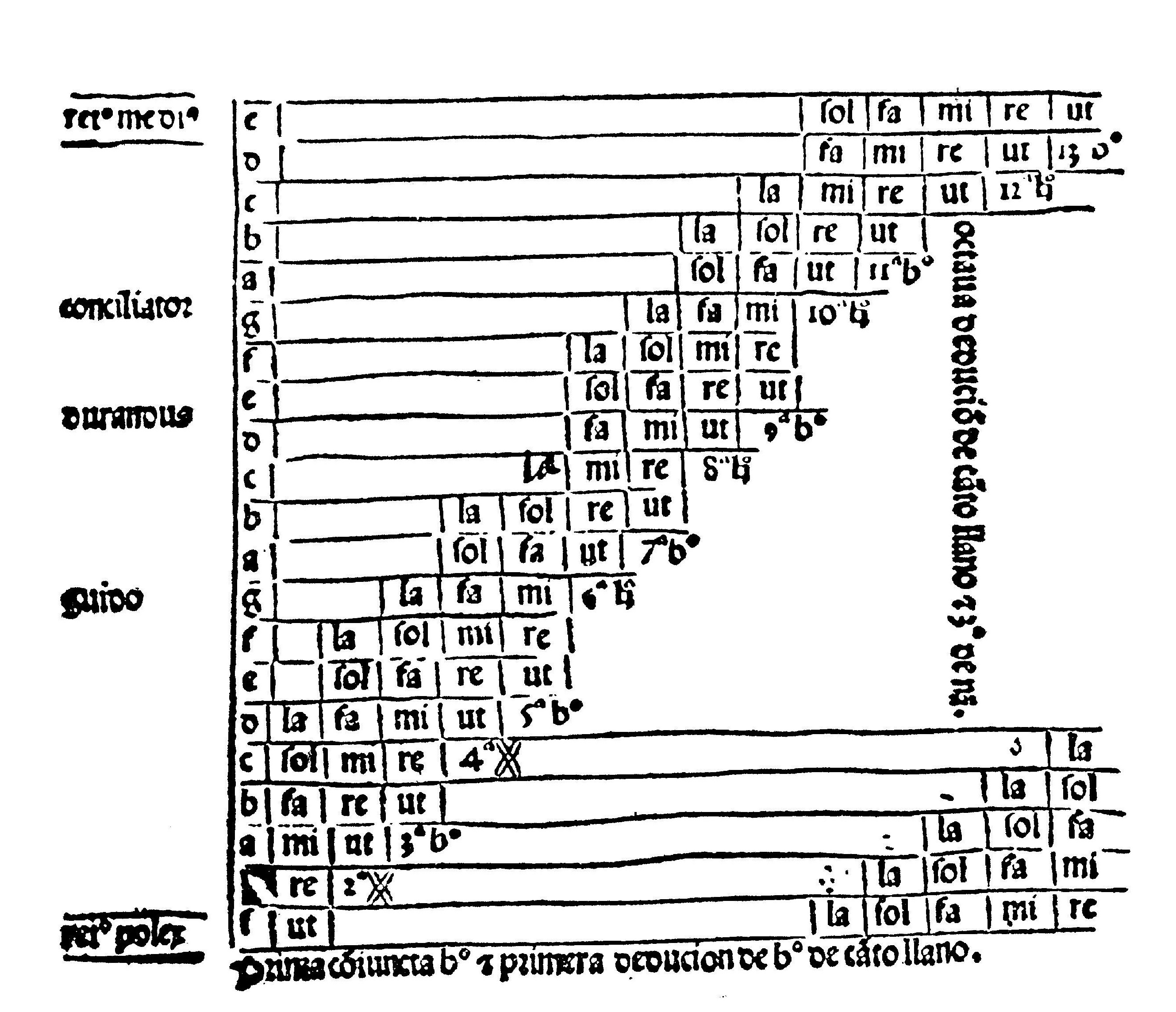
The Hexachords of Musica Ficta, from Lux Bella 1492, p. 8

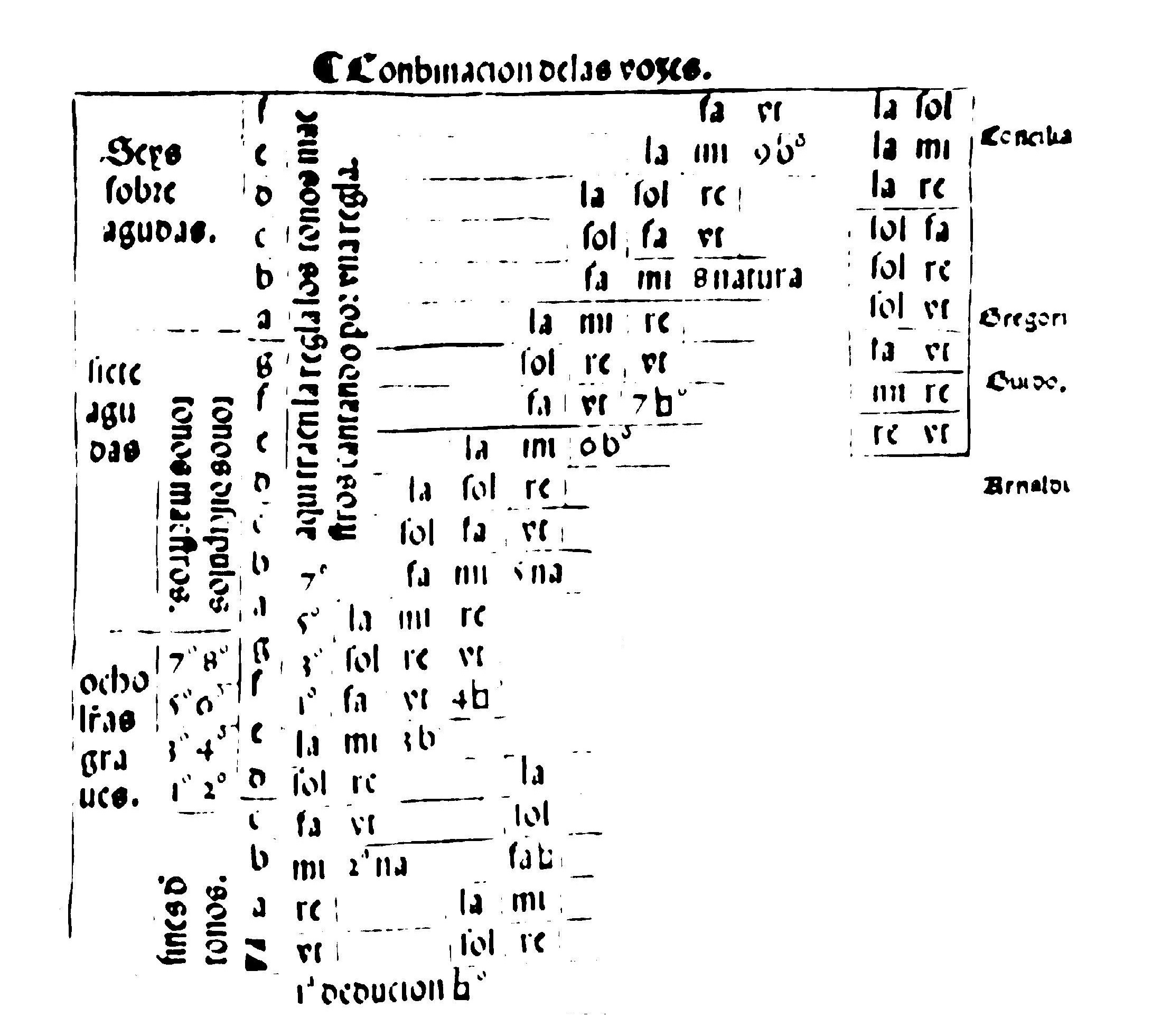
The Hexachords of Plainchant from Lux Bella 1506, p. 2

Domingo Marcos Durán (c. 1465 – 1529), was a Spanish music theorist and choirmaster. He was probably born in Garrovillas de Alconétar and died in Santiago de Compostela. His 1492 Lux Bella ("Beautiful Light") was the first treatise on music theory to be published in Castilian.

== Biography ==
Little is known about Durán's life except what is mentioned in his three extant works. In the introduction to Comento Sobre Lux Bella and Súmula de Canto de Organo, he said that he was the legitimate son of Juan Marcos and Isabel Fernandes who reside in Alconetar. Why he chose to be called Marcos Durán rather than the customary Marcos Fernandes is a mystery. He also said that he had earned the bachelor's degree from the University of Salamanca in Salamanca, having spent the better part of twenty-five years studying the liberal arts and philosophy. According to Taffal Abad, Durán spent his last years as choirmaster of the chapel in Santiago de Compostela and died shortly before September 5, 1529 when his successor was named.

== Contributions ==
Durán was the first theorist to publish a musical treatise in Castilian (Lux Bella, 1492), Durán's Súmula de Canto de Organo.(c. 1507) "ranks not only as the earliest Spanish-language treatise entirely devoted to polyphony, but also as the finest treatment published before Juan Bermudo's epochal Declaration de instruments (1555)." The emphasis in his writings is on practice and simplicity of presentation, rather than the mathematical ratios and explanations that figure prominently in many other theoretical writings.

In Lux Bella and Comento Sobre Lux Bella, he presented a discussion of the hexachordal system, including the hexachords of musica ficta, at its fullest extent—all six syllables clearly present on each scale degree. The accidentals that he allowed are F♯, C♯, B♭, E♭, and A♭.

Durán added two hexachords, and one letter, to the traditional Guidonian system, and then he overlapped the hexachords to extend the system indefinitely. In the Lux bella of 1492 Durán placed the added hexachords on c and f among the hexachords of musica ficta, but by the Comento of 1498 and the Lux Bella of 1509 he placed them among the traditional hexachords. This is can be seen graphically in three diagrams found in Lux Bella: two traditional vertical representations, one of plainchant and one of musica ficta, as well as a unique circular one. In the vertical diagrams, the pitch letters are on the left and the hexachords are depicted ascending. In the circular diagram, the pitch letters are in the outermost circle, and the hexachords are depicted spiraling inward counterclockwise beginning in the second inner circle.

In Lux Bella and Comento he presented rules for singing chants written in campo aperto on a single line. This was important since many choirbooks in Renaissance Spain at that time were old enough not to have the chant melodies written on four-line staves.

The three treatises of Durán constitute a complete musical education with a very practical approach.

== Published works ==
- Lux Bella, a very condensed discussion of plainchant.
  - First edition, Seville: quatro alemanes compañeros, 1492. (10 pages and tonary)
  - Second edition, Salamanca, 1509. (11 pages and tonary)
  - Third edition, Seville: Jacopo Cromberger, 1518. (11 pages and tonary)
- Comento Sobre Lux Bella, a line-by-line elaboration and commentary on Lux Bella
  - First edition, Salamanca, 1498. (74 pages)
- Súmula de Canto de Organo, a discussion of mensural notation and counterpoint. It contains an unattributed composition, "Cum Sancto Spirito," which is assumed to be a composition of Durán.
  - First edition, Salamanca, c. 1507. (45 pages)
