= Luís Marcelo Durán =

Uruguayan footballer (born 1974)

Marcelo Durán
Personal information
- Full name: Luis Marcelo Durán
- Date of birth: August 31, 1974 (age 52)
- Place of birth: Montevideo, Uruguay
- Height: 1.70 m (5 ft 7 in)
- Position: Forward

Senior career*
Years	Team	Apps	(Gls)
1996	Liverpool Montevideo		
1997–1998	El Tanque Sisley		
1999	Racing Montevideo		
2000	Huachipato	2	(0)
2001–2003	Central Español	36	(7)
2003	Melgar	18	(3)
2004	Cerro	17	(3)
2004	Central Español	9	(3)
2005	Fénix	7	(3)
2005	Deportes Arica	12	(1)
2006–2008	Cerro Largo	37	(14)
2007	→ Fernández Vial (loan)	16	(5)
2008–2009	Central Español	19	(3)
2009–2010	Juventud Las Piedras	21	(5)
- * Club domestic league appearances and goals

Luis Marcelo Durán (born August 31, 1974, in Montevideo, Uruguay), known as Marcelo Durán, is a former Uruguayan footballer who played for clubs of Uruguay, Chile and Peru.

== Teams ==
- (Uruguay) Liverpool 1996
- (Uruguay) El Tanque Sisley 1997–1998
- (Uruguay) Racing 1999
- (Chile) Huachipato 2000
- (Uruguay) Central Español 2001–2003
- (Peru) Melgar 2003
- (Uruguay) Cerro 2004
- (Uruguay) Fénix 2005
- (Chile) Deportes Arica 2005
- (Uruguay) Cerro Largo 2006–2007
- (Chile) Fernández Vial 2007
- (Uruguay) Cerro Largo 2008
- (Uruguay) Central Español 2008–2009
- (Uruguay) Juventud Las Piedras 2009–2010
