= José Manuel García (footballer) =

Spanish footballer

José Manuel Garcia
Personal information
- Full name: José Manuel García Herrero
- Date of birth: 4 April 1950
- Place of birth: Gijón, Spain
- Date of death: 30 November 2014 (aged 64)
- Place of death: Gijón, Spain
- Height: 1.65 m (5 ft 5 in)
- Position: Midfielder

Youth career
- Colegio Inmaculada
- Sporting Gijón

Senior career*
Years	Team	Apps	(Gls)
1967–1976	Sporting Gijón	136	(15)
1976–1978	Racing Santander	8	(0)
Total		142	(15)
- * Club domestic league appearances and goals

José Manuel García Herrero (4 April 1950 – 30 November 2014) was a Spanish professional footballer who played as a midfielder.

== Football career ==
Born in Gijón, Asturias, García played for Sporting de Gijón and Racing de Santander during an 11-year professional career. He made his debut for the former in 1968, excelling against marker Ferran Olivella in a 2–0 home win against FC Barcelona for the Copa del Generalísimo (2–5 aggregate loss).

With Sporting, García spent three years in La Liga, sharing teams with namesake Ángel Herrero and thus being known as Herrero II. He retired from racing in 1978 at age 28 due to an ulna injury.

== Death ==
Garcia died in his hometown on 30 November 2014, aged 64.

== Honours ==
Sporting Gijón

- Segunda División: 1969–70
