= Maria Duran =

Portuguese nun c. (1710 – ?)

Maria Duran (c. 1710 – ?), also known as Maria Christina de Escalhão e Pinos and Maria Durão, was a Portuguese nun accused of witchcraft and working with the devil to grow a penis to have sex with women.

Born in a Catalan village, she married a man at age 14 and they had a child together. She left her husband about seven years later, and she traveled to various locations throughout Iberia. When she was about 23, she began to wear men's clothes, and according to her testimony, she became a member of the Aragónese armed forces. Upon leaving the army, she joined various religious convents, including the Convent of Our Lady of Paradise in Évora. There, she had sex with women, was suspected of being intersex, and underwent physical examinations to determine her sex.

She was expelled from the convent after members claimed she had a penis, and she was arrested by the Portuguese Inquisition on 17 February 1741. In her trial, she was tortured, found guilty and expelled from the country. There is no evidence of her life after her sentence. She was one of few women in Portuguese history to be charged with homosexual conduct as a crime.

== Early life ==
According to her own testimony, Duran was born around 1710 in the Catalan village of Prullans to António Duran and Margarida Duran. She said she spent time in Barcelona and lived in Lisbon at various points to enter recolhimentos (shelters for girls and women). She married a man named Ignacio Sulsona at 14, and at 18, she had a child named Pedro with Sulsona, but he died in infancy. She left Sulsona at around age 21.

She testified that after she left her husband, she went to Sant Julià de Lòria in Andorra, and then left; after leaving Sant Julià de Lòria in around 1733, she began wearing male clothing. She said she had enrolled in the Aragonese army. She left the army and went to Portugal, and upon arrival, confessed that she was a woman in men's clothing; a priest said she should enter a convent, and she entered various convents in the country for short times. She left them, traveled to Lisbon, and began wearing male clothing again. She then went to Évora.

== Convent life ==
She was in the novitiate at the Convent of Our Lady of Paradise in Évora. Under suspicion of having ambiguous sex organs (in the terminology of the time, being a hermaphrodite), she was physically examined by a doctor and two religious figures, but they determined she appeared female. The religious figures decided against performing an exorcism on her, claiming that she was not inhabited by any malevolent spirit, but instead that she worked with the devil to grow a penis to have sex with women. Others in the community claimed to have seen her with a penis, and she was expelled from the convent.

== Inquisition trial ==
=== Pre-trial testimony ===
Various members of her community testified against her prior to her arrest.

First to testify was Josefa Maria Xavier of São Nicolão, who stated that Duran was born into an inferior social class, that others in the community suspected her of being a man, that Duran was to be kept away from young women in the convent, and that Duran showed her scratches on her arm from the devil. Second was Maria de Jesus, from Lisbon, who stated that Duran professed her love for her as though she were a man and attempted to have sex with her on more than one occasion (resulting in Duran's ejaculation), that Duran told her she had attempted to have sex with a woman named Verónica Maria, and that Duran threatened her to not tell anyone.

Maria de Jesus also testified that Duran had impregnated a woman named Agostinha, but Agostinha had a miscarriage. Third was Vitória da Rosa, from Rome, who stated that Duran professed her love for her, that Duran raped her with a penis several times, that Duran had both a penis and a vulva, and that Duran had told her to keep the rapes a secret. Vitória da Rosa also corroborated the testimony of Josefa Maria Xavier and Maria de Jesus: She had seen injuries on Duran's body from a demon, and she knew that Agostinha had been impregnated by Duran after their sexual relationship. Fourth was Verónica Maria, from the convent, who said Duran (using the name António and with a penis) had sex with her. Verónica Maria believed Duran was not involved in witchcraft, but was instead a hermaphrodite. The last witness was António Soares, the doctor who inspected Duran; he testified that she had the physical characteristics of a woman.

=== Arrest ===
Duran was arrested by the Portuguese Inquisition on 17 February 1741 for witchcraft. The details of her detention are not known, but prosecutors heard further testimony from others in the community about her sexual advances and anatomy.

She was interrogated on 13 March 1741. Around this time, they interrogated Agostinha—then a nun under the name Agostinha Teresa da Purificação—who testified that the two had sexual contact, but said she had never seen Duran with a penis. Nuns in Évora were sent a list of questions in April, and in the same month, several of them were interrogated. On 8 July, Duran was interrogated again, and she said she was a woman, did not have a penis, and did not have sex with any women. Almost two months later, she was interrogated again, and she denied having contact with the devil. She never confessed to working with the devil, though she admitted to sexually penetrating and engaging in tribadism with women.

=== Trial and sentence ===
Duran was indicted on 7 November 1741. She was charged with 13 crimes, including contact with the devil and having sex with women. The next day, she selected João Nunes da Silveira as her attorney, and they responded to the charges the next week. Some witnesses were re-interrogated, and on 19 May 1742, her charges were updated. The next month, physicians and a midwife physically examined Duran; they all testified that she appeared to have only female genitalia, and one physician testified that although some women have large clitorises that resemble penises, Duran's was small. She was placed in warm water by investigators in order to have her penis appear, but it did not.

In September, the inquisitors overseeing Duran's trial voted to torture her. The torture was postponed to 15 April 1744 to allow the inquisitors to deliberate on her guilt and seek outside legal guidance. In May, the inquisitors voted to have Duran denounce her heresy, leave Portugal, and have her verdict read in a private auto-da-fé (criminal procession). The General Council of the Inquisition overturned the vote, and sentenced her to a public auto-da-fé, a public flogging, and to leave Portugal.

Alongside 33 others on 21 June 1744, Duran experienced her auto-da-fé in the presence of King João V of Portugal. The last extant evidence of her life comes from after the auto-da-fé; in it, she is recorded as accepting her sentence of being expelled from Portugal.

== Legacy ==
Her trial documentation is archived by the Torre do Tombo National Archive in 367 folios. François Soyer, a scholar on Duran's life, writes that calling her a lesbian is inaccurate: the term lesbian was not used in mid-18th-century Portugal, and there is no evidence she had any specific sexual identity. Duran was one of very few women in Portugal charged with homosexual conduct as a crime. One of the only other cases is that of Branca Freire and Joana Fernandes, circa 1550; Freire was sentenced to expulsion from Portugal (on appeal, sentenced to only a fine) and Fernandes possibly burned to death. Soyer writes that Duran was not sentenced "because of her homosexuality"—the Portuguese Inquisition had decided a century earlier to no longer investigate female homosexuality unless it involved anal penetration—but instead for causing distress to others.

== See also ==
- Magdaleene and Mayken – two women tried for homosexuality in the Netherlands in 1618
