= Manuel García Velarde =

Spanish physicist and university teacher

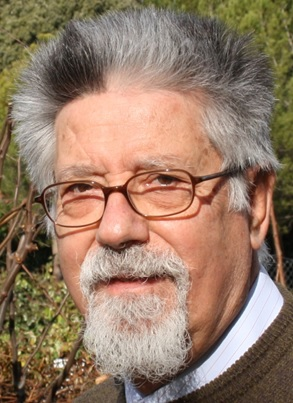
- Born: 14 September 1941 (age 84); Almería, Spain
- Occupations: physicist and university teacher
- Spouse: María del Pilar Ibarz Gil (m. 1965)
- Awards: See Awards

Manuel García Velarde (pronounced [maˈnwel ɣaɾˈθia βeˈlaɾðe]; born 14 September 1941) is a Spanish physicist and university professor, currently a member of the Academia Europaea, the Royal Academy of Doctors of Spain and the European Academy of Sciences. Velarde has worked in American and European universities and research organizations, focusing on fluid dynamics and other non-linear problems, including the kinetic and thermodynamic theories, hydrodynamic and interfacial instabilities, anharmonic lattices and electronics.

Because of his research achievements and international cooperation, he received the insignia of Officer of the National Order of Merit of France, belongs to the Ordre des Palmes Académiques, and holds the Blaise Pascal Medal and the Medal of the Royal Spanish Society of Physics.

== Life ==
Velarde was born in Almería, Spain, on 14 September 1941. In 1963 he graduated in physics at the Complutense University of Madrid and, thanks to a scholarship, started to work at the Junta de Energía Nuclear (JEN), precursor of the Centro de Investigaciones Energéticas, Medioambientales y Tecnológicas (CIEMAT).

In 1965 he left the JEN, married María del Pilar Ibarz Gil and decided to work for a PhD degree. Influenced by Ilya Prigogine, he ended up getting two PhD degrees, one in 1968 at the Complutense University of Madrid and another in 1970 at the Université Libre de Bruxelles, which allowed him to work both in the Spanish academic world and abroad. From 1969 to 1971 he worked at the University of Texas at Austin, where Prigogine led a research institute.

Back in Spain, in 1971 Velarde started to teach and research at the Autonomous University of Madrid, where he created the Department of Fluid Physics. In 1979 he started to work at the National University of Distance Education, where he created the Department of Physics, and in 1993 he returned to his alma mater, the Complutense University of Madrid, where he worked as a full professor and co-founded the Instituto Pluridisciplinar.

From 1995 to 1997 he was vice-president and, from 1997 to 1999, president of the European Low Gravity Research Association.

Throughout his career, García Velarde has held visiting or invited positions at the universities of Paris-Sud, Pierre and Marie Curie, London, Aix-Marseille, Grenoble, Huazhong, Sofia, Stanford, Cambridge, UC Berkeley, UC Santa Barbara, UC Irvine, Paris-Est Marne-la-Vallée, Libre de Bruxelles, Norwegian of Science and Technology and East China Normal, apart from institutions such as Los Alamos National Laboratory, the Saclay Nuclear Research Centre and the International Center for Mechanical Sciences, of which he was rector from 2002 to 2004.

== Awards ==
- 1991: Academia award of the Spanish Royal Academy of Sciences
- 1994: Doctor honoris causa of Aix-Marseille University
- 1994: Ordre des Palmes Académiques
- 1996: Médaille Rammal of the Société Française de Physique and the Fondation de l'École Normale Supérieure
- 2003: Premio DuPont de la Ciencia
- 2006: Medal of the Royal Spanish Society of Physics
- 2010: Doctor honoris causa of Saratov State University
- 2013: National Order of Merit of France
- 2015: Blaise Pascal Medal in Physics
- 2015: Doctor honoris causa of the University of Almería
