= Manuel García (footballer, born 1985) =

Chilean footballer

Personal information
- Full name: Manuel Alejandro García
- Date of birth: 25 April 1985 (age 41)
- Place of birth: Coquimbo, Chile
- Position: Midfielder

Senior career*
Years	Team	Apps	(Gls)
2003–2009	Coquimbo Unido	102	(5)
2010	Deportes Copiapó	10	(1)
2013	Lota Schwager	3	(0)
- * Club domestic league appearances and goals as of 28 July 2021

Manuel Alejandro García (born 25 April 1985) is a Chilean footballer who plays as a midfielder. He is currently a free agent.

== Career ==
García began his senior career in 2003 with Coquimbo Unido of the Chilean Primera División. He remained with the club for six years and made a total of one hundred and two appearances, whilst scoring five times including his first during the 2004 season against Deportes La Serena on 3 November. In 2010, García joined Primera B de Chile side Deportes Copiapó. One goal, versus San Marcos, in ten games followed. 2013 saw fellow Primera B team Lota Schwager sign García. However, he departed soon after following three appearances.
