= Carolyn Duran =

American materials scientist

Carolyn Renee Duran
- Education: Northwestern University; Carnegie Mellon University
- Employer: Apple Inc
- Organization: Materials Research Society

Carolyn Renee Duran is an American materials scientist who is Senior Director of Product Integrity at Apple Inc. She is the former President of the Materials Research Society, and was elected to the National Academy of Engineering in 2024.

== Early life and education ==
Duran studied materials science and engineering at Carnegie Mellon University. She moved to Northwestern University for her doctoral research, where she studied the structure-property relationships of superconducting thin films grown using metalorganic chemical vapor deposition.

== Career ==
Duran joined Intel, where she eventually served as Vice President of Technology Development. She focussed on programs to continue advancing Moore's law. Duran spent 24 years at Intel, where she developed processing techniques for thin films and a program on responsible mineral sourcing. She created new strategies to create interconnects.

In 2010, Duran was responsible for Supply Chains at Intel, where she was part of the Conflict Free Minerals Team. She found that the semiconducting chips that Intel were creating used materials that had been mined from the Democratic Republic of the Congo. She led an effort to eliminate conflict materials from the supply chain, identifying audited, legitimate mines that were not involved with armed rebel militia. In 2016, Intel announced that every product it shipped would be conflict-free. She argued that avoiding DRC mining would hurt their already struggling population, but identifying conflict-free mines was a challenge. Duran found that the smelters – the raw ore refiners – were the vulnerable point in the supply chain, and led the development of the Conflict Free Smelter Program. She spent five years visiting smelters and attempting to convince them to be audited. Her efforts meant that by 2016, 90% of the world's tantalum was conflict-free.

In 2023, Duran was appointed Senior Director of Product Integrity at Apple.

== Awards and honors ==
- 2014 Business Insider Most Powerful Women Engineers in the World
- 2016 Fast Company Most Creative People in Business 1000
- 2022 Elected President of the Materials Research Society
- 2024 Elected Fellow of the National Academy of Engineering
