= Manuel García Corpus =

Mexican politician

- Born: 6 February 1958 (age 68); Zaachila, Oaxaca, Mexico
- Education: Chapingo Autonomous University; UABJO
- Occupation: Politician
- Political party: PRI

Teófilo Manuel García Corpus (born 6 February 1958) is a Mexican politician affiliated with the Institutional Revolutionary Party (PRI).

He was elected to the Chamber of Deputies to represent the ninth district of Oaxaca on three occasions: in the 1997 mid-terms, in the 2003 mid-terms and in the 2009 mid-terms.

In 2001–2003 he served as a local deputy in the 58th session of the Congress of Oaxaca.
