= Manuel García (footballer, born 1980) =

Argentine footballer

Personal information
- Full name: Manuel Pablo García
- Date of birth: 11 November 1980 (age 45)
- Place of birth: Brinkmann, Argentina
- Height: 1.79 m (5 ft 10 in)
- Position: Forward

Youth career
- –2000: Racing Club de Avellaneda

Senior career*
Years	Team	Apps	(Gls)
2000–2004	Racing Club de Avellaneda	13	(2)
2003–2004	→ Legia Warsaw (loan)	12	(0)
2004–2006	Unión de Sunchales	72	(31)
2006	Atlético Tucumán	9	(2)
2006	ASD Riccione 1929	7	(1)
2007	San Martín de San Juan	14	(1)
2008	Matera Calcio	6	(0)
2008–2009	Campobasso Calcio	3	(0)
2009–2011	Unión de Sunchales	40	(8)
2012	CB Ramón Santamarina	2	(0)
- * Club domestic league appearances and goals

Manuel Pablo García (born 11 November 1980) is an Argentine former professional footballer who played primarily as forward.

== Club career ==
García started his career in the youth team of Racing Club de Avellaneda, and made his professional Argentine Primera División debut in 2000. In the summer of 2003 he was loaned to Ekstraklasa side Legia Warsaw. He made his league debut in a 0–0 draw against Górnik Łęczna on 16 August 2003. Playing for the club in the 2003–04 season, García made 12 league appearances without any goal scored. Since 2004 he has represented numerous clubs in lower leagues of Argentine and Italy, retiring from football in 2012 after a short spell at CB Ramón Santamarina.
