= Mario Rafael Méndez Martínez =

Mexican politician

- Born: 31 May 1957 (age 68); Oaxaca, Mexico
- Occupation: Deputy
- Political party: PRD

Mario Rafael Méndez Martínez (born 31 May 1957) is a Mexican politician affiliated with the Party of the Democratic Revolution (PRD). In the 2012 general election he was elected to the Chamber of Deputies to represent the ninth district of Oaxaca during the 62nd Congress.
