= Andrés Durán =

Colombian historian

Andrés Durán Ángel
- Born: February 20, 1966 (age 60); Bogotá, Colombia
- Presenting career
- Show: "Rock and Roll Radio", "Top 25 Metal Detector", "Bluesonica", "Dias de Radio", "Expreso Radionica", "Metal Detector", "El Hall de la Fama", "Desayuno con los Beatles", "Clásicos Radiónica"
- Station: Radiónica www.radionica.rocks
- Network: Radio Televisión Nacional de Colombia
- Style: Rock
- Country: Colombia
- Website: http://www.elexpresodelrock.com/

Andrés Durán (born February 20, 1966) is a Colombian rock historian, a radio broadcaster and producer of Blues, Writer of Book "Rockestra", Rock and Metal programs at Radiónica Station in Bogotá Colombia. He also is the creator and producer of the on-line radio station "El Expreso del Rock".

== Current work ==
Durán has been working for Radio Televisión Nacional de Colombia since 2005 as producer of the programs "Expreso Radionica","Detector", "Metal Detector", "El Hall de la Fama", "Desayuno con los Beatles" and "Clásicos Radiónica". He has also been giving rock conferences for Fondo de Cultura Económica since 2009.

== Former work ==
He has been presenter and jury for Rock Festivals such as Rock al Parque as well as a lecturer of rock conferences at different universities, schools and libraries in Bogotá - Colombia. He worked for “Radiodifusora Nacional de Colombia”, as the broadcaster and producer of the programs “Blues 99.1”, “Carouselambra” “Detector” and “Mundo Zappa”. Since 1989 to 2001, he also hosted a weekly Sunday four-hour program “El Expreso del Rock” on 88.9 fm, “Superestación”. Durán also produced and broadcast the program “Black Night” on Dyna Radio on-line. He has also been a freelance translator for musical tours and for specialized rock magazines from English into Spanish and has been columnist for Colombian local rock magazines such as Music Machine, Concierto, Acme, Shock, Mtres.com y la Rosca.

== Biography ==
Andrés Durán Angel was born the 21st of February, 1966 in Bogotá, Colombia. Since he was a child he got so interested in all rock and roll genres, that he started his own music collection. He attended to Santo Tomas de Aquino High School and immediately he travelled to Los Angeles in order to improve his English, to get familiarized with the rock scene and to study broadcasting and radio production at Trebas Institute in Hollywood. Then he came back and created his own record label, Talisman Music, where many local bands in Bogota such as Neurosis, La Pestilencia, Agony, Kilcrops and Aldea started their music careers. After that, he began to work as radio broadcaster and producer.
