= Jose Duran (designer) =

José Durán (born Moca, Dominican Republic) is a Dominican fashion designer based in New York, New York.
