= Garcí Manuel de Carbajal =

Don Garcí Manuel de Carbajal (died 1552) was a Spanish lieutenant and occasional soldier who founded the city of Arequipa in Peru on 15 August 1540, calling it "La Villa Hermosa de Arequipa." Carbajal was born in Plasencia, Extremadura, Spain and explored present-day Arequipa as an emissary of Spanish conquistador Francisco Pizarro.

Soon after the capture and execution of Atahualpa and the conquest of the Inca Empire was assured, Francisco Pizarro sent numerous Spanish delegations across Peru to discover new cities to consolidate his newly acquired dominions. Such was the case behind the exploration of what would become the city of Arequipa: the Spanish delegation led by Carbajal followed the advice of Pizarro and journeyed to Southern Peru. During the exploration, Carbajal and his followers reached the coast of Camaná and settled there briefly. To their dismay, however, many started suffering from fever and other illnesses and soon decided they needed a healthier, more hospitable place for their habitation.

As a result, the conquistadors decided to move inland and soon reached the current site of Arequipa's Plaza de Armas cathedral, planting a cross in the empty territory as a sign and custom for the construction of a new cathedral. Other local historians suggest Carbajal decided to make this the main plaza as it afforded a great background view of a majestic volcano in the background. Carbajal also began establishing the grid of streets as drawn up by the orders of Pizarro.

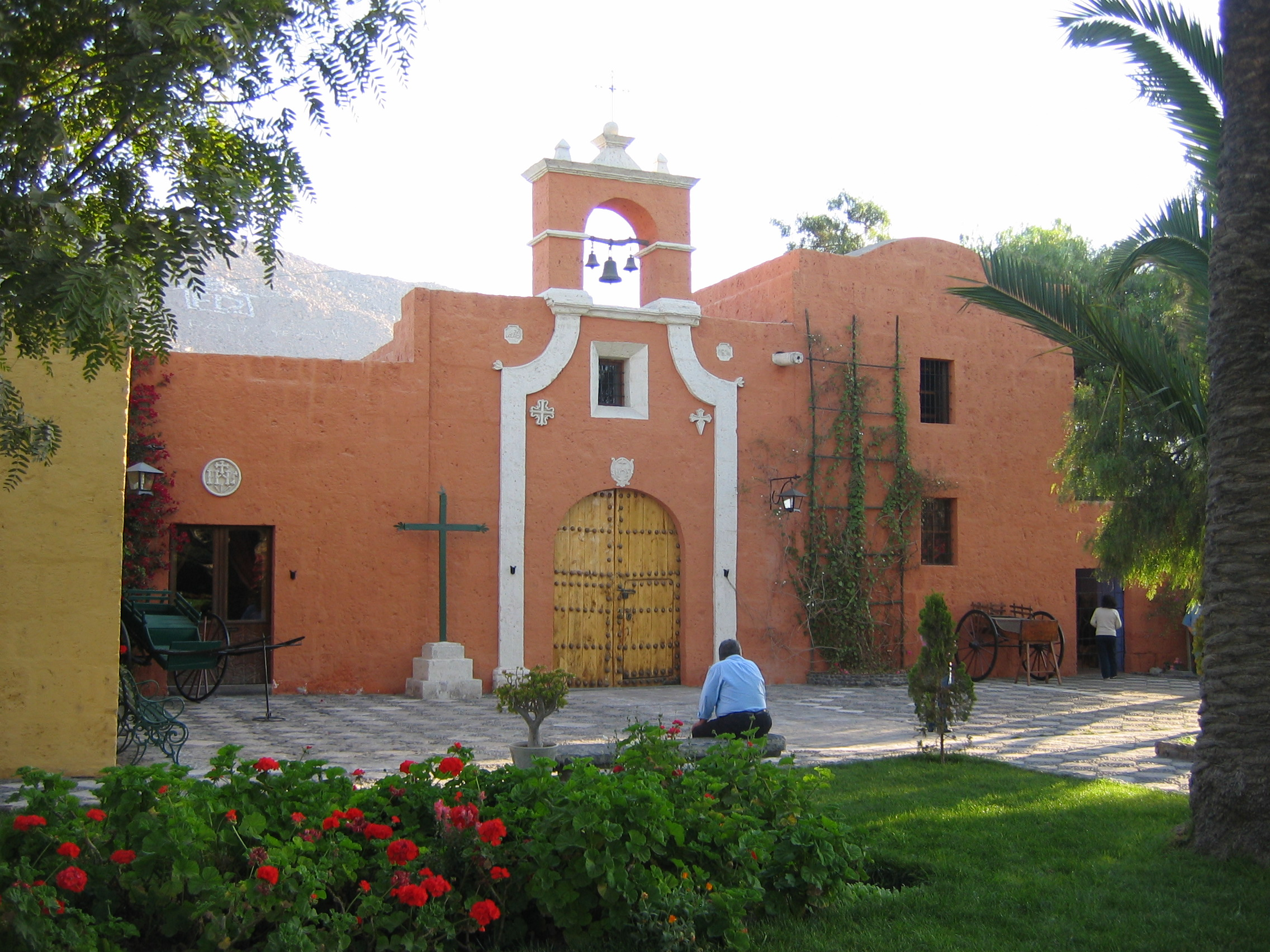
View of Carbajal's restored house mansion

Many of the other early developments of the city were done under the direct guidance of Carbajal and in consultation with Pizarro and his followers. Some accounts say Pizarro himself was in Arequipa in 1539 with the intention of participating in the city's foundation, but had to leave immediately upon being called to attend peace negotiations with Manco Inca in Yucay (30 km away from Machu Picchu). Of the developments in Arequipa after these years little is known. Carbajal, meanwhile, decided to build his permanent living quarters in what would later be called "La Mansión del Fundador," located on the bank of the Socabaya River in the small countryside town of Huasacache (10 km from the Plaza de Armas).

Throughout the centuries the house deteriorated but was again restored in the early 1980s and is now frequently visited by tourists despite having changed owners many times. After Carbajal's death in 1552, his burial site remained unknown; however, according to local legends his remains were interred at a supposed subterranean pathway under Arequipa's Plaza de Armas cathedral, like Francisco Pizarro's body in Lima.

== See also ==
- Spanish conquest of Peru
