= Manuel García (Puerto Rican artist) =

Puerto Rican painter (1670–1700)

Manuel García (1670–1700) was a Puerto Rican painter.
