= José Antonio Durán =

Argentine military man and politician

Coronel José Antonio Durán

Acting Governor of San Juan Province
- In office 1854–1854
- President: Justo José de Urquiza
- Preceded by: Nazario Benavídez
- Succeeded by: Nazario Benavídez

Minister of San Juan Province
- In office 1852–1857
- Preceded by: ?
- Succeeded by: ?

Personal details
- Born: José Antonio Jesús Durán y Ortiz; 1810 San Juan, Viceroyslty of the Rio de la Plata
- Died: c. 1880 Buenos Aires, Argentina
- Resting place: Recoleta Cemetery
- Party: Federal
- Spouse(s): Gregoria Pereira; Dolores Cabrera; Francisca Arredondo
- Occupation: military politician
- Profession: army
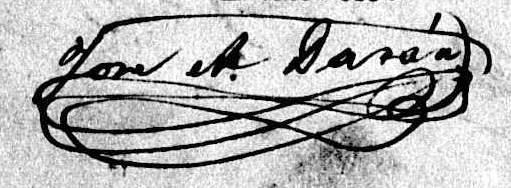
- Signature

Military service
- Allegiance: Argentine Confederation - until 1861; Argentine Republic
- Branch/service: Argentine Army
- Years of service: 1830-1870s
- Rank: Colonel
- Battles/wars: Battle of Angaco; Batalla de La Chacarilla; Batalla de Iliaca; Battle of Cepeda; Battle of Pavón

José Antonio Durán (1810 - c.1880) was an Argentine military man and politician, who participated in the main military actions that occurred during the Argentine Civil War. He served as secretary of the Government of Nazario Benavídez, and as war correspondent of Juan Manuel de Rosas in San Juan Province.

== Biography ==
He was born in San Juan Province, Argentina, the son of Juan Durán and Javiera Ortiz, belonging to a traditional Creole family. He had an active participation in Argentine civil conflicts, serving under the General Benavides in the military campaigns of 1841, 1842 and 1843, against Unitarian troops. He also taking part in the Battle of Angaco.

He served the army of the Argentine Confederation during the Battle of Cepeda and Pavón, to be later incorporated into the ranks of the Argentine Republic. He maintained an intense political activity in his native province, holding public positions alongside distinguished politicians of the city as Guillermo Rawson and Saturnino Manuel de Laspiur.

== Family ==
His paternal family was related to Camilo Rojo, governor of San Juan in 1864. He was married three times, first to Gregoria Pereira, secondly to Dolores Cabrera, daughter of Blas Cabrera and Mercedes Etchegaray, and third with Francisca Arredondo, daughter of Eugenio Arredondo and Rita Montemayor, belonging to a family from Entre Ríos and Santa Fe Province. He had several children, including Blas Antonio Durán Cabrera, godson of Nazario Benavidez, and Magdalena Durán Pereira, a lady related to the Quiroga family.

On July 19, 1866 he attended in the Parish Nuestra Señora de Montserrat like godfather of Alejo Camilo Canavery, son of Quintina Páez and Sinforoso Camilo Canavery, a former military man, who served in the Federal Army.
