= José María Pasquini Durán =

José María Pasquini Durán (1939 – 13 February 2010) was an Argentine journalist, writer, teacher and political analyst. He was one of the main writers of the newspaper Página 12 that he helped to found.

== Biography ==
He was born in 1939 in Salta. He died on 13 February 2010 of cardiac arrest in the Buenos Aires clinic Trinidad, where he was interned since two days before.

== Trajectory ==
In 1960, he started to work as freelance editor in union newspapers, one of them were the "CGT de los Argentinos" of Raimundo Ongaro, in which redaction was mate of Rodolfo Walsh. He was prosecretary of the redaction of Revista Panorama. He was also secretary of the redaction of the Colombian newspaper La Opinión, of Jacobo Timerman, El Periodista and Página 12, where he was politic editorialist since its foundation in 1987. During the last military dictatorship he was Latin American director of the IPS agency from Rome.

== Radio ==
He directed and led news programs in TV and radio. In the 1980s, with the recovery of the democracy, LR3 Radio Belgrano put in the air renovator programs like "Stories in Study".

== TV ==
He was supplier of the TV channels intervention. Carlos Ulanovsky remembers:

"The 1974 September 13, they don't let enter Mirtha Legrand to Canal 13 and they notify her that her program was prohibited (...) The coordanator, Alicia Norton, learns by Pasquini Durán that the program is over."

Pasquini Durán was a creative part of the miniserie Men in Conflict a rarity by Canal 7 Argentina commissioned by a sector of military hoping to show that in those hard times as Juan Manuel de Rosas with battles between units and federals, could also have agreements:

Together with José María Pasquini Durán and Roberto Cossa (an Argentinian director who had been blacklisted by the dictatorship), the screenwriters had to overcome a major challenge: delivering content that addressed the state-requested subject matter, while employing all possible strategies to ensure the censorship would miss what the viewer's eye would catch. The writers worked hard to determine how much of a story they could tell without the dictatorship intervening to alter the scripts.

== Academic ==
He made academic activities in the National University of La Plata and in the University of Buenos Aires. He gave conferences and participated in seminars in Argentina and abroad, during the latest thirty years. He worked in Bolivia, Colombia, Costa Rica, Cuba, Ecuador, Guyana, Italia, Mexico, Nicaragua, Panama, Peru and Venezuela.

== Consultancies ==
He was consultant of:

- UNESCO
- Latin American Economic System
- Andean Community of Nations
- United Nations Population Fund
- World Association for Christian Communication
- Latin American Council of Churches
