= Manuel Garcia-Duran =

Spanish businessman

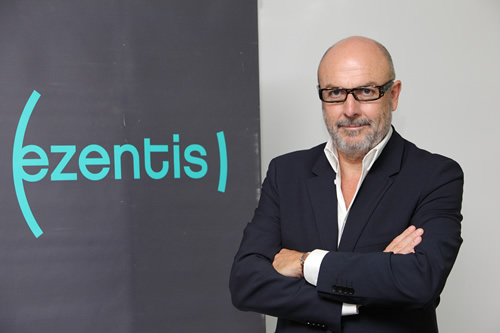
- Education: University of Deusto
- Occupations: Chief Executive Officer, Chairman of the Board of Directors
- Employer(s): Ezentis, Brasilinvest

Manuel García-Durán was the chairman and CEO of Grupo Ezentis (formerly Avánzit), a business group with more than 50 years of experience in the technology, infrastructure and telecommunications sectors, listed on the Madrid stock exchanges.

== Biography ==
=== Early life and education ===
García-Durán holds degrees in law and economics from the University of Deusto in Spain. He also studied French civilization at the Sorbonne, strategic marketing at the London Business School and attended the International Institute for Management Development in Lausanne, Switzerland.

=== Career ===
García-Durán’s professional career has been intrinsically linked to projects and companies in the technology, telecommunications and audiovisual sector. García-Durán was the chairman of Telefónica Media, the Spanish company’s business unit dedicated to the Group’s interests in audiovisual and media. He also held the position as General Manager of Marketing, Communications and Institutional Relations of Telefónica Group, at the time when the company was being privatized and began its internationalization process in 1996-2011. Additionally, García-Durán was the executive vice president of Antena3 TV, where he has led various projects related to the audiovisual sector in recent years.

On 14 September 2011 García-Durán was appointed as new chairman and CEO of Ezentis Group, (formerly Avánzit) a business group listed on the Madrid and Bilbao stock exchanges. It has over 50 years’ experience in the technology, infrastructure and telecommunications sectors, with over 5000 employees across 3 continents.

He has appointed advisor of the board of Brasilinvest that it is an important group with partners in 16 countries and prominent representatives from all around the world who are part of the group's board of advisors.

On 10 Genuary 2012 García-Duran was appointed as new chairman and CEO of Vertice 360, a business group listed on the Madrid, Barcelona, and Bilbao stock exchanges. He resigned in 2013.

In 2015 he was summarily dismissed from his post in Ezentis.
